= Lieutenant Governor of Hong Kong =

- Residence: Headquarter House
- Appointer: Monarch of the United Kingdom
- Formation: 1843
- First holder: George Charles D'Aguilar
- Final holder: Sir William Gascoigne
- Abolished: 1902

Lieutenant Governor of Hong Kong
- Traditional Chinese: 香港副總督
Transcriptions
Yue: Cantonese
- Yale Romanization: Hēung góng fu júng dūk
- Jyutping: Hoeng1 gong2 fu3 zung2 duk1

The Lieutenant Governor of Hong Kong held the second-highest position during the British colonial rule in Hong Kong from 1843 to 1902.

== History ==
Although Lieutenant Governor of Hong Kong was the second-highest position in Hong Kong, the Lieutenant Governor did not have any actual power in the Government – that power usually was gained by the Colonial Secretary. The first Lieutenant Governor of Hong Kong was George D'Aguilar and the post was subsequently held by the Commander British Forces in Hong Kong, thus all were British Army officers.

From the 1870s to 1902, the role lapsed from formal use and the second in command was transferred to the Colonial Secretary of Hong Kong (Chief Secretary after 1976). They may (or may not) have retained the title for special occasions.

== List of lieutenant governors ==
No.	Portrait	Name	Term of Office		Governor	Ref
No.	Portrait	Name	From	To	Governor	Ref
		George D'Aguilar 德忌笠; Major General	1843	1848	Sir Henry Pottinger (1843–1844)	
		George D'Aguilar 德忌笠; Major General	1843	1848	Sir John Francis Davis (1843–1848)	
		William Staveley 士他花利; Major General	1848	1851	Sir George Bonham (1848–1854)	
		William Jervois 乍畏; Major General	1851	1854	Sir George Bonham (1848–1854)	
		Sir Robert Garrett; Major General	1854	1857	Sir John Bowring (1854–1859)	
		Thomas Ashburnham; Major General	1857	1858	Sir John Bowring (1854–1859)	
		Sir Charles van Straubenzee; Major General	1858	1859	Sir John Bowring (1854–1859)	
		Sir Charles van Straubenzee; Major General	1858	1859	Sir Hercules Robinson (1859–1865)	
		Sir James Grant; Major General	1860	1861	Sir Hercules Robinson (1859–1865)	
		Sir John Michel; Major General	1861	1862	Sir Hercules Robinson (1859–1865)	
		Sir Charles Staveley; Major General	1862	1863	Sir Hercules Robinson (1859–1865)	
		William Brown; Major General	1863	1864	Sir Hercules Robinson (1859–1865)	
		Sir Philip Guy; Major General	1864	1867	Sir Hercules Robinson (1859–1865)	
		Sir Philip Guy; Major General	1864	1867	Sir Richard MacDonnell (1866–1872)	
		James Brunker; Major General	1867	1869	Sir Richard MacDonnell (1866–1872)	
		Henry Whitfield 威非路; Major General	1869	1874	Sir Richard MacDonnell (1866–1872)	
		Henry Whitfield 威非路; Major General	1869	1874	Sir Arthur Kennedy (1872–1877)	
		Sir Francis Colborne; Lieutenant General	1874	1878	Sir Arthur Kennedy (1872–1877)	
		Sir Francis Colborne; Lieutenant General	1874	1878	Sir John Pope Hennessy (1877–1882)	
		Edward Donovan Lieutenant General	1878	1882	Sir John Pope Hennessy (1877–1882)	
		John Sargent; Lieutenant General	1882	1885	Sir John Pope Hennessy (1877–1882)	
		John Sargent; Lieutenant General	1882	1885	Sir George Bowen (1883–1887)	
		Sir William Cameron 金馬倫; Lieutenant General	1885	1889	Sir George Bowen (1883–1887)	
		Sir William Cameron 金馬倫; Lieutenant General	1885	1889	Sir William Des Voeux (1887–1891)	
		Sir James Edwards; Major General	1889	1890	Sir William Des Voeux (1887–1891)	
		Sir George Barker 白加; Major General	1890	1895	Sir William Des Voeux (1887–1891)	
		Sir George Barker 白加; Major General	1890	1895	Sir William Robinson (1891–1898)	
		Sir Wilsone Black 布力; Major General	1895	1898	Sir William Robinson (1891–1898)	
		Sir William Gascoigne 加士居; Major General	1898	1902	Sir William Robinson (1891–1898)	
		Sir William Gascoigne 加士居; Major General	1898	1902	Sir Wilsone Black (1898)	
		Sir William Gascoigne 加士居; Major General	1898	1902	Sir Henry Arthur Blake (1898–1903)	

== Residence ==
The Lieutenant Governor as Commander of British Forces resided at Flagstaff House, then known as Headquarter House, from 1844 to 1902.

== See also ==
- Governor of Hong Kong
