= Richard Graves MacDonnell =

British colonial governor and lawyer

Sir Richard Graves MacDonnell KCMG CB
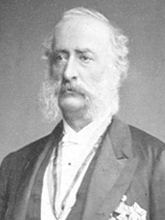

6th Governor of Hong Kong
- In office 11 March 1866 – 16 April 1872
- Monarch: Victoria
- Lieutenant: Sir Philip Guy; James Brunker; Henry Whitfield
- Colonial Secretary: John Gardiner Austin
- Preceded by: Sir Hercules Robinson
- Succeeded by: Sir Arthur Kennedy

31st Lieutenant Governor of Nova Scotia
- In office 24 May 1864 – October 1865
- Monarch: Victoria
- Preceded by: Sir Charles Hastings Doyle
- Succeeded by: General Sir William Williams

6th Governor of South Australia
- In office 8 June 1855 – 4 March 1862
- Monarch: Victoria
- Premier: Boyle Travers Finniss; John Baker; Robert Torrens; Richard Hanson; Thomas Reynolds; George Waterhouse
- Preceded by: Sir Henry Fox Young
- Succeeded by: Sir Dominic Daly

Personal details
- Born: 3 September 1814 Dublin, Ireland
- Died: 5 February 1881 (aged 66) Hyères, France
- Resting place: Kensal Green Cemetery, London, England
- Spouse: Blanche Ann Skurray (m. 1847)
- Education: Trinity College Dublin (BA, MA, LLB, LLD)

Chinese name
- Traditional Chinese: 麥當奴
- Simplified Chinese: 麦当奴
Transcriptions
Yue: Cantonese
- Yale Romanization: Maahk dōng nòuh
- Jyutping: Maak^{6} dong^{1} nou^{4}

Sir Richard Graves MacDonnell KCMG CB (Chinese: 麥當奴; 3 September 1814 – 5 February 1881) was an Anglo-Irish lawyer, judge and colonial governor. His posts as governor included Governor of the British Settlements in West Africa, Governor of Saint Vincent, Governor of South Australia, Governor of Nova Scotia and Governor of Hong Kong. Several places around the world are named for him, including MacDonnell Road in Hong Kong and the MacDonnell Ranges and Sir Richard Peninsula in Australia.

== Early life ==
Richard Graves MacDonnell was born in Dublin, 8 September 1814, the second son of Richard MacDonnell, the provost of Trinity College, Dublin, and Jane Graves (1793–1882), second daughter of Richard Graves, Dean of Ardagh. He was a nephew of Robert James Graves and the brother of Major-General Arthur Robert MacDonnell. His first cousins included Lady Valentine Blake of Menlough, Sir William Collis Meredith, Edmund Allen Meredith, John Dawson Mayne and Francis Brinkley. MacDonnell entered Trinity College Dublin in 1830, was elected a scholar in 1833, and graduated B.A. (1835), M.A., (1836), LL.B., (1845), and LL.D.., (1862)

== Governor in Gambia and the West Indies ==
MacDonnell was called to the Irish bar in 1838, and to the English bar, at Lincoln's Inn, 25 January 1841. On 20 July 1843, he was appointed to the new post of Chief Justice of the Gambia. After four years there, amidst long breaks for his health travelling through the United States and Canada, he intended to hand in his resignation to Henry Grey, 3rd Earl Grey, and resume practice at the English bar. But, on 1 October 1847, Grey persuaded him otherwise and appointed him Governor of the British settlements in Gambia, a post he held for a further four years.

While in Gambia, MacDonnell (a cousin of the explorers Captain Sir Richard Francis Burton and Admiral Richard Charles Mayne) spent much of his time indulging his passion for exploration, and organising punitive campaigns against unruly native tribes. His expeditions opened up the interior of Africa from the Gambia River to the Senegal River. The military expeditions which he accompanied against native tribes who had long oppressed the traders of the river were a success and extended the limits of British commerce in the region. On one visit to a native king an ambush was laid for him, and he narrowly avoided being assassinated. In return, the British government sent four hundred men to inflict a summary chastisement, with MacDonnell acting as Captain of one of the volunteer companies.

In 1852, (when he was also gazetted Companion of the Order of the Bath) he was nominated as Lieutenant Governor of St. Lucia, but without taking up the post he was sent, 10 January 1853, to become administrator and Captain General of the island of St. Vincent. He was Lieutenant General of St Vincent from 1853 to 1854.

== Governor of South Australia ==
Described as a 'dominant personality' and having gained a reputation for forthrightness and intolerance, MacDonnell was appointed the sixth Governor of South Australia, arriving 9 June 1855, taking over from Boyle Travers Finniss who had been acting since the departure of Sir Henry Young. Shortly before leaving for Australia, in 1856 he was made Knight Commander of the Order of St Michael and St George by Queen Victoria at Buckingham Palace.

Soon after his arrival in Australia, MacDonnell was involved in heated debate over the composition of the legislature; MacDonnell favoured a single chamber while the majority of colonists preferred a two-house system, which brought him the support of the conservatives, but united the liberals and radicals against him. Eventually a two-house system prevailed, although the Upper House had a property franchise. Difficulties between MacDonnell and his officials led to several changes of government. He extended railway and telegraph communications within the colony and opened up valuable copper mines on the Yorke Peninsula, while increasing the progress in agricultural and pastoral pursuits.

MacDonnell showed little concern for the Australian working class, holding that charity fostered sloth and pauperism. He was particularly impressed with the settlers from Germany, and he predicted that the colony had a great future for producing wine. In his seven-year term the acreage under wheat doubled in South Australia and he argued that farmers with capital would succeed as long as their methods did not rob the soil.

MacDonnell's passion for exploration greatly aided in opening up the interior of Australia, in particular the Murray River, and he developed many of the natural resources of the colony. He travelled widely in the colony and in 1859 led a small party to investigate country around the northern lakes and claypans, riding 1,800 miles (2,900 km) in three months. He maintained that Charles Sturt and Edward John Eyre were overrated as explorers as they seemed "generally to have a knack of getting into the most dismal places and finding barrenness from Dan to Beersheba". He instead urged the colonists to support the efforts of John McDouall Stuart to cross the continent.

MacDonnell was regarded in Australia as both 'powerful and hospitable'. He was an enthusiastic member of local rifle and archery clubs and keenly interested in the volunteer defence movement. He also identified himself with most of the literary, artistic and philanthropic organizations. He saw himself as a leader and innovator, and though genial, at times his bustling energy dismayed Adelaide society. As a patron of South Australian culture he encouraged students who could not travel abroad to continue their post-primary schooling, and with his customary dash personally examined candidates and donated prizes, but his plan collapsed after he left the colony. He left South Australia, 4 March 1862, for a holiday in Ireland before taking up his next post.

== Governor of Nova Scotia ==
On the recommendation of his predecessor, George Phipps, 2nd Marquess of Normanby, MacDonnell was appointed Governor of Nova Scotia from 28 May 1864, until October 1865, taking up residence at Government House (Nova Scotia). His arrival coincided with the Confederation of Canada which he made no secret of being in opposition to, and he refused to become a tool of either the British Colonial Secretary or the Governor General of Canada, telling Prime Minister Sir John A. Macdonald, "You shall not make a mayor of me, I can tell you!" Confederation went ahead, making MacDonnell's tenure in Nova Scotia a short one. He was succeeded by one of Nova Scotia's most distinguished sons, General Sir William Fenwick Williams, 1st Baronet, of Kars.

== Governor of Hong Kong ==
On 19 October 1865, MacDonnell was appointed as the sixth Governor of Hong Kong, a position in which he served until 1872. During his tenure, MacDonnell developed Victoria Peak, which would eventually become the premier residential quarters in Hong Kong, accessible only to rich European merchants. MacDonnell also ordered the construction of a hospital which catered to the needs of the local Chinese population. In addition, he legalised gambling in Hong Kong which led to social problems and was later made illegal once again. In 1871 he was gazetted K.C.M.G.

Finally, MacDonnell's administration was marred by a huge budget deficit, which resulted in the government asking The Hongkong and Shanghai Banking Corporation for a financial aid package. The administration was also damaged by the actions of the Canton Customs agency, who patrolled the waters off Hong Kong and boarded ships to search for smuggled goods. This was called by Hong Kong's British merchant community a blockade, and affected Hong Kong's economy for the next 20 years.

== Marriage and retirement ==
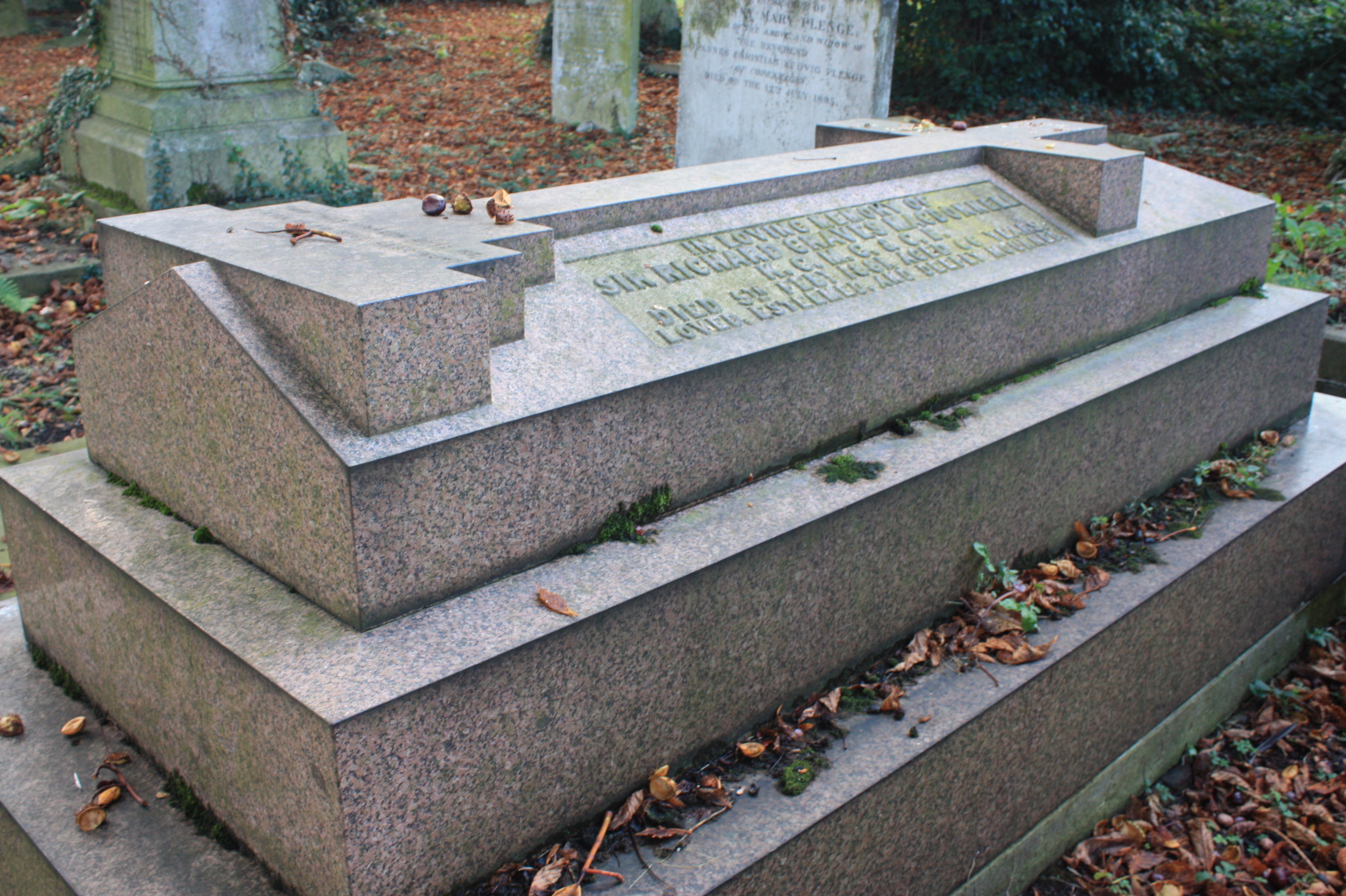
The grave of Sir Richard Graves MacDonnell, Kensal Green Cemetery

In 1847, MacDonnell married Blanche Ann, daughter of Francis Skurray of Beckington, Somerset, who lived at Stanhope Place, Hyde Park and Percy Cross Lodge, Fulham, before retiring to 5 Brunswick Square, Brighton. Sir Richard and Lady MacDonnell lived near Hyde Park in London and after his retirement in 1872 they spent much time in Italy and France; Sir Richard died at Hyères, 5 February 1881.

Both are buried in Kensal Green Cemetery, on the southern side. They died without children.

== Publications with his involvement ==
- The Church of the Future, an address by the Rev. Thomas Binney in 1859
- Christian Union, as discussed by the Bishop of Adelaide
- Sir R. C. MacDonnell, &c.,, 1859
- A lecture on 'Australia,' Dublin, 1864

== Places named after him or his wife ==
Named after Richard MacDonnell:

- The MacDonnell Ranges in the south of the Northern Territory of Australia.
- Port MacDonnell is the most eastern port in South Australia
- MacDonnell Creek in the northern Flinders Ranges
- Lake MacDonnell in the far west of South Australia
- Sir Richard Peninsula between Murray Mouth and Goolwa in South Australia
- MacDonnell Road in Mid-Levels on Hong Kong Island, which gives its name to the MacDonnell Road stop of the Hong Kong Peak Tram
- MacDonnell Street in Yarralumla, Australian Capital Territory
- MacDonnell Peninsula on the east end of Kangaroo Island

Named after Blanche MacDonnell:

- Blanchetown on the Murray River in South Australia
- The inner harbour of Streaky Bay is known as Blancheport
- Blanchewater Station and waterhole on MacDonnell Creek

== See also ==
- History of Hong Kong

== Notes ==
Government offices
| Preceded by Charles Fitzgerald | Governor of The Gambia; 1847–1851 | Succeeded by Sir Arthur Edward Kennedy |
| Preceded by John Campbell | Lieutenant Governor of Saint Vincent; 1853–1854 | Succeeded by Edward John Eyre |
| Preceded by Sir Henry Fox Young | Governor of South Australia; 1855–1862 | Succeeded by Sir Dominick Daly |
| Preceded by Charles Hastings Doyle | Governor of Nova Scotia; 1864–1865 | Succeeded by Sir William Fenwick Williams |
| Preceded by Acting Administrator William Mercer | Governor of Hong Kong; 1866–1872 | Succeeded by Sir Arthur Edward Kennedy |
