= Arthur Kennedy (colonial administrator) =

British colonial administrator

Sir Arthur Kennedy GCMG CB
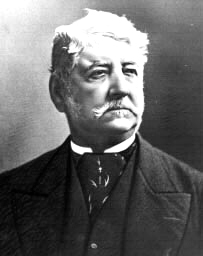

7th Governor of Hong Kong
- In office 16 April 1872 – 22 April 1877
- Monarch: Victoria
- Lieutenant: Henry Whitfield; Sir Francis Colborne
- Colonial Secretary: John Gardiner Austin
- Preceded by: Sir Richard Graves MacDonnell
- Succeeded by: Sir John Pope Hennessy

5th Governor of Queensland
- In office 20 July 1877 – 2 May 1883
- Monarch: Victoria
- Preceded by: William Cairns
- Succeeded by: Anthony Musgrave

Personal details
- Born: 5 April 1809 County Down, Ireland
- Died: 3 June 1883 (aged 74) near Aden in the Red Sea
- Spouse: Georgina MacCartney (m. 1839; died 1874)
- Children: 2 daughters, 1 son
- Education: Trinity College, Dublin
- Profession: soldier, colonial administrator

Chinese name
- Traditional Chinese: 堅尼地
- Simplified Chinese: 坚尼地
Transcriptions

堅彌地
- Traditional Chinese: 堅彌地
- Simplified Chinese: 坚彌地
Transcriptions
Yue: Cantonese
- Yale Romanization: Gīn nèih deih
- Jyutping: Gin^{1} nei^{4} dei^{6}

Sir Arthur Edward Kennedy GCMG CB (Chinese: 堅尼地; 5 April 1809 – 3 June 1883) was a British colonial administrator who served as governor of a number of British colonies, namely Sierra Leone, Western Australia, Vancouver Island, Hong Kong and Queensland.

== Early life and career ==
Arthur Kennedy was born in Cultra, County Down, Ireland on 5 April 1809, the fourth son of Hugh Kennedy and his wife Grace Dorothea (née Hughes). He was educated by private tutor and in 1823–24 attended Trinity College, Dublin, where he met his predecessor as Governor of Hong Kong, Sir Richard Graves MacDonnell.

Kennedy entered the British Army, and was gazetted an ensign in the 27th Foot 11th Regiment on 15 August 1827. Until 1837 he served with infantry regiments on Corfu. He spent 1838–1839 and 1841–1844 in British North America. In 1841 he purchased a Captaincy in the 68th Foot.

Kennedy returned to Ireland in 1846, and the following year sold his captaincy and took up an appointment with the Poor Law Commission. His job was to administer relief to the many inhabitants of County Clare who were affected by the Great Famine. He was shocked by what he saw and had serious differences with the local Landlord, Colonel Crofton Moore Vandeleur.

== Colonial services ==
In 1851, the famine having ended, Kennedy's position was abolished, and he applied for a position in the Colonial Service. In May 1852 he was appointed Governor of The Gambia, but before assuming office he was appointed Governor of Sierra Leone instead. He served in this office until 1854, during which time he made many administrative changes in an attempt to reform the corrupt and inefficient government. In 1854 he was appointed Consul-General in the Sherbro country in addition to his existing role.

=== Governor of Western Australia ===
In 1854, Kennedy was promoted to the position of Governor of Western Australia. He took up the position the following year, serving until 1862. He reputedly had an autocratic manner and was considered a despot by many Western Australians. Popular opinion quickly turned against him, and in August 1856 a public meeting was held in Perth to protest against his methods. During his tenure as governor, Western Australia flourished, essentially because of the large amount of British money that was spent in the colony under the system of penal transportation of convicts. However, when Kennedy resigned in 1862, he claimed that much of the colony's success was due to his legislative efforts. On his return to England, he was appointed a Commander of the Order of the Bath (CB).

=== Governor of Vancouver Island ===
Kennedy's next appointment came in July 1863. The decision had been made that Vancouver Island and British Columbia, which had previously been governed together by a single governor (Sir James Douglas), were each to have their own governor, and Kennedy was appointed Governor of Vancouver Island. Compared to his previous appointments, Vancouver Island was comparatively insignificant, and might be considered a demotion. Kennedy arrived at Vancouver Island in March 1864. Facing an extremely aggressive Legislative Assembly determined to challenge his executive power, Kennedy achieved little of note in his three years in office. During this time the colony fell into a disastrous economic depression, and Kennedy was unfairly blamed by the colony's inhabitants. With the creation of the united Colony of British Columbia, Kennedy left office in October 1866.

=== Governor of the West African Settlements ===
Kennedy returned to London, and in December 1867 he was knighted (KCB) and appointed Governor of the West African Settlements. He was appointed a Judge in the Mixed Commission Court at Sierra Leone. He served there until 1872. In 1871 he was created a KCMG.

=== Governor of Hong Kong ===
In 1872, Kennedy was appointed the 7th Governor of Hong Kong, a position in which he served until 1877. During his tenure, he created the Hong Kong dollar, which served as the unitary monetary unit for the territory. Since this time, the Hong Kong dollar has (albeit with a short period of disruption) served as the single monetary unit for the entire territory. He also developed Kennedy Town, the western end of Victoria City on the Hong Kong Island. Sir Arthur's style of governing was to do as little as possible and to be nice to everyone. 'Don't rock the boat' became a cornerstone of Hong Kong's political philosophy. Hong Kong prospered during this period.

=== Governor of Queensland ===
After his appointment as Governor of Hong Kong expired, Kennedy was immediately appointed Governor of Queensland, serving in that position until 1883. That was his last post in the Colonial Service. In 1881, Kennedy was created a GCMG in the 1881 Birthday Honours.

== Later life ==
On his resignation as Governor of Queensland, Kennedy boarded the Orient with the intention of returning to England. On 3 June 1883, when the Orient was off Aden in the Red Sea, Kennedy died. He was buried at sea.

== Personal life ==
In 1839, Kennedy married Georgina MacCartney, who died on 3 October 1874. They had two daughters and a son, Arthur Herbert Williams, who entered the army. His daughter, Elizabeth, married Richard Meade, 4th Earl of Clanwilliam. Kennedy's other daughter, Georgina Mildred, was honoured by having the Georgina River named after her in 1880, during his time in office in Queensland. William Landsborough had named this river the Herbert in 1861, but it was decided that it needed a new name because there was another river in Queensland that had that same name.

== Places named after him ==
- Kennedy Town, an area in the Western District of Hong Kong
- Kennedy Road, located in the Mid-levels of Wan Chai in Hong Kong
- Kennedy Lake, a large freshwater lake near Port Alberni, Vancouver Island, British Columbia
- Kennedy Range, in Gascoyne region of Western Australia
- Kennedy Sound overlooked by Mount Arthur in the Mackay Region, Queensland
- Arthur Terrace and Kennedy Terrace in the Ithaca and Red Hill suburbs of Brisbane, Queensland

Government offices
Preceded by Sir Richard Graves MacDonnell	Governor of The Gambia; 1851–1852	Succeeded by Luke Smythe O'Connor
Preceded by Norman William MacDonald	Governor of Sierra Leone; 1852–1854	Succeeded by Robert Dougan, acting
Preceded by Charles Fitzgerald	Governor of Western Australia; 1855–1862	Succeeded by John Stephen Hampton
Preceded by Sir James Douglas	Governor of Vancouver Island; 1864–1866	Post abolished
Preceded by John Jennings Kendall, acting	Governor of Sierra Leone; 1868–1872	Succeeded by Sir John Pope Hennessy
Preceded by Sir Richard Graves Macdonell	Governor of Hong Kong; 1872–1877	Succeeded by Sir John Pope Hennessy
Preceded by Sir William Wellington Cairns	Governor of Queensland; 1877–1883	Succeeded by Sir Anthony Musgrave
