= Hong Kong Heritage Discovery Centre =

Coordinates: 22.2993°N 114.1697°E

- 香港文物探知館
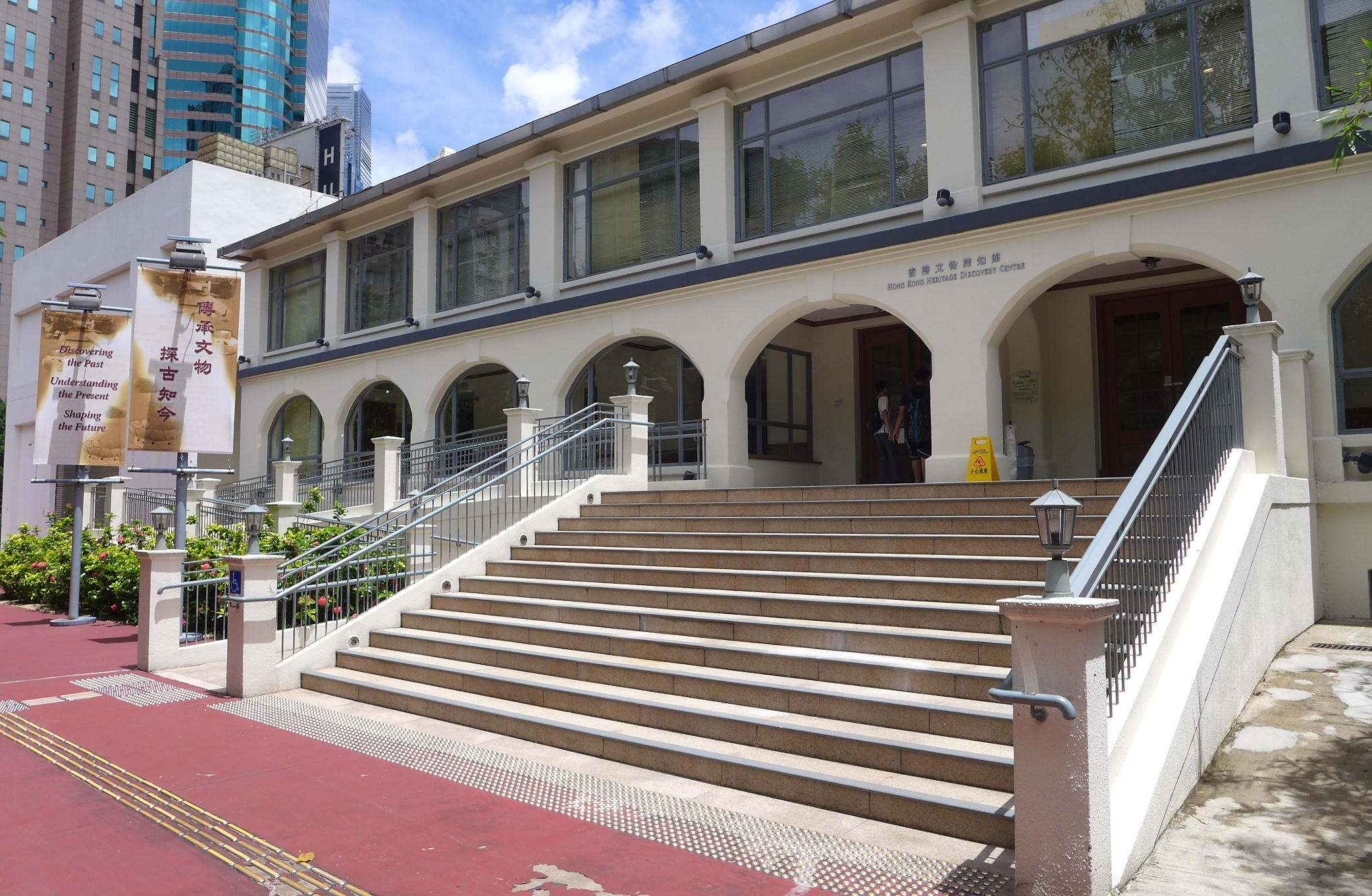
- The Hong Kong Heritage Discovery Centre
- Interactive map of the Hong Kong Heritage Discovery Centre area
- Former names: Whitfield Barracks

General information
- Location: Kowloon Park, Haiphong Road, Tsim Sha Tsui, Hong Kong
- Opened: circa 1910
- Landlord: Antiquities and Monuments Office

Website
- amo.gov.hk

Hong Kong Heritage Discovery Centre
- Traditional Chinese: 香港文物探知館
Transcriptions
Yue: Cantonese
- Yale Romanization: Hēung góng màhn maht taam jī gún
- Jyutping: Hoeng1 gong2 man4 mat6 taam3 zi1 gun1

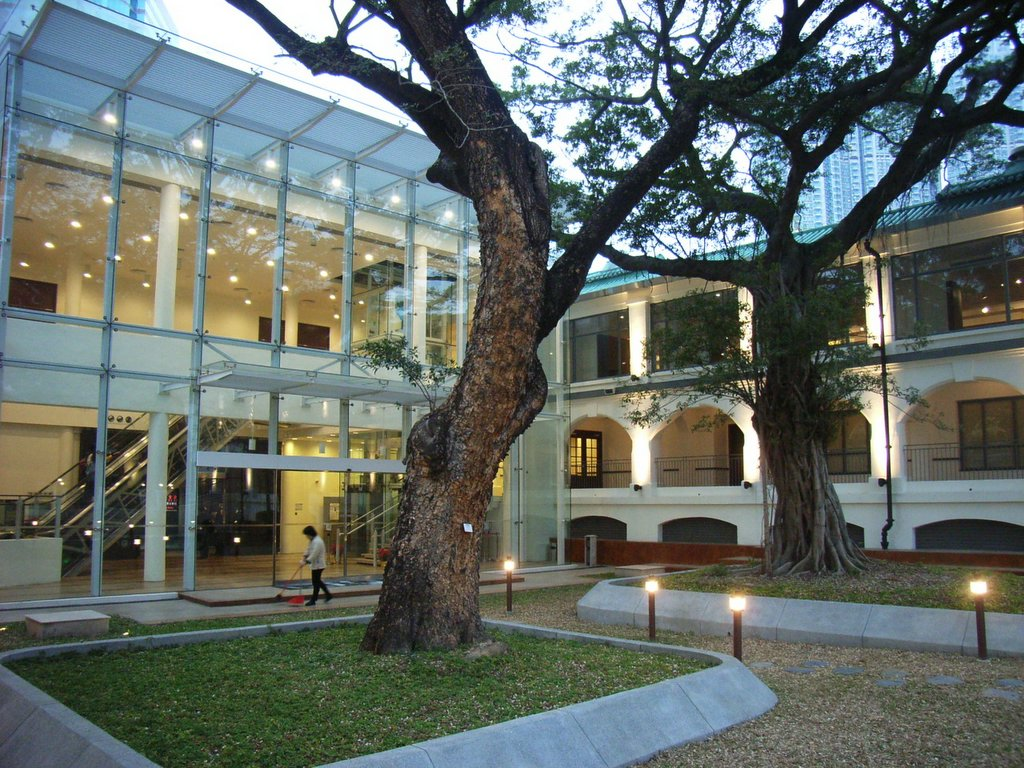
The courtyard

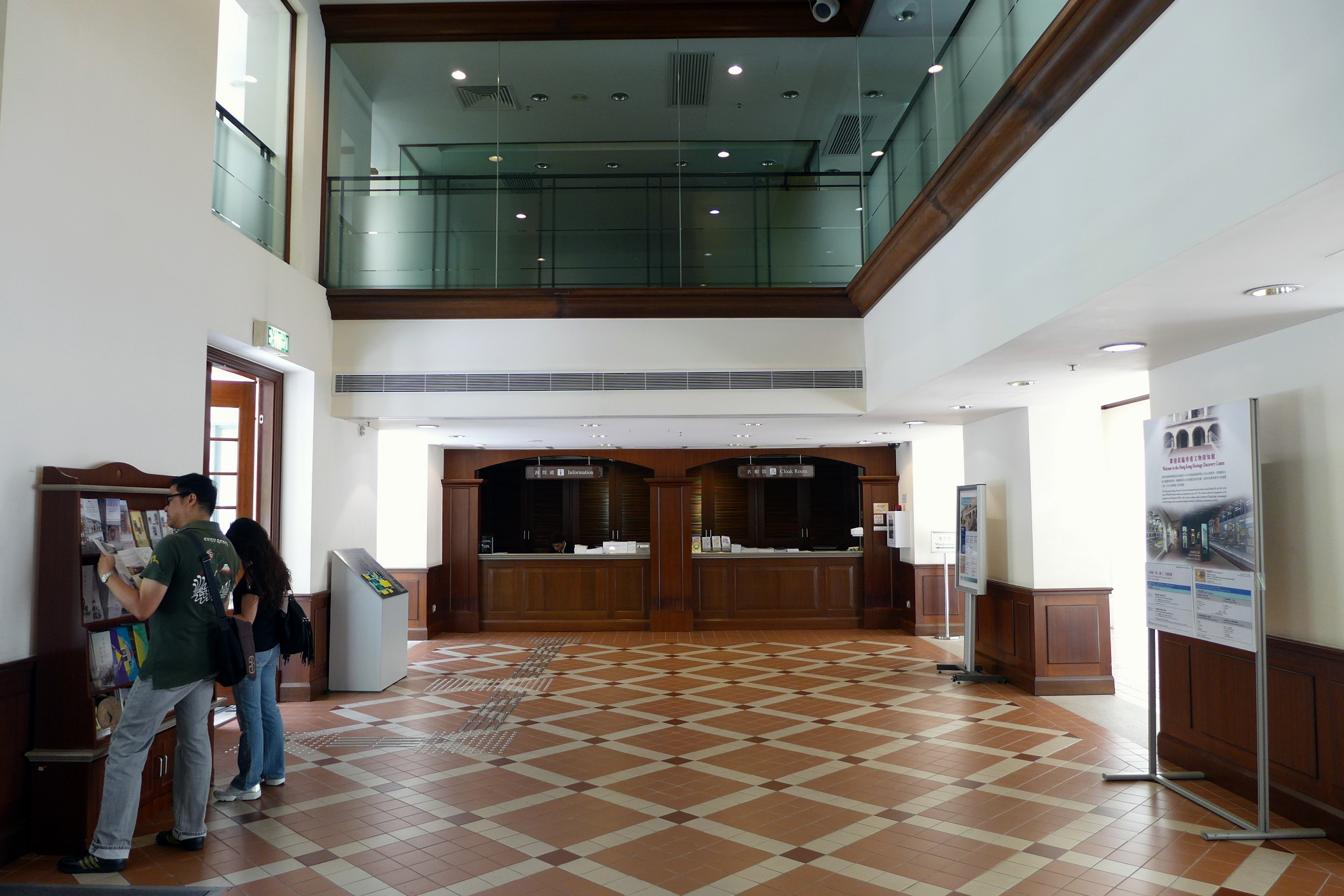
Lobby

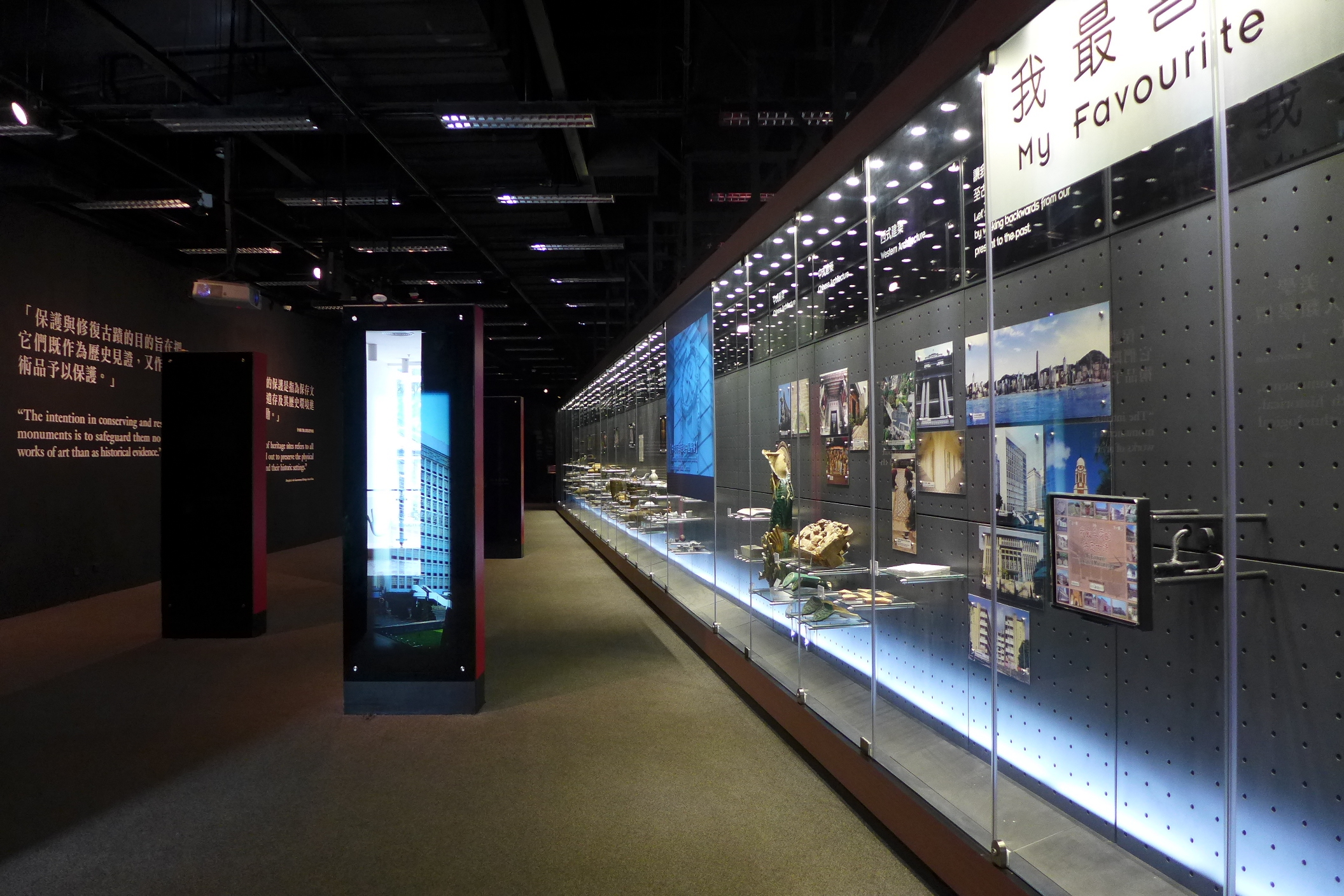
Exhibition of The Hong Kong Heritage Discovery Centre

The Hong Kong Heritage Discovery Centre is a public cultural center located in the Kowloon Park, Haiphong Road, Tsim Sha Tsui, Kowloon, Hong Kong. The Centre occupies the historic Blocks S61 and S62 of the former Whitfield Barracks at the Kowloon Park.

== History ==
The two blocks were built in circa 1910, when Hong Kong was under British rule as a crown colony. They were used for accommodating British troops until 1967 when the military lands were returned to the colonial government for redevelopment for leisure services. They were used by the Hong Kong Museum of History as its temporary premises from 1983 to 1998 until the new museum complex was built in Tsim Sha Tsui East.

== Discovery Centre ==
The Hong Kong Heritage Discovery Centre is under the management of the Antiquities and Monuments Office. It has opened its door to visitors since October 2005 with its thematic exhibition gallery, lecture hall, educational activity room and reference library. It includes a standing exhibition on Hong Kong's architectural heritage.

== Public transport ==
The centre is accessible within walking distance North West from Tsim Sha Tsui station via the MTR.

== See also ==
- Heritage conservation in Hong Kong
- Hong Kong Heritage Museum
- Hong Kong Museum of History
