= Bryan Dutton =

British Army officer

Major-General Bryan Dutton CB CBE
- Born: Bryan Hawkins Dutton; 1 March 1943 (age 83)
- Military career
- Allegiance: United Kingdom
- Branch: British Army
- Service years: 1963–1997
- Rank: Major-General
- Unit: Devonshire and Dorset Regiment
- Commands: 39th Infantry Brigade; Commander of British Forces in Hong Kong
- Conflicts: Operation Banner
- Awards: Companion of the Order of the Bath Commander of the Order of the British Empire
- Other work: Director-General of Leonard Cheshire Disability

Major-General Bryan Hawkins Dutton, CB, CBE (born 1 March 1943) is a former British Army officer who served the last Commander of British Forces in Hong Kong, from 1994 to 1997.

He was subsequently Director-General of the Leonard Cheshire Foundation from 1998 to 2008; during that period the charity changed its name to Leonard Cheshire Disability.

== Early life ==
The son of Ralph Dutton, by his marriage to Honor Morris, Dutton was educated at Lord Weymouth's Grammar School and Sandhurst.

== Military career ==
Dutton was commissioned into the Devonshire and Dorset Regiment in 1963. He served in British Guiana, Libya, Belize, and Germany, as well as postings to Northern Ireland and as an instructor at the School of Infantry from 1969 to 1971. From 1976 to 1978 he was a member of the Commander-in-Chief's Mission to Soviet Forces in Germany (BRIXMIS), then for a year was a company commander in the 1st Battalion the Devonshire and Dorsets. In 1979 he was mentioned in despatches for his service in Ireland and in 1990 was appointed a Commander of the Order of the British Empire for his work there.

He served on the Planning Staff in the Northern Ireland Office from 1979 to 1981, was an instructor at the Staff College during 1981–1982, and spent two years as Military Assistant to the Adjutant-General (1982–1984) before commanding the 1st Battalion the Devonshire and Dorset Regiment from 1984 to 1987. After some months on the Operations Staff at UK Land Forces, in 1987 he took up the command of the 39th Infantry Brigade for two years. he was Director of Public Relations (Army), from 1990 to 1992, Director of Infantry, 1992 to 1994.

In 1994 Dutton became the last Commander of British Forces in Hong Kong before the colony became a Special Administrative Region of the People's Republic of China.

=== Honorary appointments ===
He was Colonel Commandant, Prince of Wales' Division, from 1996 to 1999, and Colonel of the Devonshire and Dorset Regiment from 1998 to 2002.

== Civilian life ==
In 1972 Dutton married Angela Margaret Wilson, and they had one son and one daughter.

In retirement he was Director-General of the Leonard Cheshire Disability care charity from 1998 (when it was called the Leonard Cheshire Foundation) to 2008, and simultaneously Chairman of the Voluntary Organisations Disability Group from 2004 to 2008. He has served as a Governor of the Hayes Dashwood Foundation since 1999 and as Chairman of the Association for Research into Stammering in Childhood since 2009.

Military offices
Preceded by Sir John Foley	Commander of British Forces in Hong Kong; 1994–1997	Post disbanded
