= John Foley (British Army officer) =

British Army general

Lieutenant-General Sir John Foley KCB OBE MC DL
- Born: 22 April 1939 (age 87)
- Military career
- Allegiance: United Kingdom
- Branch: British Army
- Service years: 1959–1997
- Rank: Lieutenant-General
- Service number: 460829
- Unit: Special Air Service
- Commands: Commander British Forces in Hong Kong; Director SAS
- Awards: Knight Commander of the Order of the Bath; Officer of the Order of the British Empire; Military Cross

Lieutenant-General Sir John Paul Foley, KCB, OBE, MC, DL (born 22 April 1939) is a retired British Army officer with a long career in military intelligence. He is the great-grandson of Henry Hodgetts-Foley, and was educated at Bradfield College.

== Military career ==
Foley joined the Special Air Service as an enlisted man during his National Service. He served in BRIXMIS during the 1970s. He was commissioned into the Rifle Brigade in 1959 and rose to become Director SAS in 1983. He was later Director of General Intelligence, which involved ensuring intelligence provision in the theatre of war and making assessments for government ministers at the time of the Gulf War in 1990, and became Commander of British Forces in Hong Kong in 1992, before being named Chief of Defence Intelligence in 1994. He left that post, retiring from the Army three years later, in 1997.

== Later life ==
In October 1999, he replaced Sir William Rous as Chairman of the British Greyhound Racing Board but resigned just six months later. In 2000, he was appointed Lieutenant Governor of Guernsey, and served in that post for five years before retiring to his native Herefordshire. He was appointed High Sheriff of Herefordshire and Worcestershire in 2006 and Vice-Lieutenant of Herefordshire in 2010.

Military offices
Preceded by Peter de la Billière	Director SAS; 1983–1985	Succeeded by Michael Wilkes
Preceded by Sir Peter Duffell	Commander of British Forces in Hong Kong; 1992–1994	Succeeded by Bryan Dutton
Preceded by Sir John Walker	Chief of Defence Intelligence; 1994–1997	Succeeded by Sir Alan West
Government offices
Preceded by Sir John Coward	Lieutenant Governor of Guernsey; 2000–2005	Succeeded by Sir Fabian Malbon
Honorary titles
Preceded by Andrew Grant	High Sheriff of Herefordshire and Worcestershire; 2006	Succeeded by John Yorke
