= Francis Ventris =

British general (1857–1929)

Major-General Francis Ventris CB
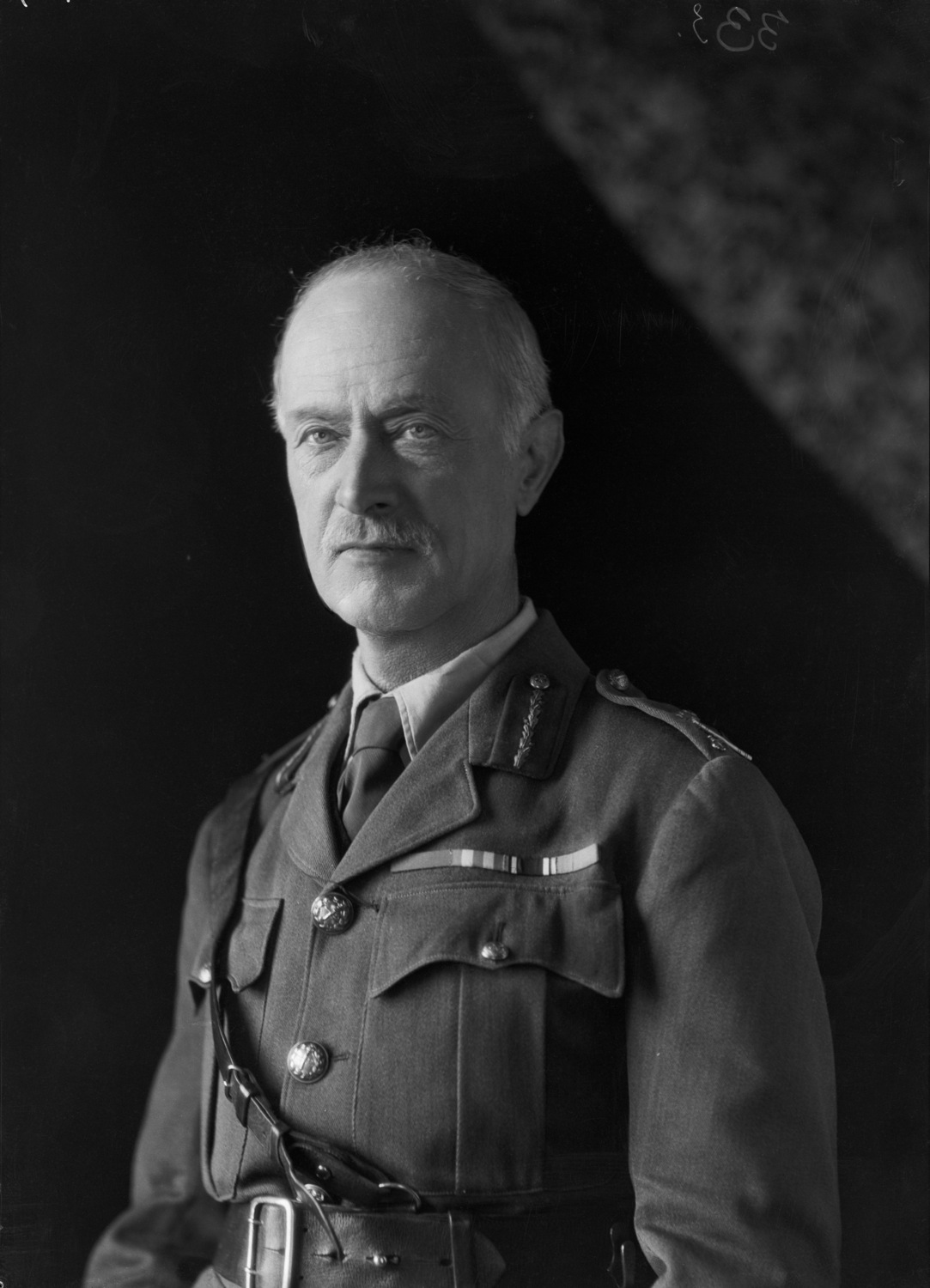
- Photographed in 1927
- Born: 1857
- Died: 1929 (aged 71–72)
- Military career
- Allegiance: United Kingdom
- Branch: British Army
- Rank: Major-General
- Commands: 25th Division; Commander of British Forces in China
- Conflicts: World War I
- Awards: Companion of the Order of the Bath

Major-General Francis Ventris CB (1857 – 1929) was Commander of British Forces in China.

== Military career ==
The son of Edward Favell Ventris, who was Vicar of West Mersea in Essex before becoming Rector of Church Aston, Newport, Shropshire, by his wife Rose (née Fisher), he was educated at Adams' Grammar School in Newport. Ventris was commissioned into the 44th Regiment of Foot in 1875. He became an Adjutant of that Regiment in 1880. In 1897, having served as an Assistant Adjutant-General in India, he was given command of a district in that country. He was placed on half-pay in late December 1902.

In July 1903, after coming off of half-pay, he was promoted to temporary brigadier general and assigned to commanding the British troops in North China, taking over from Major General O'Moore Creagh. He was promoted to major general in October.

He retired in 1909 but was then recalled at the start of World War I to become General Officer Commanding 25th Division in September 1914. In 1915 he was appointed Commander of British Forces in China, a post he relinquished in 1921.

He was given the colonelcy of the Essex Regiment in 1904, a position he held until his death.

He died in 1929. He had married Helen Maud Davies in 1883, and was father to three sons and two daughters. His eldest son Edward (1885–1938) was the father of Michael Ventris, who deciphered Linear B. His youngest son Second Lieutenant Alan Favell Ventris of the South Lancashire Regiment was killed in action near Ypres on 14 September 1915, age 18 years, and is interred at Birr Crossroads Cemetery.

Military offices
| Preceded by New formation | General Officer Commanding the 25th Division; September 1914–May 1915 | Succeeded by Beauchamp Doran |
| Preceded by Francis Kelly | Commander of British Forces in China; 1915–1921 | Succeeded by Sir George Kirkpatrick |
| Preceded by Hon. John Jocelyn Bourke | Colonel of the Essex Regiment; 1904–1929 | Succeeded by John Cartwright Harding-Newman |
