= William Gascoigne (British Army officer) =

British Army general

Major-General Sir William Gascoigne KCMG
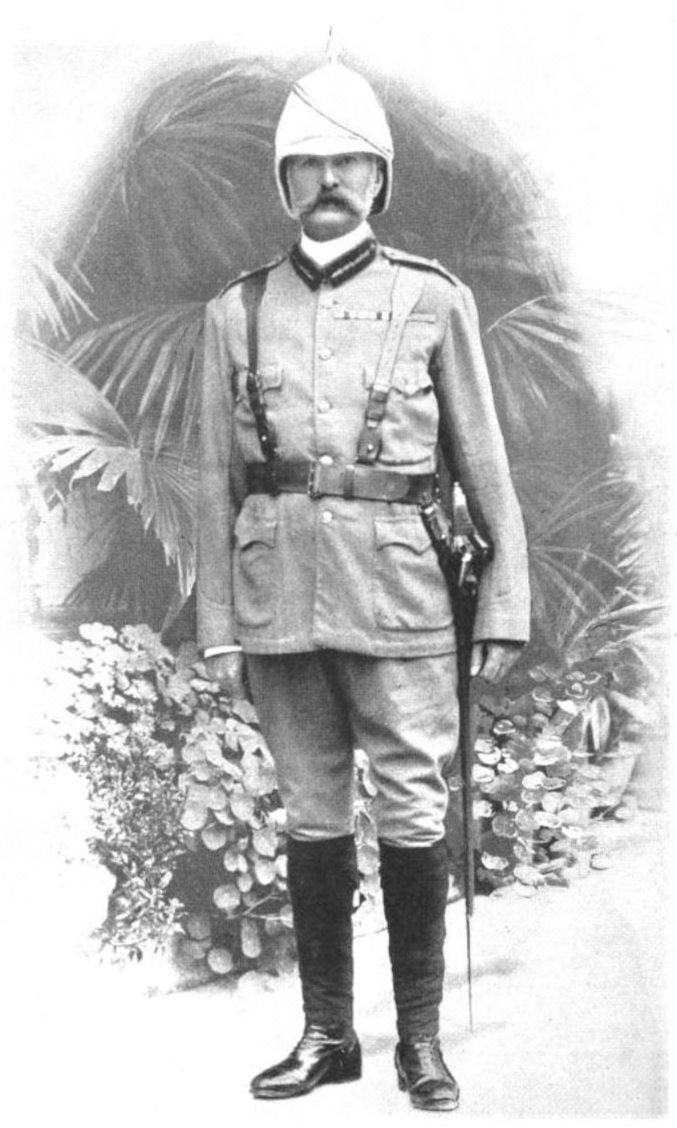
- In The Sketch, 11 July 1900
- Born: 29 May 1844; London, England
- Died: 9 September 1926 (aged 82); Boscombe, England
- Spouse: Helen Smith (m. 1875)
- Military career
- Allegiance: United Kingdom
- Branch: British Army
- Rank: Major-General
- Commands: General Officer Commanding the Militia of Canada; Commander of British Troops in China and Hong Kong
- Awards: Knight Commander of the Order of St. Michael and St. George

Major-General Sir William Julius Gascoigne KCMG (29 May 1844 – 9 September 1926) was a British Army officer and served as General Officer Commanding the Militia of Canada from 1895 to 1898.

== Military career ==
William Julius Gascoigne was born in London on 29 May 1844. He was commissioned into the Scots Fusilier Guards in 1863. He was appointed Adjutant in 1867, served in Egypt in 1882 and in Sudan in 1885.

In 1895 he was promoted to major-general and appointed General Officer Commanding the Militia of Canada. In 1898 he was appointed Commander of British Troops in China and Hong Kong.

Gascoigne was also the last Lieutenant Governor of Hong Kong (serving from 1898 to 1902), but the role was ceremonial and in lapsed use since the 1870s.

He was appointed a Companion of the Order of St Michael and St George (CMG) in 1899, and knighted as a Knight Commander (KCMG) of the same order in November 1900 in recognition of services during the Boxer Rebellion in China.

He died in Boscombe on 9 September 1926.

Gascoigne Road in Kowloon, Hong Kong is named after him.

== Family ==
In 1875, he married Helen Smith, daughter of Martin T. Smith, and widow of Hon. Arthur F. Egerton.

Military offices
Preceded by Lord Treowen	General Officer Commanding the Militia of Canada; 1895-1898	Succeeded by Sir Edward Hutton
Preceded by Sir Wilsone Black	Commander of British Troops in China and Hong Kong; 1898–1903	Succeeded by Villiers Hatton
