= Commander British Forces in Hong Kong =

Commander of the British Army in Hong Kong

The Commander British Forces in Hong Kong (CBF) was a senior British Army officer who acted as military advisor to the Governor of Hong Kong and was in charge of the British Forces Overseas Hong Kong. The officeholder of this post concurrently assumed the office of the Lieutenant Governor of Hong Kong before the abolition of the position in 1902.

== Structure ==
The Governor was advised by the Commander British Forces in Hong Kong (CBF) on all military actions. During the 1980s and 1990s, the CBF was normally a career Major General or Lieutenant General from the British Army. Until 1966, the CBF was an ex officio member of the Legislative Council.

=== Subordinate Units ===
The Commander British Forces in Hong Kong (CBFHK) held overall command of all British military formations stationed in the territory, including regular British Army units, the Brigade of Gurkhas, elements of the Royal Navy and Royal Air Force, as well as locally raised units under the Crown. Among these local formations were the Royal Hong Kong Regiment (The Volunteers) (RHKR(V)) and the Hong Kong Military Service Corps (HKMSC). The RHKR(V) was a locally raised Crown regiment established under the Royal Hong Kong Regiment Ordinance (Cap. 199), enacted in 1957.

From the early 1960s, the regiment was affiliated to the Royal Armoured Corps and, from 1970, was formally incorporated into its order of battle and placed under the operational command of the CBFHK. In 1970, subsidiary regulations (L.N. 190 of 1970) updated the Regiment’s administrative framework under Cap. 199.

The HKMSC, formed in 1962, was a regular unit of the British Army composed of locally enlisted personnel. It provided administrative, transport, and technical support across the Hong Kong garrison and was directly funded by the Ministry of Defence.

== Commanders ==
Commanders have included:

Commander British Forces in Hong Kong

- 1843–1848 Major-General George d'Aguilar
- 1848–1851 Major-General William Staveley
- 1851–1854 Major-General William Jervois

Commander British Troops in China and Hong Kong

- 1854–1857 Major-General Sir Robert Garrett
- 1857–1858 Major-General Thomas Ashburnham
- 1858–1859 Major-General Sir Charles van Straubenzee
- 1860–1861 Major-General Sir James Grant
- 1861–1862 Major-General Sir John Michel
- 1862–1863 Major-General Sir Charles Staveley
- 1863–1864 Major-General William Brown
- 1864–1867 Major-General Sir Philip Guy
- 1867–1869 Major-General James Brunker

Commander British Troops in China, Hong Kong, and the Straits Settlements

- 1869–1874 Major-General Henry Whitfield
- 1874–1878 Lieutenant General Sir Francis Colborne
- 1878–1882 Lieutenant General Edward Donovan
- 1882–1885 Lieutenant General John Sargent
- 1885–1889 Lieutenant General Sir William Cameron

Commander British Troops in China and Hong Kong

- 1889–1890 Major-General Sir James Edwards
- 1890–1895 Major-General Sir George Barker
- 1895–1898 Major-General Sir Wilsone Black
- 1898–1903 Major-General Sir William Gascoigne

Commander British Troops in Southern China

- 1903–1906 Major-General Villiers Hatton
- 1906–1910 Major-General Robert Broadwood
- 1910–1913 Major-General Sir Charles Anderson
- 1913–1915 Major-General Francis Kelly

Commander British Troops in Northern China

- 1900–1901 Major-General Sir Alfred Gaselee
- 1901–1903 Major-General O'Moore Creagh
- 1901–1906 Brigadier-General Francis Ventris (major-general from October 1903)
- 1906–1910 Brigadier-General Wallscourt Waters
- 1910–1914 Brigadier-General Edward Cooper
- 1914–1915 Brigadier-General Nathaniel Barnardiston (major-general from February 1915)

Commander British Forces in China

- 1915–1921 Major-General Francis Ventris
- 1921–1922 Major-General George Kirkpatrick
- 1922–1925 Major-General Sir John Fowler

Commander British Troops in Southern China

- 1925–1929 Major-General Charles Luard
- 1929–1932 Major-General James Sandilands

Commander British Troops in Northern China

- Jan–Dec 1927 Major-General John Duncan (also Shanghai Defence Force)
- 1927–1929 Major-General Alexander Wardrop

Commander British Troops in China

- 1932–1935 Lieutenant-General Oswald Borrett
- 1935–1938 Major-General Arthur Bartholomew
- 1938–1941 Major-General Edward Grasett
- Aug–Dec 1941 Major-General Christopher Maltby

Note: from 1941 to 1945 Hong Kong was under Japanese occupation
Commander British Forces in Hong Kong

- 1945–1946 Major-General Sir Francis Festing
- 1946–1948 Major-General Sir George Erskine
- 1948–1949 Major-General Francis Matthews
- Jun–Sep 1949 Lieutenant-General Sir Francis Festing
- 1949–1951 Lieutenant-General Sir Robert Mansergh
- 1951–1952 Major-General Geoffrey Evans
- 1952–1954 Major-General Terence Airey
- 1954–1955 Lieutenant-General Cecil Sugden
- 1955–1957 Lieutenant-General Sir William Stratton
- 1957–1960 Lieutenant-General Sir Edric Bastyan
- 1960–1961 Lieutenant-General Sir Roderick McLeod
- 1961–1963 Lieutenant-General Sir Reginald Hewetson
- 1963–1964 Lieutenant-General Sir Richard Craddock
- 1964–1966 Lieutenant-General Sir Denis O'Connor
- 1966–1968 Lieutenant-General Sir John Worsley
- 1968–1970 Lieutenant-General Sir Basil Eugster
- 1970–1973 Lieutenant-General Sir Richard Ward
- 1973–1976 Lieutenant-General Sir Edwin Bramall
- 1976–1978 Lieutenant-General Sir John Archer
- 1978–1980 Major-General Sir Roy Redgrave
- 1980–1982 Major-General John Chapple
- 1982–1985 Major-General Derek Boorman
- 1985–1987 Major-General Anthony Boam
- 1987–1989 Major-General Garry Johnson
- 1989–1992 Major General Peter Duffell
- 1992–1994 Major-General John Foley
- 1994–1997 Major-General Bryan Dutton

== Residences ==
- Flagstaff House, 1840s–1978
- Headquarters House, 1978–1997

== See also ==
- Lieutenant Governor of Hong Kong
- Commander of Hong Kong Garrison, People's Liberation Army of the People's Republic of China
