= Health Education Exhibition and Resource Centre =

Coordinates: 22°17′54″N 114°10′17″E

衛生教育展覽及資料中心 Health Education Exhibition & Resource Centre
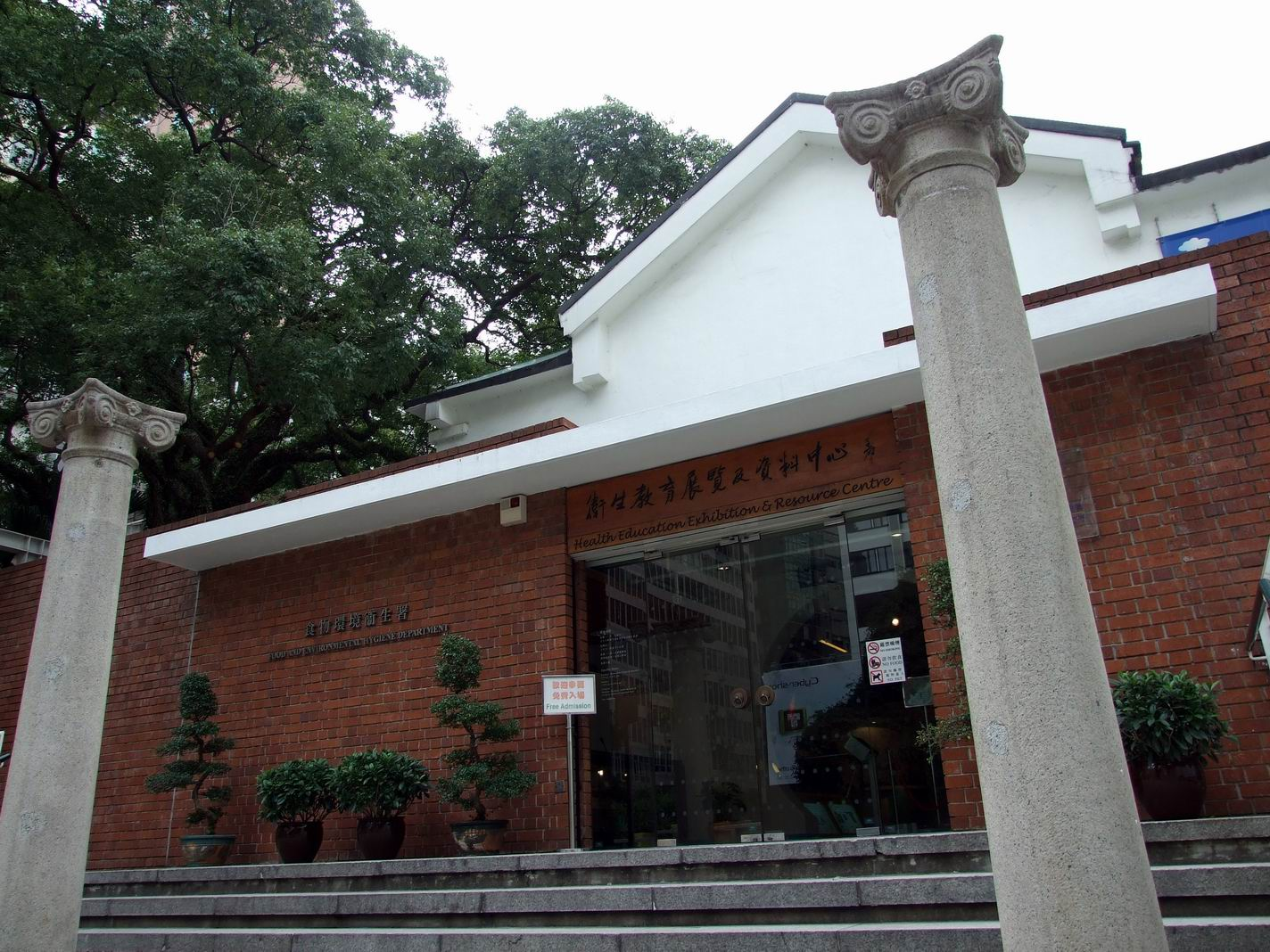
- Established: 17 May 1997; 29 years ago
- Location: Kowloon Park, Tsim Sha Tsui, Yau Tsim Mong District, Hong Kong
- Type: Museum
- Curator: TSANG Kit Yu
- Public transit access: MTR Tsim Sha Tsui station
- Website: 官方網站

Health Education Exhibition and Resource Centre
- Traditional Chinese: 衞生教育展覽及資料中心
Transcriptions
Standard Mandarin
- Hanyu Pinyin: Wèishēng Jiàoyù Zhǎnlǎn jí Zīliào Zhōngxīn

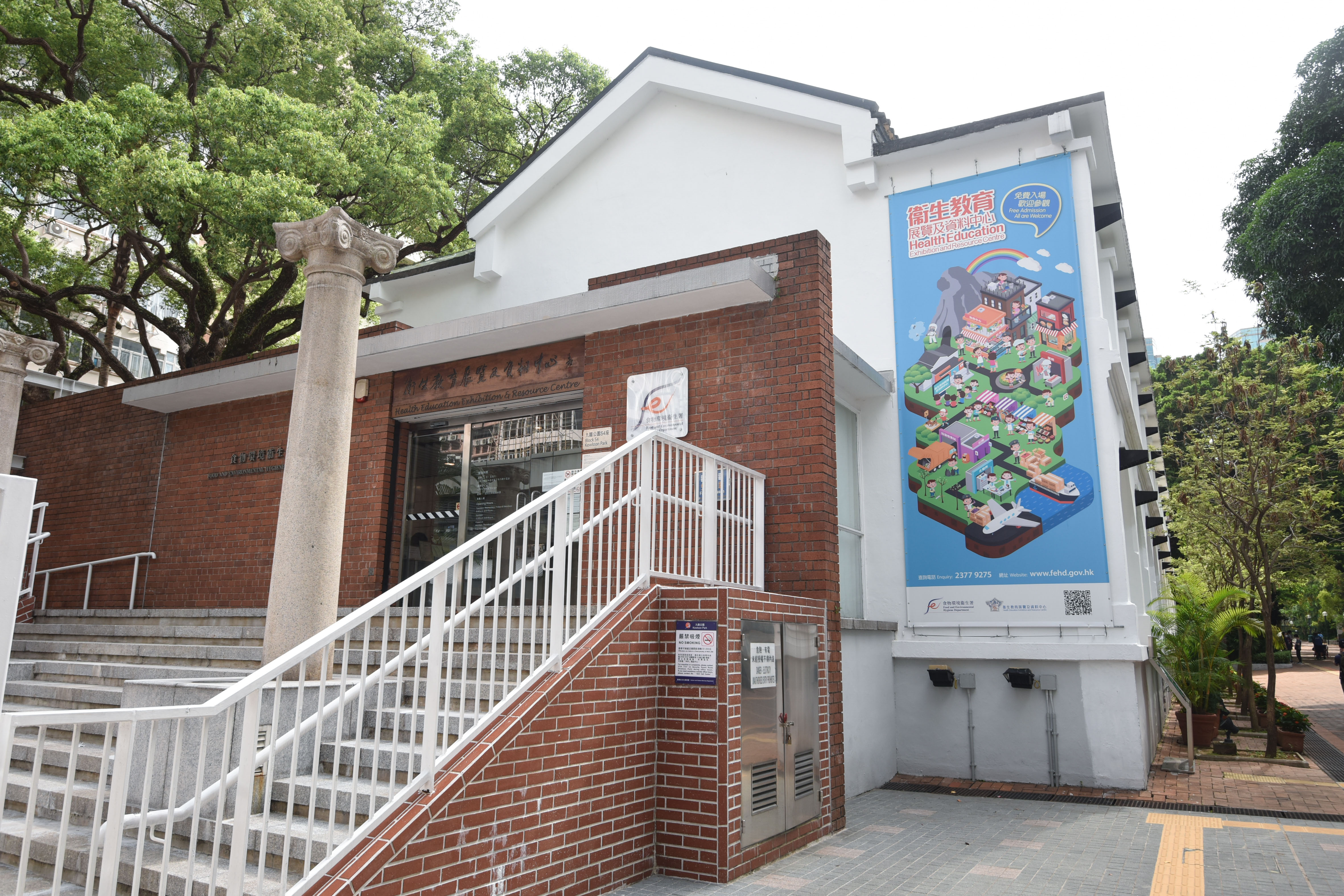
Health Education Exhibition and Resource Centre

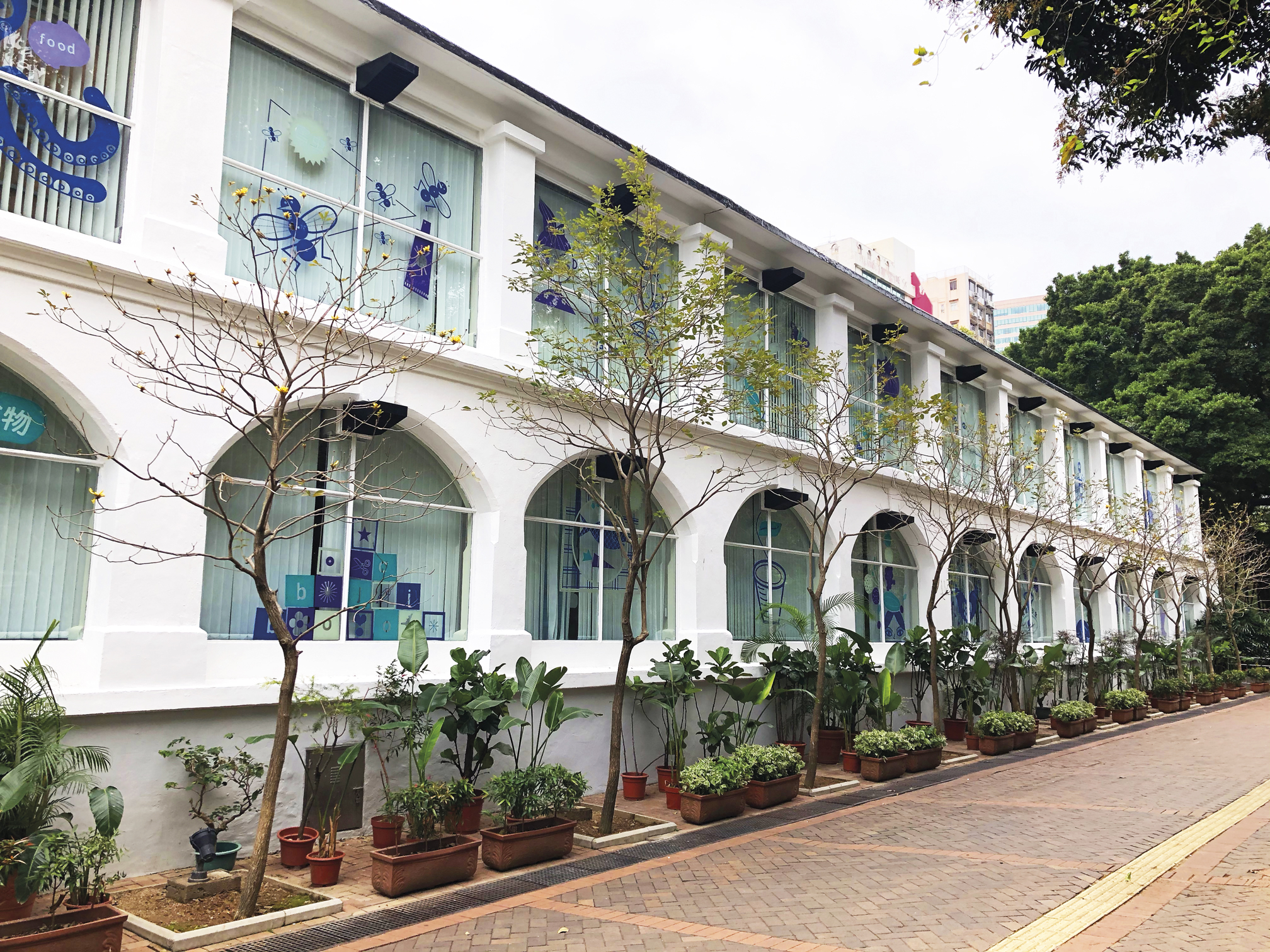
Former Whitfield Barracks

The Health Education Exhibition and Resources Centre opened on 17 May 1997 in Kowloon Park, Tsim Sha Tsui, Hong Kong. It is under the management of the Food and Environmental Hygiene Department of the Government of Hong Kong.

== History ==
The Health Education Exhibition and Resource Centre is housed in a Grade I historic building (Block S4 of the former Whitfield Barracks) in Kowloon Park. In September 1993, the former Urban Council endorsed a proposal to use the building to house an Urban Council Health Education Exhibition and Resource Centre.

== Floor plan ==
The centre comprises an exhibition area on two floors and an outdoor health education garden.

The exhibition on the ground floor introduce the general information of Food and Environmental Hygiene Department and then focuses on various aspects of food and environmental hygiene – high-risk foods, GM foods and food additives. The topics are thoroughly explained through computer games, videos and photos, etc.

The ground floor lecture room holds regular seminars.

There is also a souvenir counter on the ground floor.

The first floor hosts temporary exhibitions in the centre of the hall and permanent exhibitions on environmental hygiene, kitchen hygiene, public toilets and pest control.

An additional resources center is located on the second floor.

== Exhibition Content ==
A permanent exhibition on the theme of "Food Safety, Environmental Hygiene and You" is staged at the centre.

== Activities ==
The centre organises extra-curricular programmes such as school and group visits, a volunteer scheme and a health troop membership scheme.
