= Haiphong Road =

Road in Tsim Sha Tsui, Hong Kong

Coordinates: 22.2981°N 114.1704°E

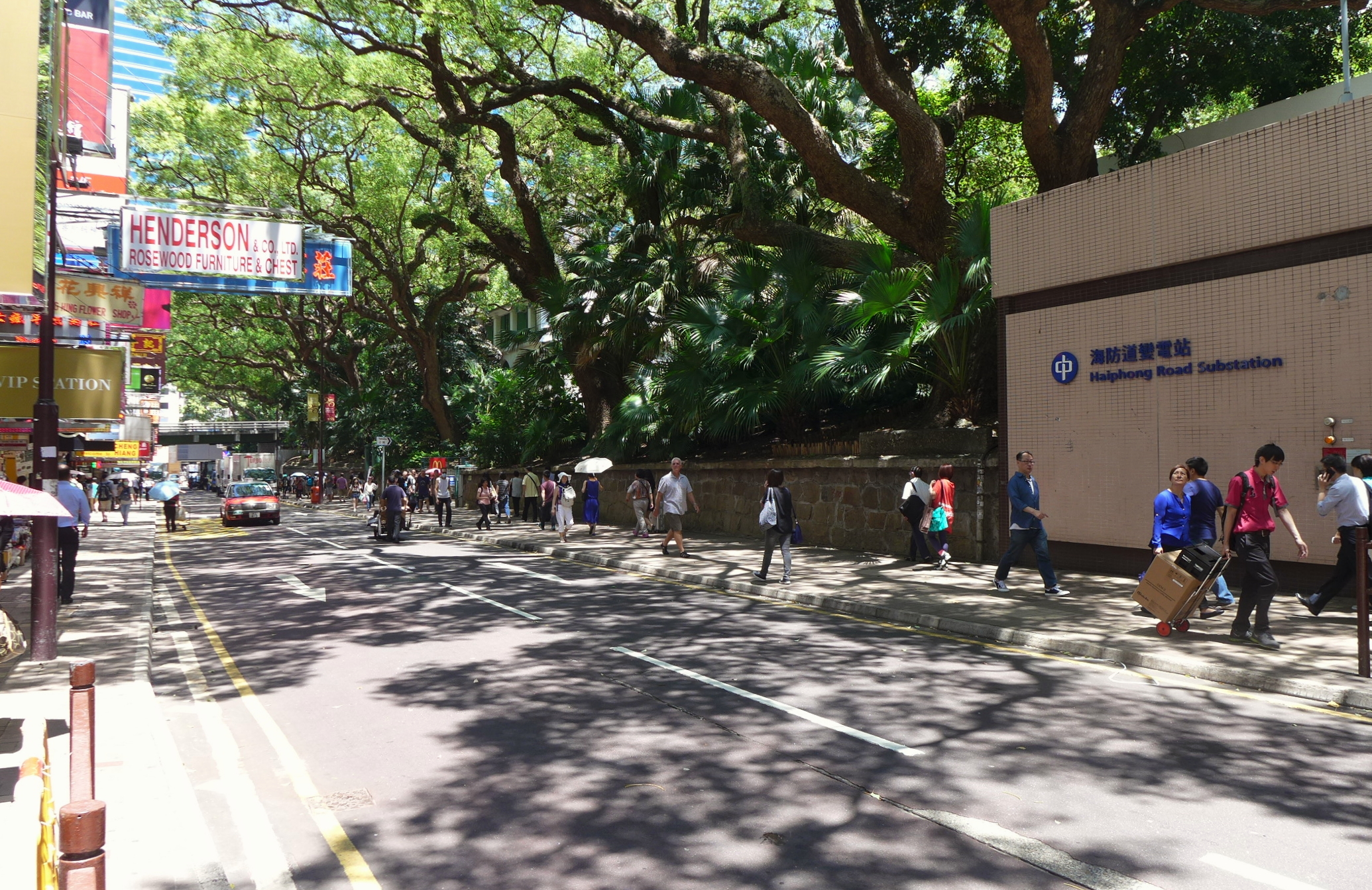
- Chinese: 海防道
Transcriptions
Standard Mandarin
- Hanyu Pinyin: Hǎifáng Dào
Yue: Cantonese
- Jyutping: hoi2 fong4 dou6

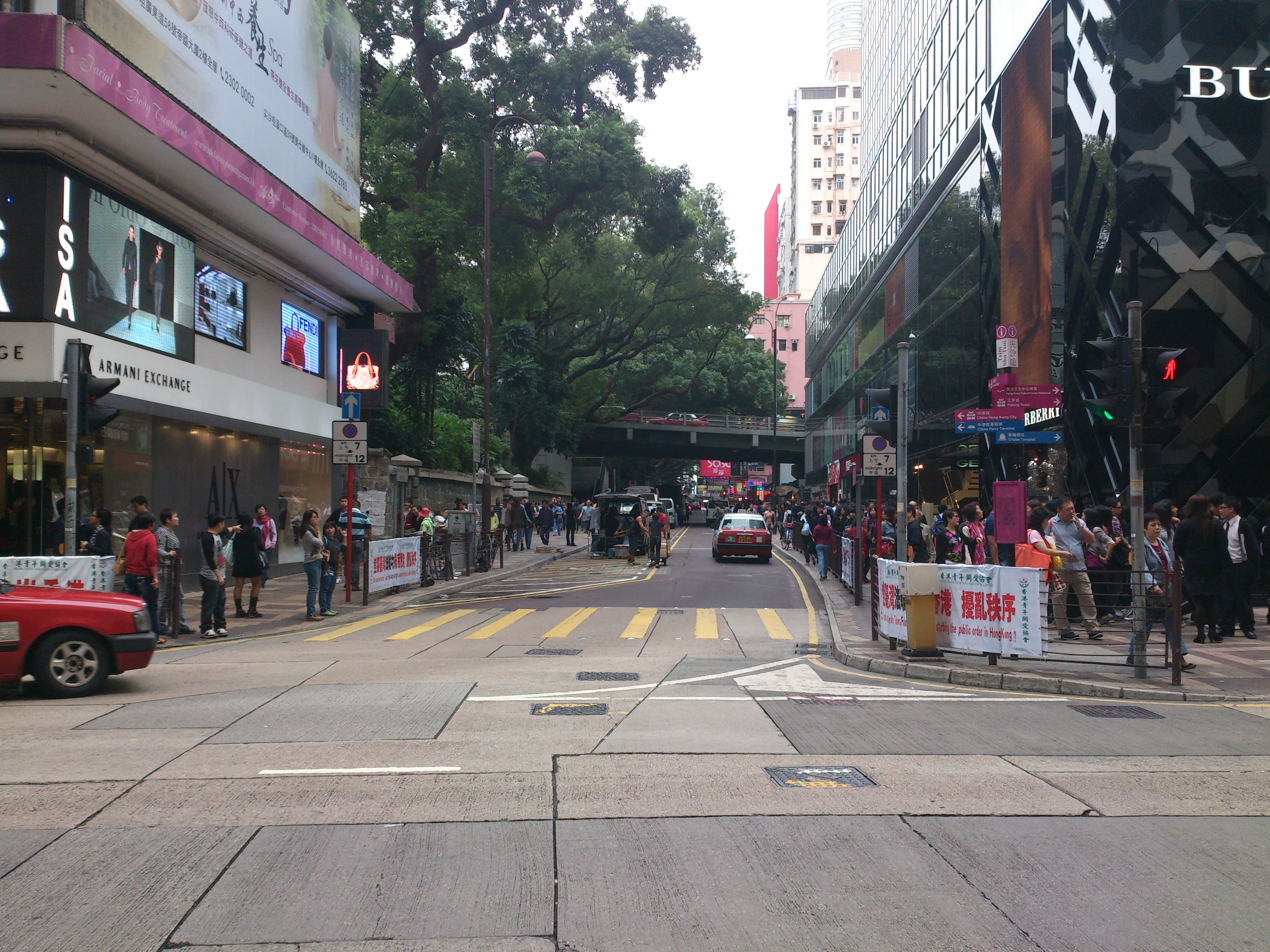
Haiphong Road view from Canton Road.

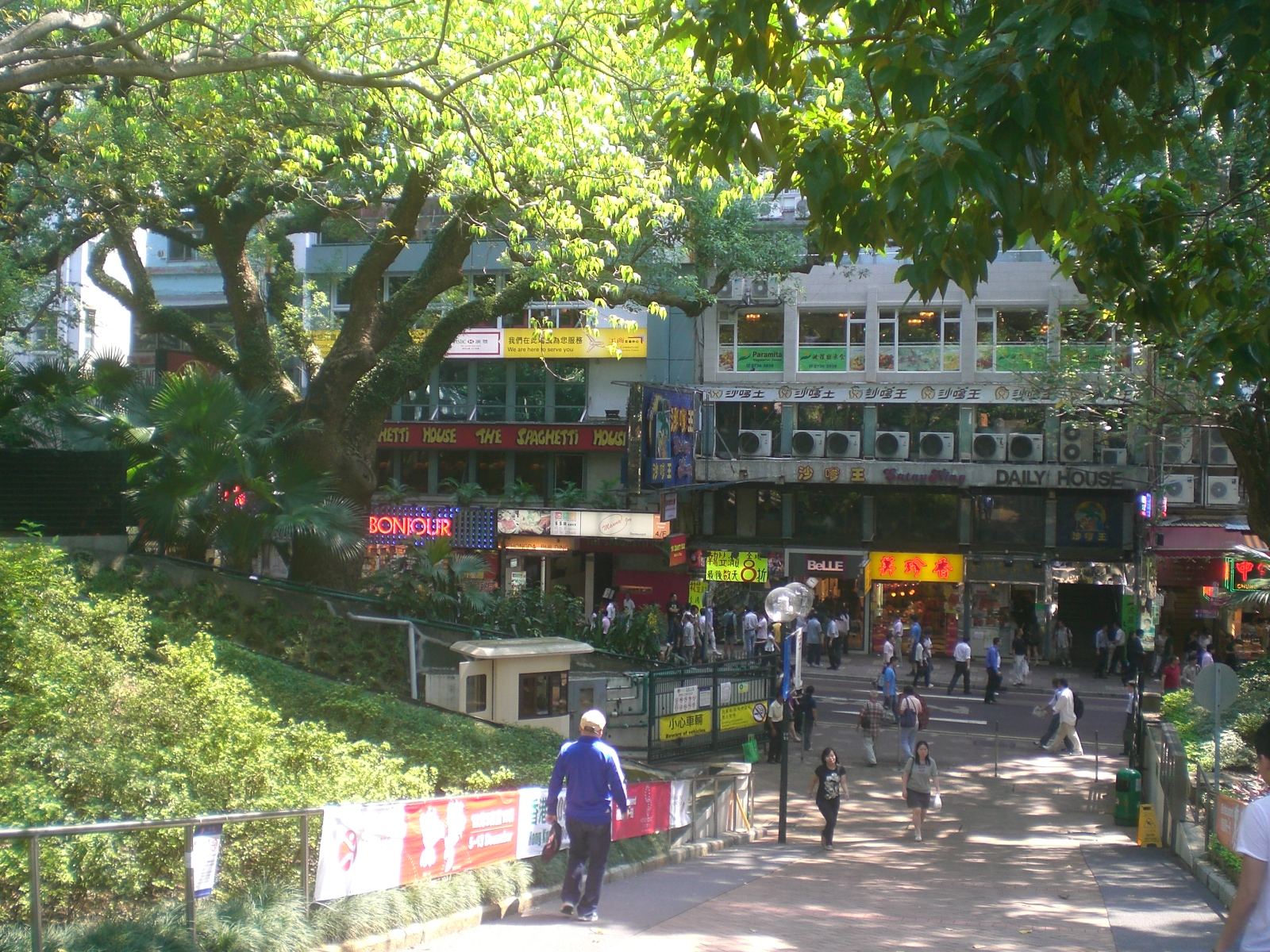
Haiphong Road viewed from Kowloon Park.

Haiphong Road (Chinese: 海防道; Jyutping: hoi2 fong4 dou6) is a road south of Kowloon Park, Tsim Sha Tsui, Hong Kong. The road links Canton Road and Nathan Road.

== History ==
It was initially named as Elgin Street but its name changed in 1909 to Haiphong, a city in Vietnam to avoid confusion with another Elgin Street on the Hong Kong Island. As such, it is one of the few streets in Hong Kong not named for a Chinese or English subject. Along with Nathan Road it was one of the first two streets laid out in Tsim Sha Tsui. Indian merchants, mostly Hindus from the province of Sindh, began establishing shops on the street in the 1920s, supplying Indian goods to soldiers stationed in the adjacent Whitfield Barracks.

== Features ==
Significant locations along this street include the Fok Tak Temple, a century-old temple site that was "once the centre for worship for Kowloon residents"; the Kowloon Masjid and Islamic Centre; and the Haiphong Road Temporary Market, thought to be the oldest such market in Hong Kong.

== See also ==
- List of streets and roads in Hong Kong
