= Whitfield Barracks =

Barracks in Tsim Sha Tsui, Kowloon, Hong Kong

Coordinates: 22.299321°N 114.16977°E

- 威菲路兵房
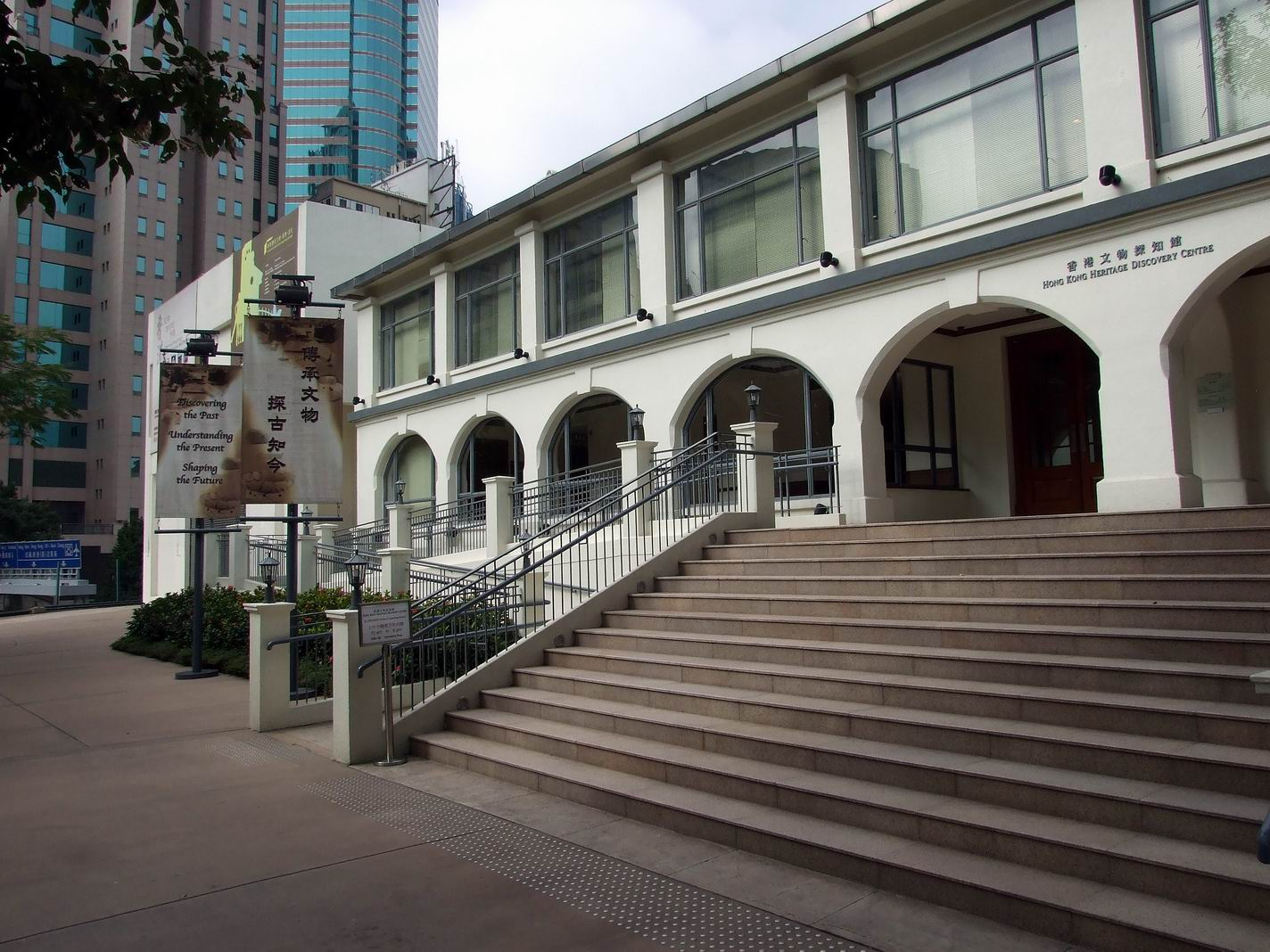
- Hong Kong Heritage Discovery Centre
- Interactive map of the Whitfield Barracks area

General information
- Classification: Grade I historic buildings
- Location: Tsim Sha Tsui, Kowloon, Hong Kong
- Named for: Henry Wase Whitfield
- Construction started: 1890s

Whitfield Barracks
- Traditional Chinese: 威菲路兵房
Transcriptions
Yue: Cantonese
- Yale Romanization: Wāi fēi louh bīng fòhng
- Jyutping: Wai1 fei2 lou6 bing1 fong4

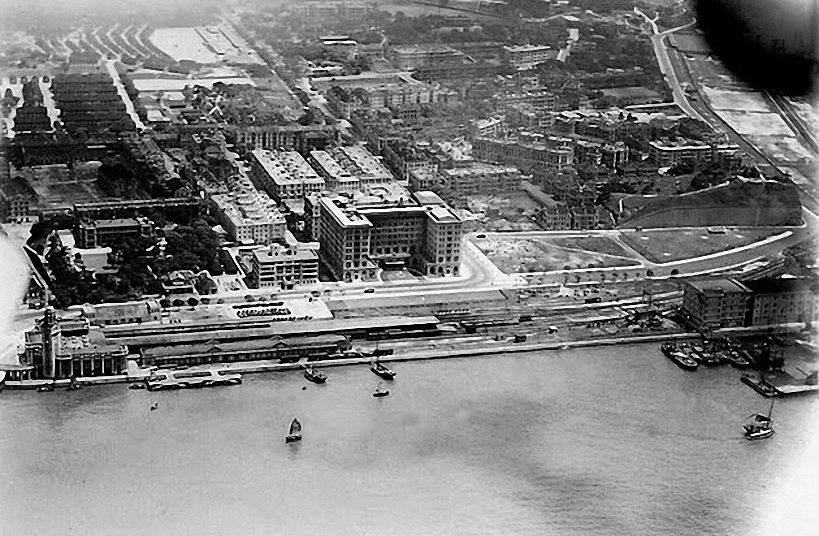
Aerial view of Tsim Sha Tsui in the 1930s. Whitfield Barracks are visible in the top left area.

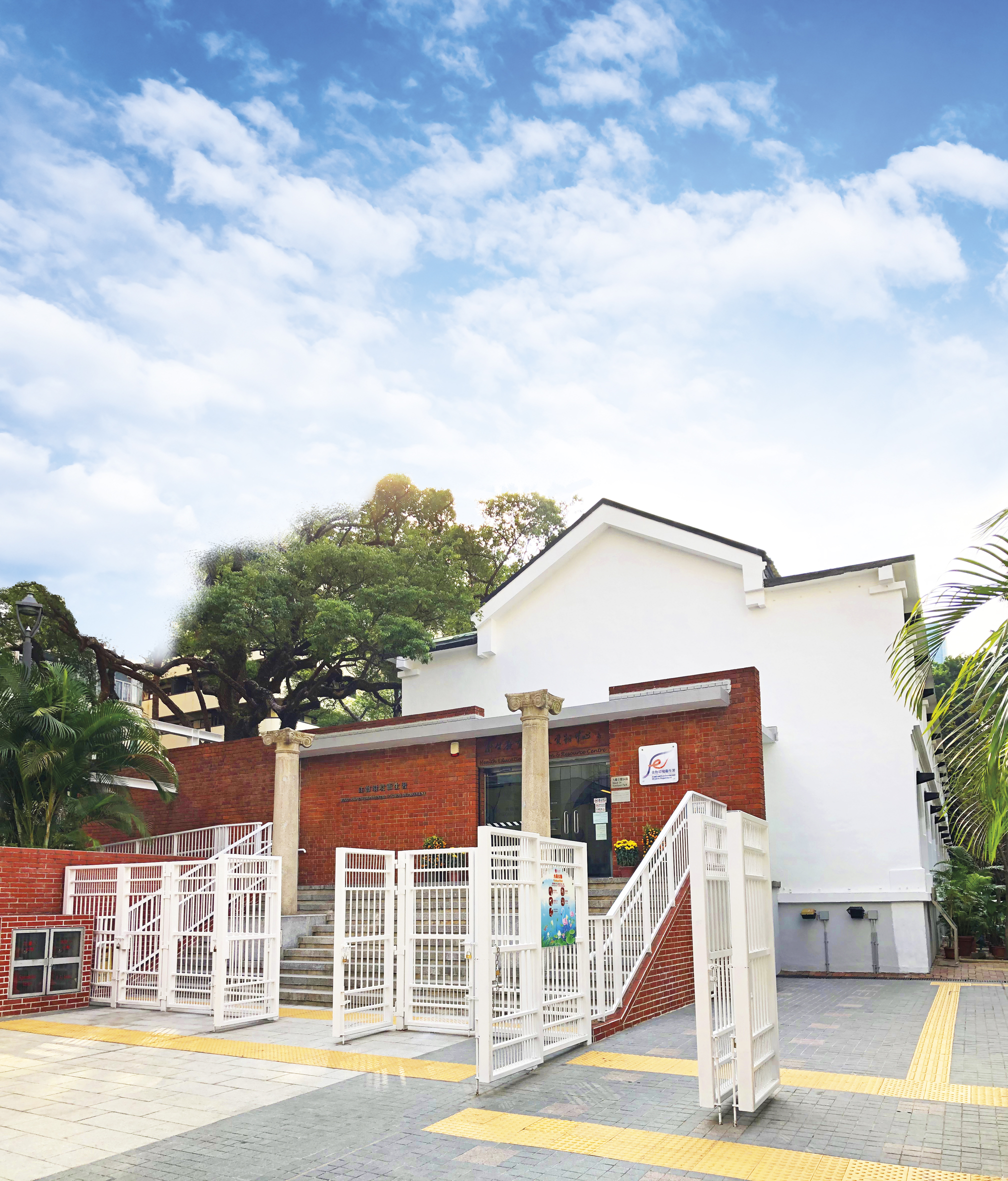
Health Education Exhibition and Resources Centre, former Block S4. Nathan Road entrance.

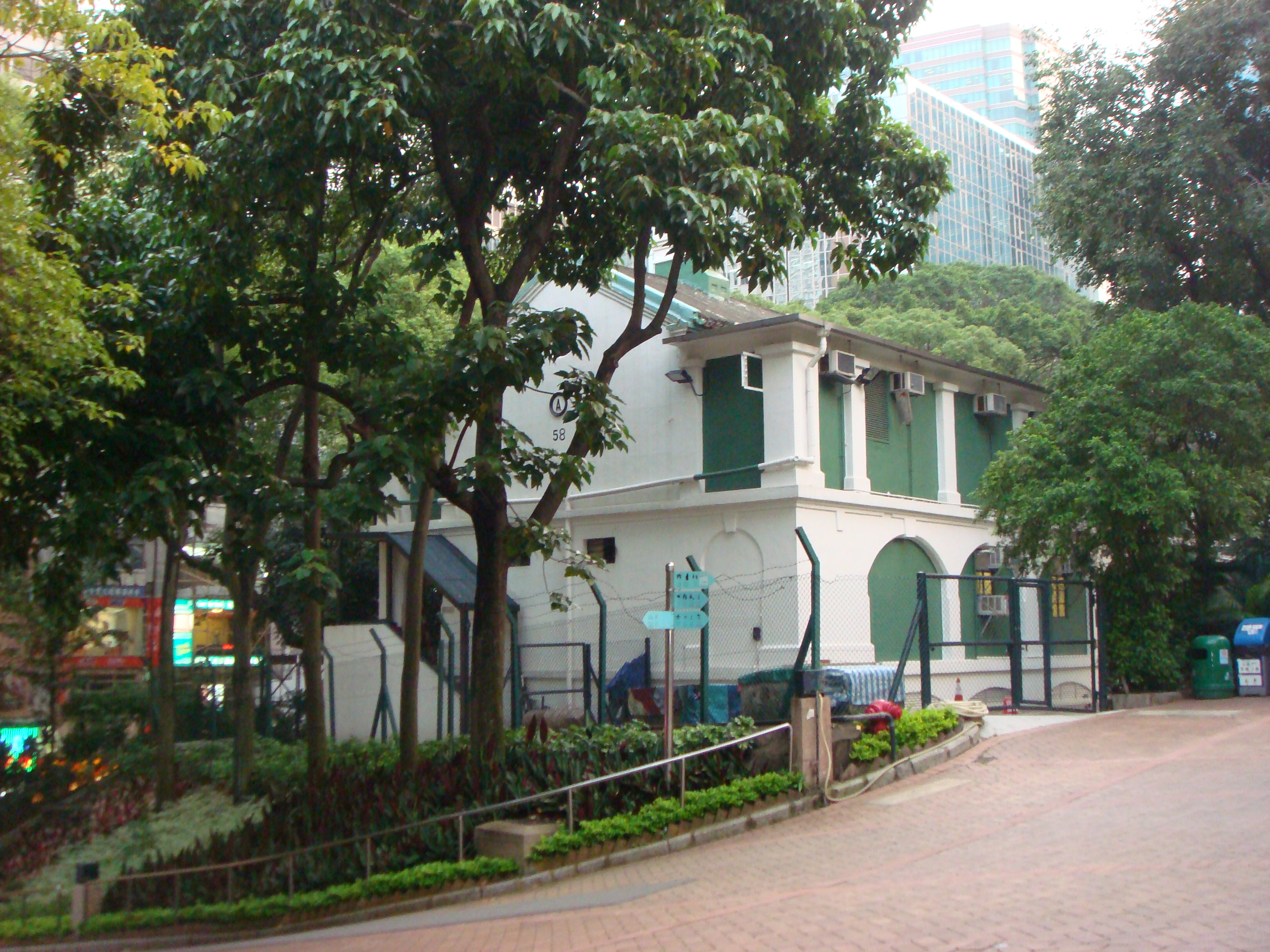
Former Block 58

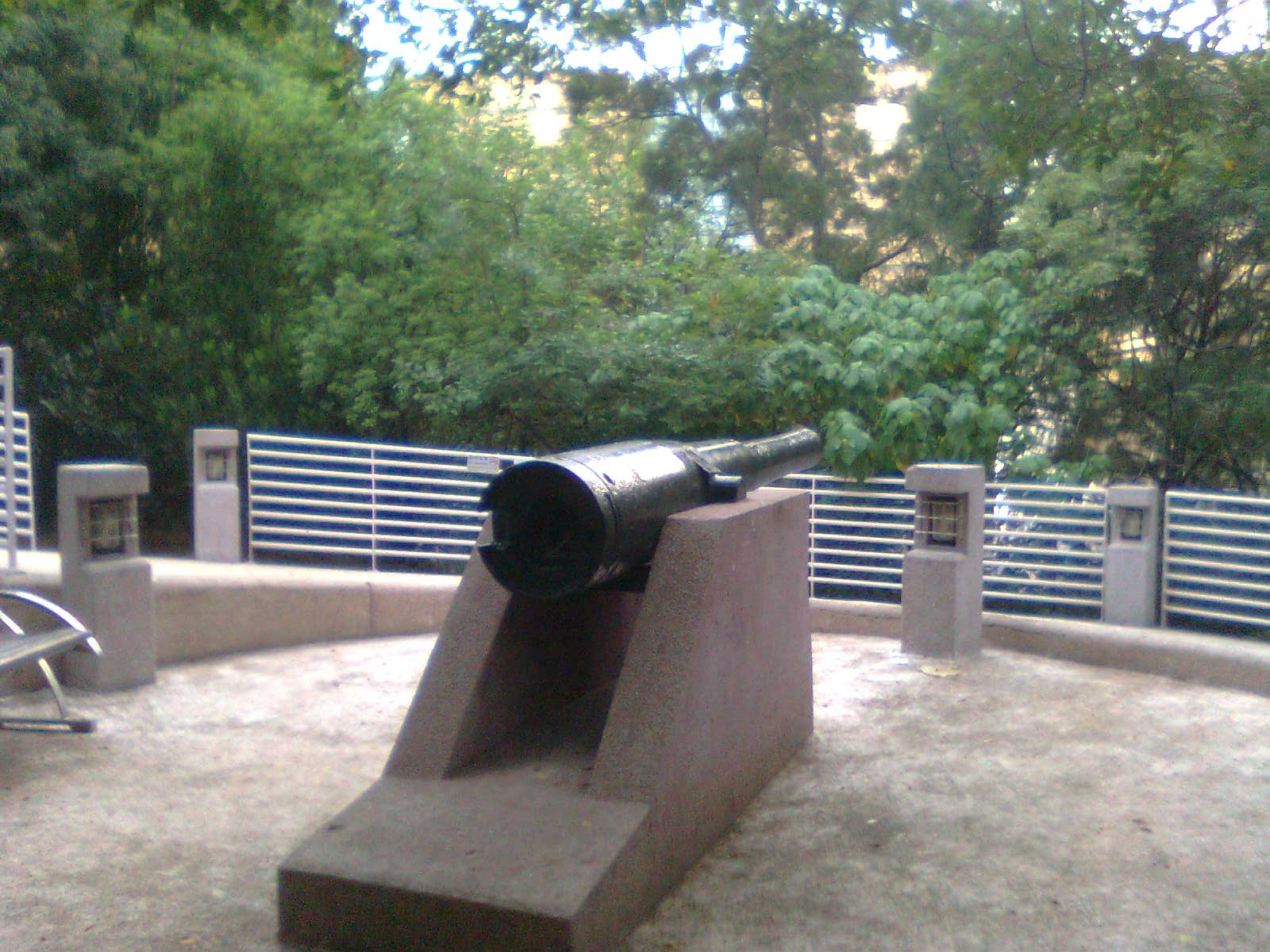
Kowloon West II Battery

Whitfield Barracks were barracks in Tsim Sha Tsui, Kowloon, Hong Kong. It was named after Henry Wase Whitfield, who was appointed commander of the British Army in Hong Kong in 1869. The area is now the site of Kowloon Park, where four reconverted barrack blocks and parts of the former Kowloon West II Battery remain.

== History ==
The site was designated a military area in 1864. In the 1890s, the barracks were first built for the British Indian garrisons. Twenty-five barrack blocks were built by 1906; the barracks were developed in subsequent years. By 1910, there had been 85 barrack buildings constructed. A mosque was also built at the southeastern corner of the site for worship by the garrison.

It belonged to the British Military Force when Hong Kong was under British rule. The premises was later returned to the Government of Hong Kong in 1967. In 1970, the Urban Council redeveloped the site into the Kowloon Park.

The Government was criticised when the Executive Council approved plans in 1982 for a strip of retail premises fronting Nathan Road to be carved into the hill of Kowloon Park. The move was first proposed when the barracks were converted into public open space in 1970, and ignited some controversy. It was opposed by the Urban Council, as well as the Muslim community, whose mosque was close by. The rights for the development of the 5,410 sq metre strip were sold in February 1983 to a subsidiary of New World Development for $218 million.

== Remaining buildings ==
Four reconverted military barrack blocks remain: Blocks 58, S4, S61 and S62.

Blocks S61 and S62 were constructed in circa 1910. They are a pair of identical two storied colonial military barrack blocks, and were originally part of six barrack blocks built parallel to one another. The roofs are pitched with Chinese tiles with tar finish. They housed the former Hong Kong Museum of History from 1983 to 1998 before the completion of the present Museum at Chatham Road South. An extension block linking the two historical barracks was constructed in the 1980s to provide more space for the museum facilities. The blocks now house the Hong Kong Heritage Discovery Centre.

Block S4 (formerly Block G) is situated at the southeast corner of Kowloon Park, along Haiphong Road, and is accessed through its entrance on Nathan Road. It is a two-storied colonial military barrack building which is similar in type to Blocks S61 and S62. It now houses Health Education Exhibition and Resource Centre.

Block 58 (formerly Block A) is situated at the southwest corner of Kowloon Park, along Haiphong Road. It is used as a godown of the Hong Kong Museum of History.

== Kowloon West II Battery ==
Kowloon West II Battery was situated in the northwestern part of today's Kowloon Park. It was built between 1878 and 1880, and was probably decommissioned by 1916. It commanded the entrance to Victoria Harbour between Stonecutters Island and Green Island. When Whitfield Barracks was converted into Kowloon Park, the battery was converted into a children's adventure playground; it is still recognisable for what it was, however. The gun emplacements have been renovated. Naval guns have been mounted in each emplacement after they were discovered at a construction site at Chatham Road in Tsim Sha Tsui in 1980.

== Conservation ==
The remaining Blocks 58, S4, S61 and S62 of the former barracks were listed as Grade III historic buildings from 1997 to 2009. They have been listed as Grade I historic buildings since 2009. The Kowloon West II Battery has been listed as a Grade I historic building since 1997.

The conversion of Blocks S61 and S62 into the Hong Kong Heritage Discovery Centre won the 2007 UNESCO Asia Pacific Heritage Awards Jury Commendation for Innovation.

== See also ==
- British Forces Overseas Hong Kong
- Victoria Barracks were located at the site of the current Hong Kong Park
- List of army barracks in Hong Kong
