= Henry Wase Whitfield =

British Army general

Lieutenant-General Henry Wase Whitfield
- Born: 1814
- Died: 30 March 1877 (aged 62–63); Dover, Kent
- Military career
- Allegiance: United Kingdom
- Branch: British Army
- Rank: Lieutenant-General
- Commands: Commander of British Troops in China, Hong Kong and the Straits Settlements

Lieutenant-General Henry Wase Whitfield (Chinese: 威非路) was the Lieutenant Governor of Hong Kong and Commander of British Troops in China, Hong Kong and the Straits Settlements.

== Military career ==
Whitfield was commissioned into the 2nd West India Regiment in 1828. He went on to be commanding officer of his regiment in 1843 and commanded it for 15 years.

He was promoted to major-general in 1868 and appointed Commander of British Troops in China, Hong Kong and the Straits Settlements in 1869.

== Memory ==
Whitfield Road (威非路道) in North Point and Whitfield Barracks in Tsim Sha Tsui, both in Hong Kong, were named after him.

Military offices
Preceded by James Brunker	Commander of British Troops in China, Hong Kong and the Straits Settlements; 1869–1874	Succeeded by Sir Francis Colborne
Government offices
Preceded by Sir Richard Graves MacDonnell	Administrator of Hong Kong; April 1872	Succeeded by Sir Arthur Edward Kennedy
