= Kowloon Park =

Park in Tsim Sha Tsui, Hong Kong

Coordinates: 22.30143°N 114.16986°E

- 九龍公園
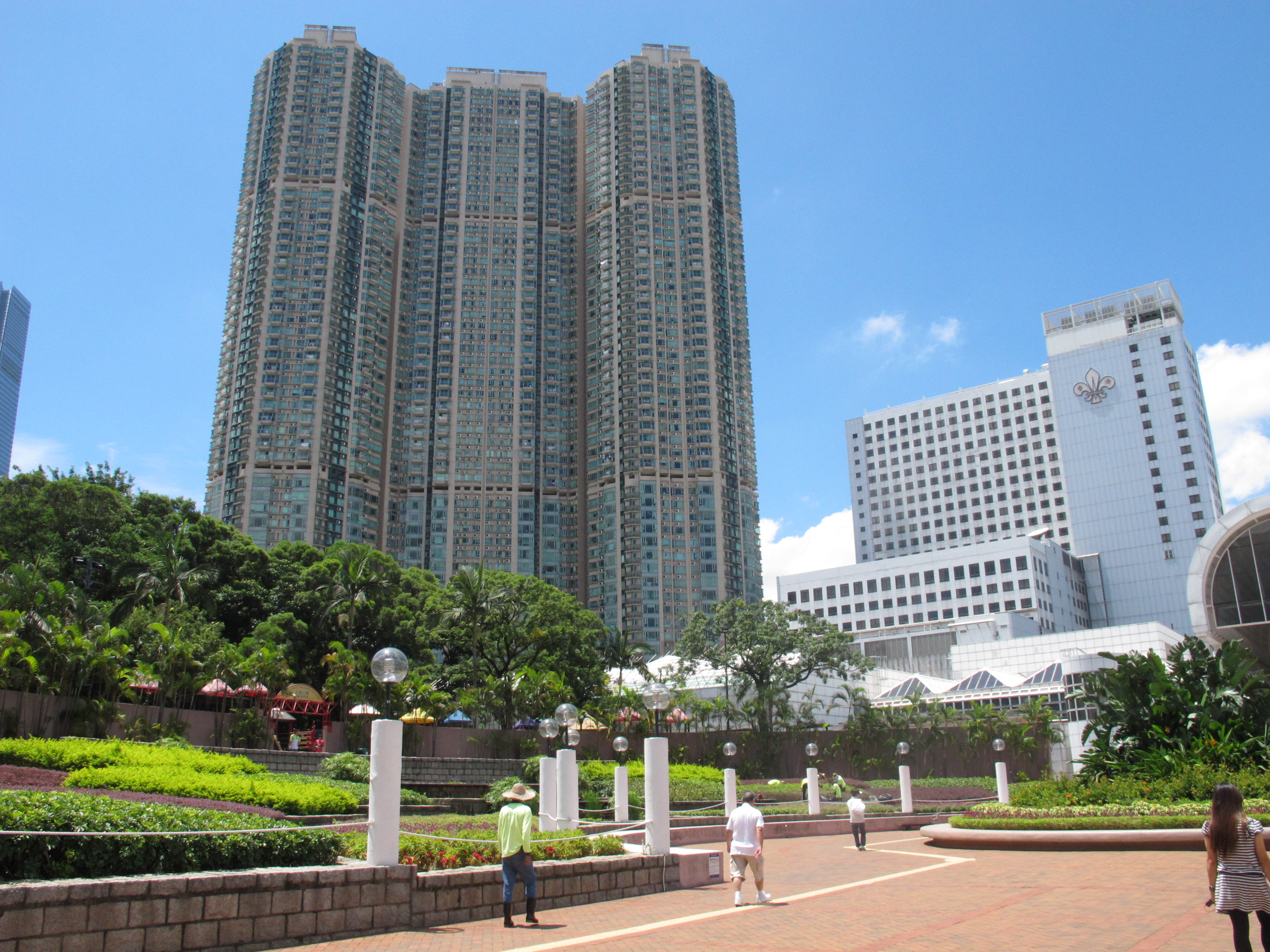
- View of the park
- Location: Tsim Sha Tsui, Kowloon
- Area: 13.3 hectares (33 acres)
- Opened: 24 June 1970; 56 years ago
- Operator: Leisure and Cultural Services Department
- Open: Year round
- Public transit: Tsim Sha Tsui station (10 m); Jordan station (180 m); Austin station (275 m); Star Ferry Pier (0.6 km)

Kowloon Park
- Traditional Chinese: 九龍公園
- Simplified Chinese: 九龙公园
Transcriptions
Standard Mandarin
- Hanyu Pinyin: Jiǔlóng Gōngyuán
Yue: Cantonese
- Jyutping: Gau2 lung4 gung1 jyun4*2

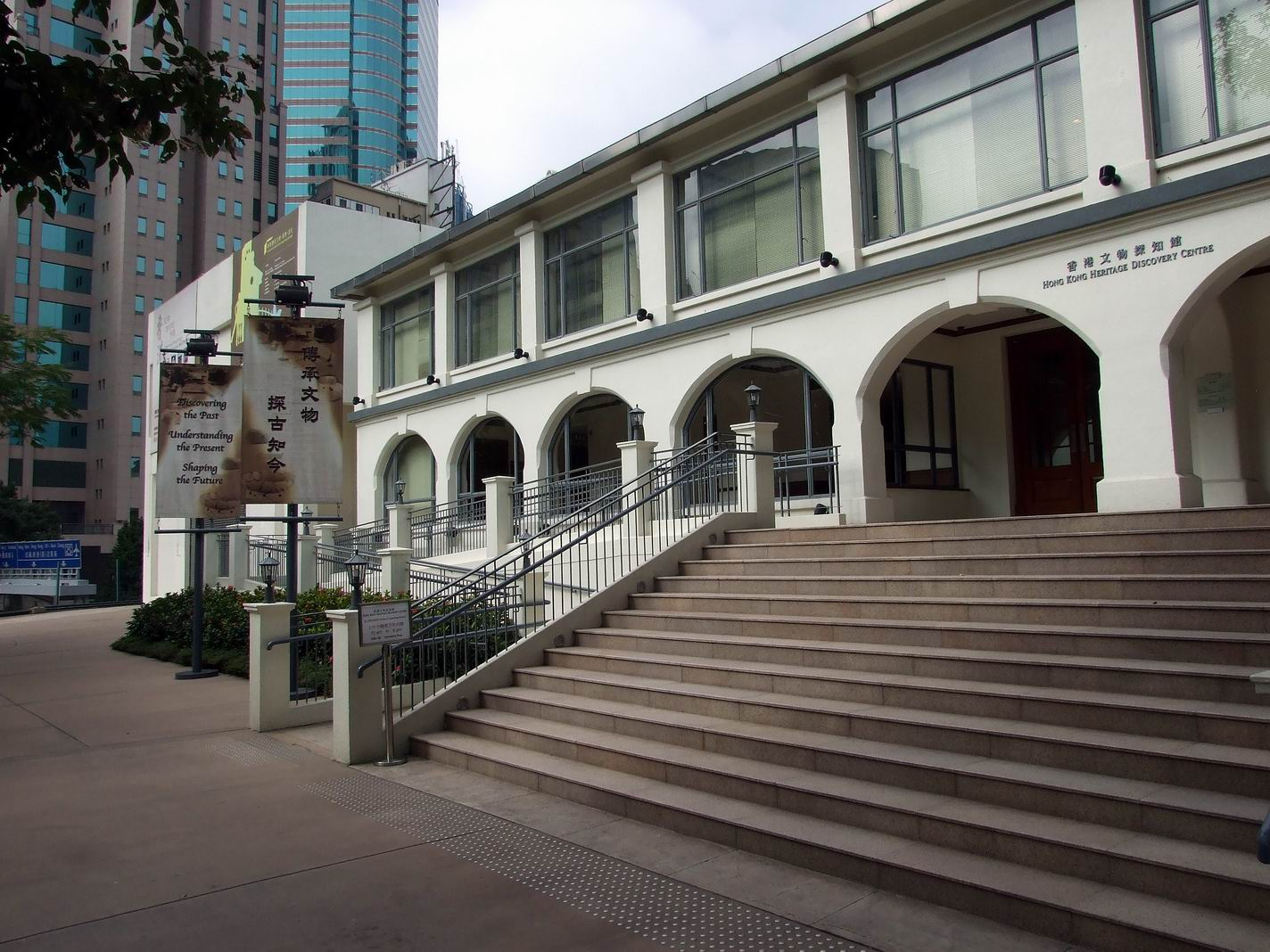
Blocks S61 and S62 of the former Whitfield Barracks now host the Hong Kong Heritage Discovery Centre.

Kowloon Park is a large public park in Tsim Sha Tsui, Kowloon, Hong Kong. It has an area of 13.3 hectares (33 acres) and is managed by the Leisure and Cultural Services Department.

== History ==
The park was formerly the site of the Whitfield Barracks of the British Army, with a former battery (Kowloon West II Battery) in the northwestern part of the park.

The Urban Council redeveloped the site into Kowloon Park in 1970. More than 70 buildings were demolished to make way for the park. The first stage of the park was officially opened on 24 June 1970 by the then governor of Hong Kong, Sir David Trench. The opening was celebrated by a lion dance as well as a folk dance by students of the Tai Hang Tung Primary School PM Session. Music was provided by the band of the First Battalion, the Royal Welsh Fusiliers. Sir David unveiled a commemorative plaque and declared Kowloon Park open. The first phase comprised 18 acres out of a planned 26 acres. It featured a floral clock as well as a Chinese garden set within an English landscape, which a government spokesman called "a reminder of Hongkong's cosmopolitan cultural heritage."

However, part of the site was occupied in the construction of an MTR rapid transit line—originally the Kwun Tong line, now the Tsuen Wan line—from 1975 to 1978, and this was cited as a reason for the slow progress in developing the remaining three stages of the park for recreational use. The Urban Council also placed some of the blame on the construction of Kowloon Park Drive, which cut through a corner of the park at the insistence of the government.

The Government was criticised when the Executive Council approved plans in 1982 for a strip of retail premises fronting Nathan Road to be carved into the hill of Kowloon Park. The move was first proposed when the Barracks were converted into public open space in 1970, and ignited some controversy. It was opposed by the Urban Council, as well as the Muslim community, whose mosque was close by. The rights for the development of the 5,410 square metre strip were sold in February 1983 to a subsidiary of New World Development for $218 million. The commercial development is called "Park Lane Shopper's Boulevard". Owing to the grade change, the roofs of the shops are level with the ground of Kowloon Park, and so the gardens extend onto the building rooftops.

An aviary was opened in 1980. From 1987 to 1989, the park was completed at a cost of $300 million, which was funded by the then Royal Hong Kong Jockey Club. The park was "doubled" in size, expanding to the north and south, and the sports centre and swimming pool complex was built.

== Facilities ==
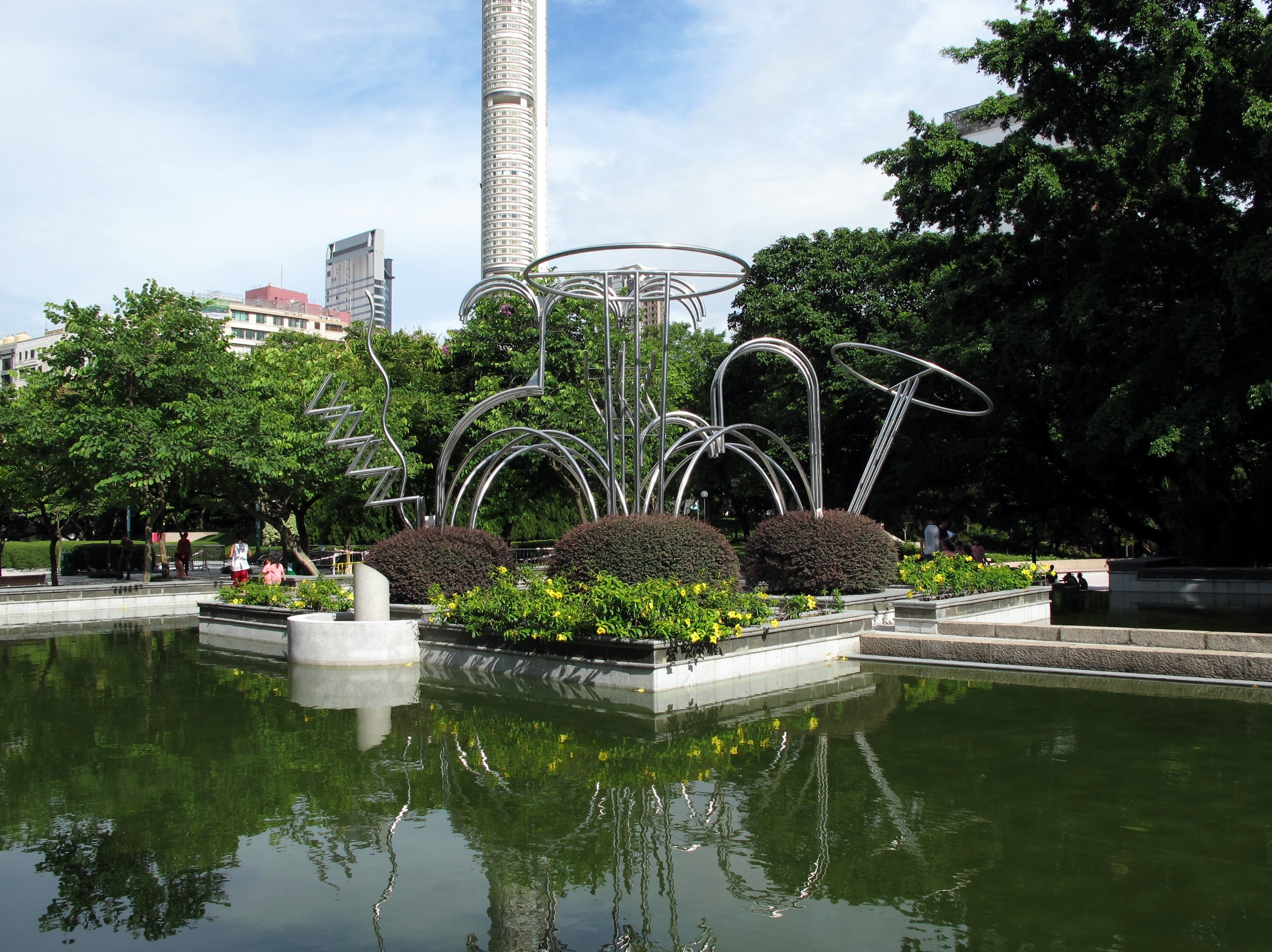
Pool Pavilion

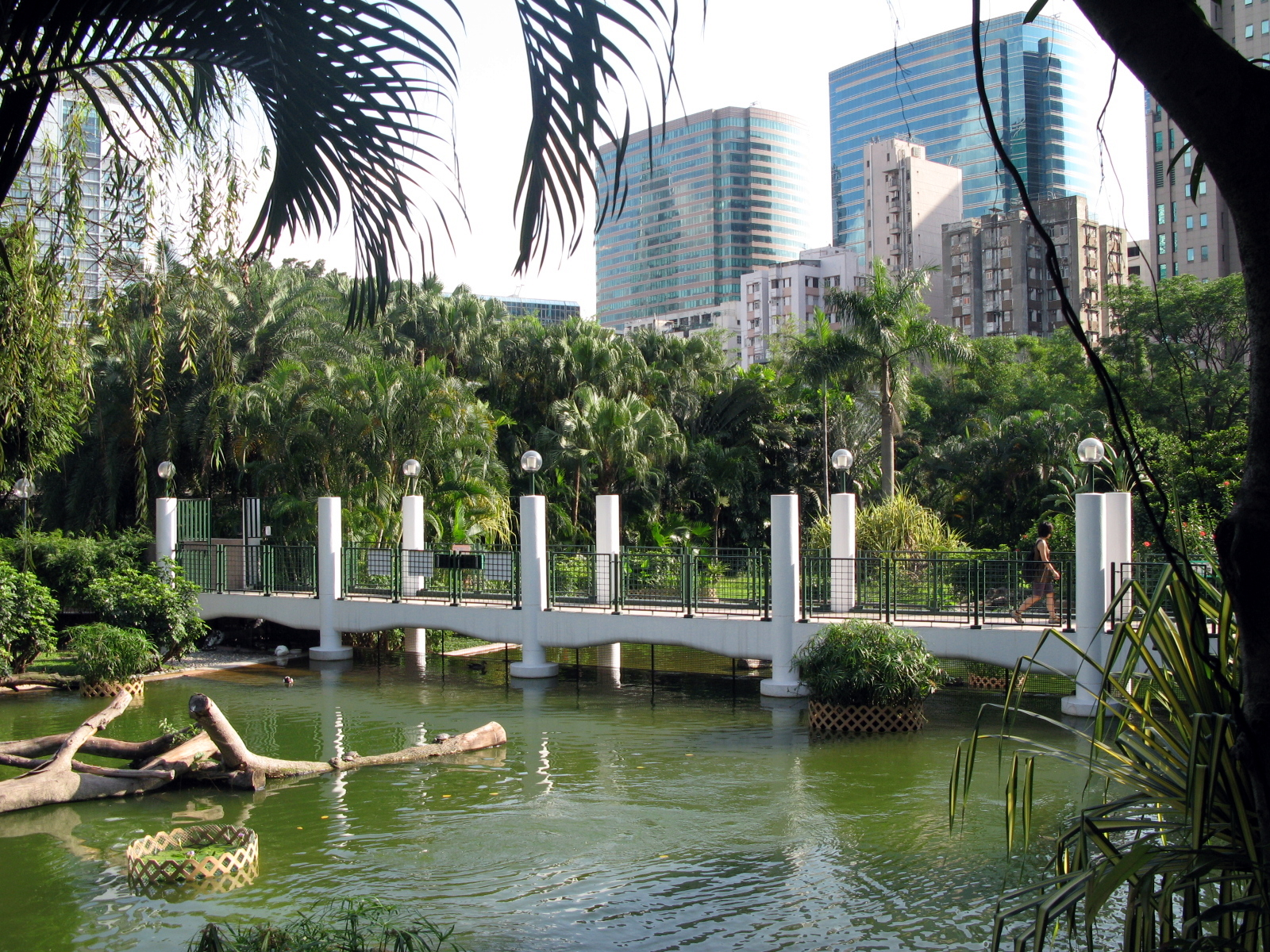
Bird Lake

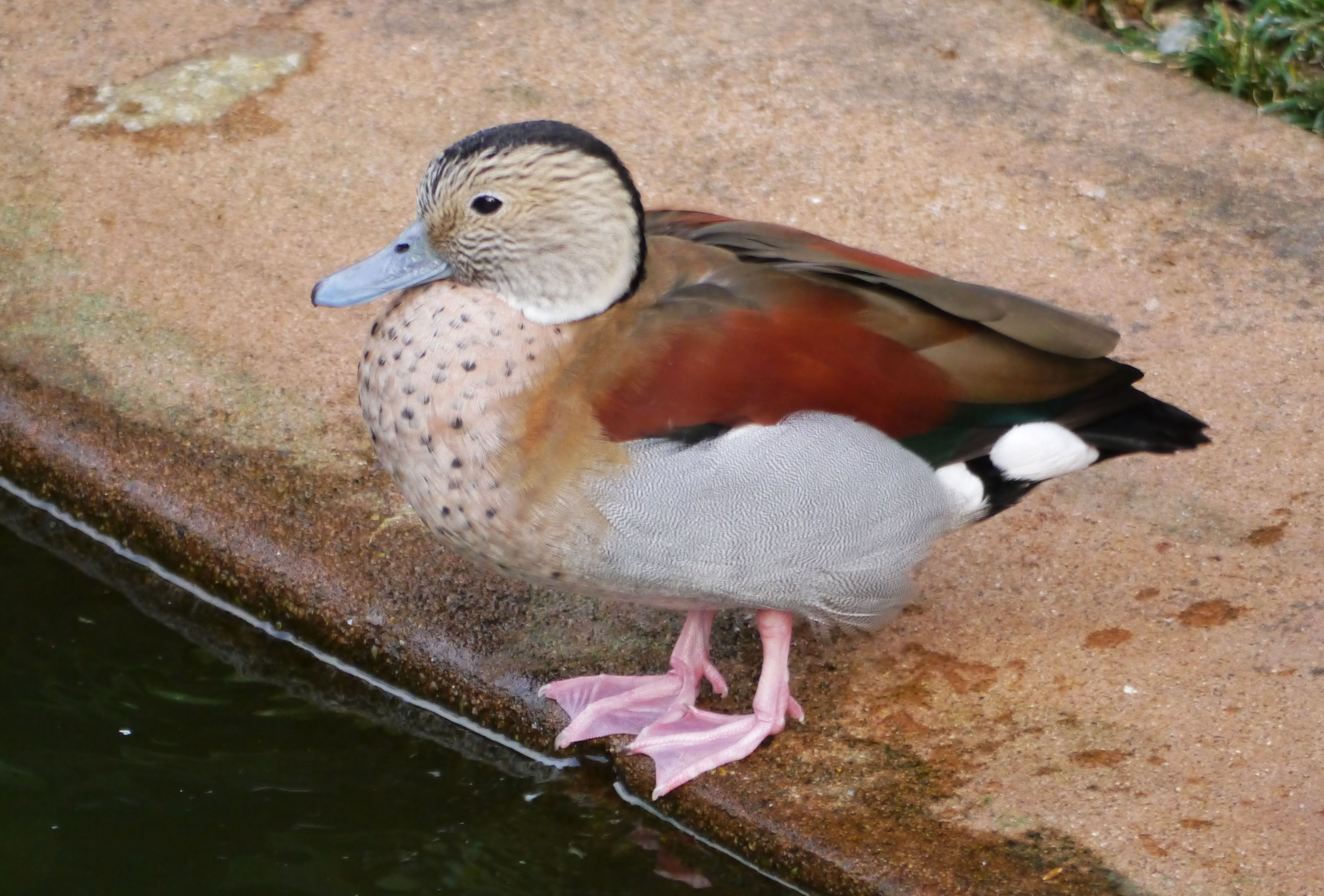
This ringed teal is among the numerous birds species in the park including swans, ducks, flamingoes, parrots and tropical pigeons.

=== Flora and gardens ===
There is a tree walk located next to the Rose Garden. There are also some stone wall trees growing on the walls adjacent to aviary pond in Kowloon Park.

=== Museums ===
One preserved historic barrack, Block S58, is used as a godown of Hong Kong Museum of History. Three other preserved buildings of the former barracks are used as museums:

==== Hong Kong Heritage Discovery Centre ====
Blocks S61 and S62 of former Whitfield Camp are "Grade III historical buildings" which were constructed in circa 1910. They are a pair of identical two storied colonial military barrack blocks. The roofs are pitched with Chinese tiles with tar finish. They housed the former Hong Kong Museum of History from 1983 to 1998 before the completion of the present Hong Kong Museum of History at Chatham Road South. An extension block linking the two historical barracks was constructed in the 1980s to provide more space for the museum facilities. It now houses the Hong Kong Heritage Discovery Centre.

==== Health Education Exhibition and Resource Centre ====
Block S4 of former Whitfield Camp is a two-storied colonial military barrack building which is identical to Blocks S61 and S62. It now houses the Health Education Exhibition and Resource Centre.

=== Avenue of Comic Stars ===
Located near the park's Park Lane Shopper's Boulevard entrance, the Hong Kong Avenue of Comic Stars opened in 2012. It features 24 figurines of local comic characters and 10 bronze handprints of local comic artists along a 100-metre path.

=== Bird Lake and the Aviary ===
Apart from the birds in the Bird Lake and the Aviary, about 100 different wild bird species can be found in the Park. The Conservation Corner, Color Garden, Chinese Garden, Bird Lake and Fitness Trail are ideal spots for wild bird watching.

=== Sporting facilities ===
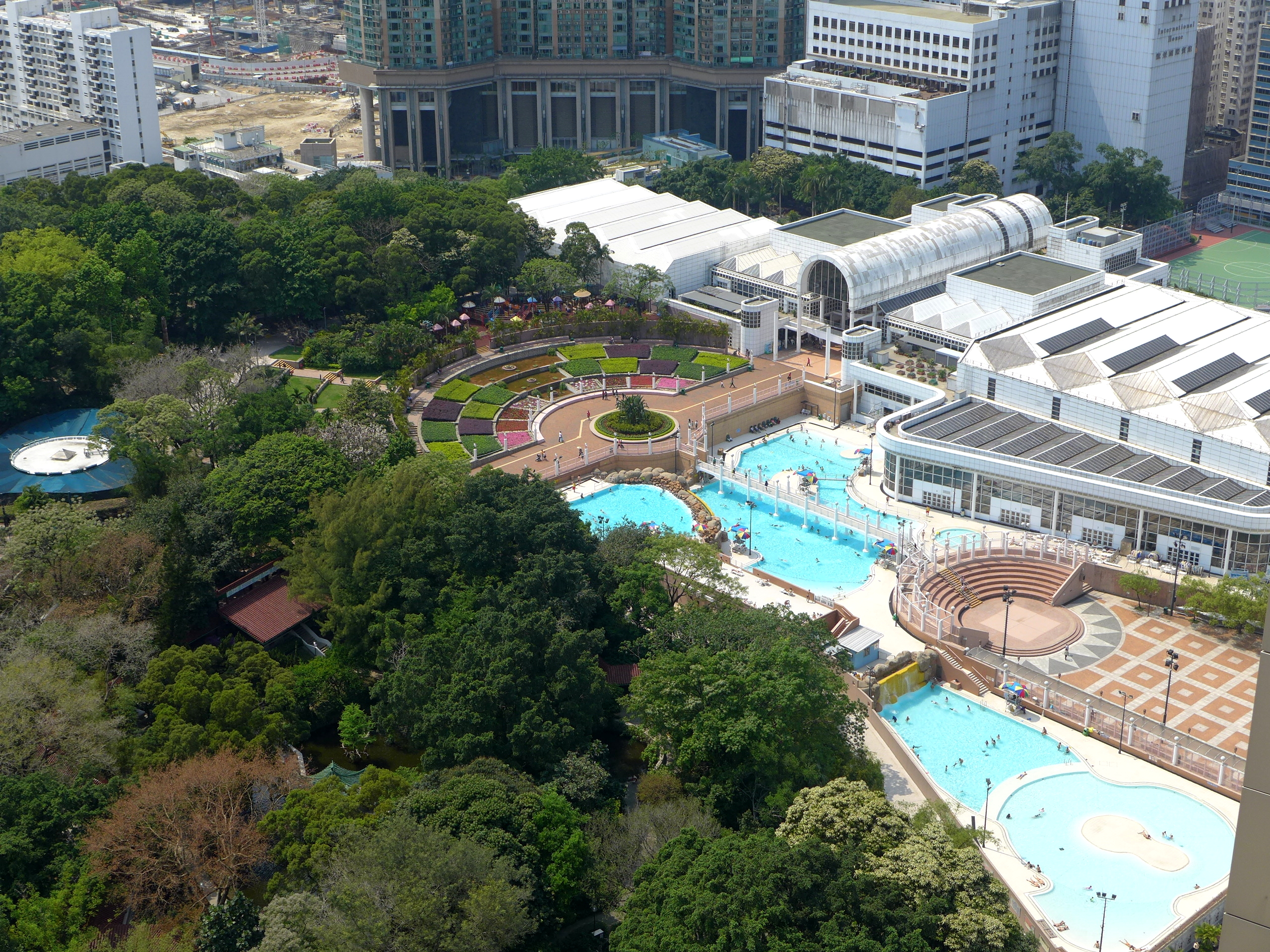
Kowloon Park Swimming Pool

The park houses an indoor sports centre and a large aquatics centre.

The pool complex is the most heavily used in Hong Kong, serving over 2000 swimmers daily. It includes four indoor heated pools, including an Olympic sized 50-metre main pool, two 25-metre training pools, and a 20-metre diving pool. Outdoors, there are leisure pools of irregular shapes linked together by waterfalls, a circular paddling pool, and sunbathing areas. The swimming complex opened on 12 September 1989 and can accommodate a maximum of 1530 swimmers, and has an annual attendance of more than 1 million visitors.

As one of the best equipped swimming pools in Hong Kong, it is the only venue on the Kowloon side suitable for staging major or international swimming events. Events of the Hong Kong Games are also held there regularly.

=== Other facilities ===
The former Kowloon West II Battery, which was graded as Grade I historic building, was converted into a children's adventure playground in Kowloon Park; it is still recognisable for what it was, however. The gun emplacements have been renovated. Naval guns have been mounted in each emplacement after they were discovered at a construction site at Chatham Road in Tsim Sha Tsui in 1980.

== See also ==
- List of urban public parks and gardens in Hong Kong
