= William Gustavus Brown =

General William Gustavus Brown
- Born: 3 February 1809; Kingston, Jamaica
- Died: 27 November 1883 (aged 74); Sydenham, Kent, England
- Military career
- Allegiance: United Kingdom
- Branch: British Army
- Rank: General
- Commands: Commander of British Troops in China and Hong Kong

General William Gustavus Brown (3 February 1809 – 27 November 1883) was Commander of British Troops in China and Hong Kong.

== Family ==
Brown was born in Kingston, Jamaica, to Janette Smellie (who was listed as a free woman of colour on his baptism) and Major Gustav Heinrich Gottlieb Braun (Brown), a German-born officer in the King's Royal Rifle Corps.

== Military career ==
Brown was commissioned into the 24th Regiment of Foot. Having served as a brigadier-general at Aldershot, he was promoted to major-general and made commander of British Troops in China and Hong Kong in 1863. During his term in command he put down a disturbance at Taitsan; allegations were made at the time about cruelty by British troops but were subsequently dismissed as groundless.

He was also colonel of the 83rd (County of Dublin) Regiment of Foot.

In retirement, he lived in Sydenham in Kent.

Military offices
Preceded by Charles Staveley	Commander of British Troops in China and Hong Kong; 1863–1864	Succeeded by Sir Philip Guy
