= John Neptune Sargent =

British Army general (1826–1893)

Lieutenant-General John Neptune Sargent CB
- Born: 18 June 1826
- Died: 20 October 1893 (aged 67); Bexley, London
- Military career
- Allegiance: United Kingdom
- Branch: British Army
- Rank: Lieutenant-General
- Commands: 2nd Battalion Buffs; 1st Battalion Buffs; Inns of Court Volunteers; Brigade Depot at Milford Haven; Military Depot in Oxford; Commander of British Troops in China, Hong Kong and the Straits Settlements
- Conflicts: Crimean War; Second Opium War
- Awards: Companion of the Order of the Bath

Lieutenant-General John Neptune Sargent CB (18 June 1826 – 20 October 1893) was Commander of British Troops in China, Hong Kong and the Straits Settlements.

== Military career ==
Sargent was commissioned into the 95th Regiment of Foot in 1844. In 1847, he went to Canton to protect the local factories from violence. He was appointed adjutant of his regiment in 1851. He fought in the Crimean War at the Battle of Alma and was wounded; he also fought at the Battle of Inkerman and the Siege of Sevastopol of 1855 where he was again wounded. He also took part in the Second Opium War in 1860, leading a detachment during the storming of the north Taku Forts.

He was made commanding officer of the 2nd battalion of the Buffs at Malta in 1861 and then of the 1st battalion in England in 1862. In 1864 he took command of the Inns of Court Volunteers, in 1873 he became commander of a brigade depot at Milford Haven, and in 1874 he became commander of a military depot in Oxford.

He was appointed Commander of British Troops in China, Hong Kong and the Straits Settlements in 1882, and retired in 1890.

He was also colonel of the 1st Battalion of the Royal Inniskilling Fusiliers from 1891 to his death in 1893.

He lived at Mount Mascal near Bexley in London.

== Family ==
In 1852, Sargent married Miss R. S. Champion. In 1863, he married Alice Mary Tredwell, daughter of Thomas Tredwell.

Military offices
Preceded by Edward Donovan	Commander of British Troops in China, Hong Kong and the Straits Settlements; 1882–1885	Succeeded by Sir William Cameron
Preceded by Randal Rumley	colonel of the 1st Battalion, Royal Inniskilling Fusiliers; 1891–1893	Succeeded by William Roberts
