= William Jervois (British Army officer) =

British Army officer (1782–1862)

General William Jervois KH
- Born: 1782
- Died: 5 November 1862 (aged 79–80)
- Military career
- Allegiance: United Kingdom
- Branch: British Army
- Rank: General
- Commands: Commander and Lieutenant Governor of Hong Kong
- Conflicts: Peninsular War
- Awards: Knight of the Royal Guelphic Order

General William Jervois KH (1782 – 5 November 1862) was Commander and Lieutenant Governor of Hong Kong. Jervois Street in Hong Kong was named after him.

== Military career ==
Jervois served in the Peninsular War and, having been promoted to Lieutenant General in 1846, went on to be Commander and Lieutenant Governor of Hong Kong in 1851.

He was also colonel of the 76th Regiment of Foot. He was promoted general on 3 August 1860.

== Family ==
He married Elizabeth Maitland and had at least one son, Sir William Jervois.

Military offices
Preceded by William Staveley	Commander and Lieutenant Governor of Hong Kong; 1851–1854	Succeeded by Sir Robert Garrett
Preceded by Sir Robert Arbuthnot	Colonel of 76th Regiment of Foot; 1853–1862	Succeeded by Joseph Clarke
