= Wilsone Black =

British military officer and colonial administrator (1837-1909)

Major-General Sir Wilsone Black KCB
- Born: 10 February 1837; Glasgow, Scotland
- Died: 5 July 1909 (aged 72)
- Military career
- Allegiance: United Kingdom
- Branch: British Army
- Rank: Major-General
- Commands: South Wales Borderers; Commander of British Troops in China and Hong Kong
- Conflicts: Crimean War; 9th Xhosa War; Anglo-Zulu War
- Awards: Knight Commander of the Order of the Bath

Major-General Sir Wilsone Black KCB (10 February 1837 – 5 July 1909) was a British military officer and colonial administrator.

== Military career ==
Black was commissioned into the 42nd Regiment of Foot in 1854. He served in the Crimea War from 1855 and was present at the Siege of Sebastopol. He was appointed a Brigade Major in Nova Scotia in 1867.

He transferred to the 6th Regiment of Foot in 1873 and to the 24th Regiment of Foot in 1875. He served in the 9th Xhosa War in 1877. He also served in the Anglo-Zulu War and was mentioned in despatches in 1879. He recovered the Queen's Colour of the 1st Bn of the 24th Regiment which had been lost in the Buffalo River after the Battle of Isandlwana.

He went on to be commanding officer of the South Wales Borderers in 1880, assistant adjutant and quartermaster general in Nova Scotia in 1882, assistant adjutant general in Gibraltar in 1887, commander of the troops in Jamaica in 1891 and commander in Belfast in 1893.

He became Commander of British Troops in China and Hong Kong in 1895 and was acting administrator in Hong Kong for a short period between February and November 1898.

He retired in 1899.

== Family ==
In 1869 he married Florence Maud Ross; they had one daughter.

== Memory ==
Wilsone Black's life is commemorated on a memorial tablet in Brecon Cathedral.

Black Hill and Black's Link in Hong Kong were named after him.

Military offices
Preceded by Sir George Barker	Commander of British Troops in China and Hong Kong; 1895–1898	Succeeded by Sir William Gascoigne
Government offices
Preceded by Sir William Robinson	Administrator of Hong Kong; 1 February 1898 – 25 November 1898	Succeeded by Henry Arthur Blake
