= Edward Westby Donovan =

British Army general (1821–1897)

General Edward Westby Donovan
- Born: 6 September 1821
- Died: 1897 (aged 76)
- Military career
- Allegiance: United Kingdom
- Branch: British Army
- Rank: General
- Commands: Commander of British Troops in China, Hong Kong and the Straits Settlements
- Conflicts: Crimean War
- Awards: Knight of the Légion d'honneur

General Edward Westby Donovan (6 September 1821 – 1897) was Commander of British Troops in China, Hong Kong and the Straits Settlements.

== Military career ==
Donovan was commissioned into the 33rd Regiment of Foot in 1840. He fought in the Crimean War and was severely wounded at the Siege of Sevastopol in 1855. For this he was made a Chevalier (Knight) of the Légion d'honneur.

In 1878 he was appointed Commander of British Troops in China, Hong Kong and the Straits Settlements, a post he held until 1882. He retired in 1887 with the honorary rank of full general.

Following, he was made Colonel of the East Yorkshire Regiment (1891—1897).

== Family ==
Edward Westby Donovan belonged to the distinguished Ballymore sept of the O'Donovans of Clanloughlin.

Military offices
| Preceded by Sir Francis Colborne | Commander of British Troops in China, Hong Kong and the Straits Settlements; 1878–1882 | Succeeded by John Sargent |
| Preceded by Robert Bruce | Colonel of The East Yorkshire Regiment; 1891–1897 | Succeeded by William Hardy |
