= Thomas Ashburnham (British Army officer, born 1808) =

British Army general

General Thomas Ashburnham CB
- Born: 1808; Barking, Suffolk
- Died: 2 March 1872 (aged 64); Park Street, Mayfair, London
- Military career
- Allegiance: United Kingdom
- Branch: British Army
- Rank: General
- Commands: Commander of British Troops in China and Hong Kong
- Conflicts: First Anglo-Sikh War
- Awards: Companion of the Order of the Bath

General Thomas Ashburnham CB (1808 – 2 March 1872) was Commander of British Troops in China and Hong Kong.

== Military career ==
Born the son of the 3rd Earl of Ashburnham, Thomas Ashburnham became a Coldstream Guards officer. He went on to serve in India during the First Anglo-Sikh War between 1845 and 1846.

He was appointed Commander of British Troops in China and Hong Kong in 1857.

He was also Colonel of the 82nd Regiment of Foot from 1859 until his death.

In retirement he lived in Park Street in London and died in 1872.

== Family ==
In 1860, he married Adelaide Georgiana Frederica Foley, daughter of Thomas Foley, 3rd Baron Foley.

Military offices
Preceded by Sir Robert Garrett	Commander of British Troops in China and Hong Kong; 1857–1858	Succeeded by Sir Charles van Straubenzee
