= Francis Colborne =

British Army general

General Sir Francis Colborne KCB
- Born: 23 April 1817; Florence, Italy
- Died: 26 November 1895 (aged 78); Buckerell, Devon, England
- Military career
- Allegiance: United Kingdom
- Branch: British Army
- Rank: General
- Commands: Commander of British Troops in China, Hong Kong and the Straits Settlements
- Conflicts: Crimean War; Perak Expedition
- Awards: Knight Commander of the Order of the Bath

General Sir Francis Colborne KCB (23 April 1817 – 26 November 1895) was Commander of British Troops in China, Hong Kong and the Straits Settlements.

== Early years ==
Born in 1817 the second son of John Colborne, 1st Baron Seaton and educated at Elizabeth College, Guernsey, due to his father's posting between 1821 and 1828 as Lieutenant-Governor of Guernsey.

== Military career ==
Colborne was commissioned into the 15th Regiment of Foot in 1836. He served in the Crimean War in 1855.

He was appointed Commander of British Troops in China, Hong Kong and the Straits Settlements in 1874. He commanded the Perak Expedition in 1875 and quickly put down the insurrection taking place in North West Malaysia. He was made a full general on 1 April 1882 and retired in 1883.

In 1881 he was made Colonel of the First Battalion, Queen's Own Royal West Kent Regiment, a position he held until 1885, when he transferred to be Colonel of the Royal Warwickshire Regiment until his death in 1895.

== Sources ==
- Westlake, Ray (2010). Tracing the Rifle Volunteers: A Guide for Military and Family Historian. Pen & Sword. ISBN 978-1848842113.

Military offices
Preceded by Henry Whitfield	Commander of British Troops in China, Hong Kong and the Straits Settlements; 1874–1878	Succeeded by Edward Donovan
