= James Brunker (British Army officer) =

British Army general

Major-General James Brunker
- Born: 22 December 1806; Dublin, Ireland
- Died: 24 March 1869 (aged 62)
- Military career
- Allegiance: United Kingdom
- Branch: British Army
- Rank: Major-General
- Commands: Commander of British Troops in China and Hong Kong

Major-General James Robert Brunker (22 December 1806 – 24 March 1869) was Commander of British Troops in China and Hong Kong.

== Military career ==
Brunker was commissioned into the 91st Regiment of Foot in 1825. He was appointed adjutant of his regiment in 1829.

He went on to be deputy adjutant-general in Ceylon in 1852 before being appointed Inspecting Field Officer for the Recruiting District in 1860.

He was promoted to major-general in 1865 and then made Commander of British Troops in China and Hong Kong in 1867.

He died in Hong Kong in 1869 and is buried there.

== Family ==
On 9 August 1842 he married Marianne Molyneux, daughter of John Molyneux of Gravel Hill, Ludlow.

Military offices
Preceded by Sir Philip Guy	Commander of British Troops in China and Hong Kong; 1867–1869	Succeeded by Henry Whitfield
