= Philip Guy (British Army officer) =

Lieutenant-General Sir Philip Guy KCB
- Born: 1804; Sidmouth, Devon, England
- Died: 10 March 1878 (aged 73–74); Wiesbaden, Germany
- Military career
- Allegiance: United Kingdom
- Branch: British Army
- Rank: Lieutenant-General
- Commands: British Troops at Danapur; Commander of British Troops in China and Hong Kong; Lieutenant Governor of Jersey
- Conflicts: Siege of Lucknow
- Awards: Knight Commander of the Order of the Bath

Lieutenant-General Sir Philip Melmoth Nelson Guy KCB (1804–1878) was Commander of British Troops in China and Hong Kong and Lieutenant Governor of Jersey.

== Military career ==
Guy was commissioned into the 5th Regiment of Foot in 1824. He went on to command the British Troops at Danapur in India in 1857.

He was appointed Commander of British Troops in China and Hong Kong in 1864 and Lieutenant Governor of Jersey in 1868, a post he relinquished in 1873.

Military offices
Preceded by William Brown	Commander of British Troops in China and Hong Kong; 1864–1867	Succeeded by James Brunker
Government offices
Preceded by Sir Burke Cuppage	Lieutenant Governor of Jersey; 1868–1873	Succeeded by Sir William Norcott
