= John Plant Hoka =

Member of the Legislative Council
- In office 1967–1970
- Constituency: Central Solomons

John Plant Hoka was a Solomon Islands politician.

== Biography ==
Hoka worked as a schoolteacher on Guadalcanal until leaving his job to promote Maasina Ruru, an anti-British movement.

He was a candidate in the indirectly-elected Central Solomons seat in the 1965 election, losing to Lilly Ogatina. When the Legislative Council was expanded from one to fourteen directly elected seats in 1967, Hoka contested the Central Solomons constituency in the elections that year. He was elected to the council with 39% of the vote.

The Central Solomons constituency was abolished prior to the 1970 elections to the new Governing Council. Hoka ran in the new Ngella/Savo/Russells constituency, but finished fourth in a field of five candidates. He did not run for national office again.
