= Eric Lawson (politician) =

Australian businessman and politician

Eric Lawson OBE

Member of the Legislative Council of the Solomon Islands
- In office 1960–1967
- Governor: John Gutch; David Trench; Robert Sidney Foster
- Preceded by: new seat
- Succeeded by: Bill Ramsay
- Constituency: Honiara

Personal details
- Born: 1910
- Died: 1 July 1993 (aged 82–83)

Eric Vernon Lawson OBE (1910 – 1 July 1993), was an Australian businessman and politician in the Solomon Islands. The Lawson Tama Stadium in the capital Honiara is named after him.

== Biography ==
Lawson arrived in the British Solomon Islands in 1947 to manage the governmental Trade Scheme, later the British Solomons Trading Company. He went on to become manager of a copra plantation in the Russell Islands for the Fairymead Sugar Company, before starting his own company, E. V. Lawson Pty.

In 1948 he became a member of the Honiara Town Advisory Board, and later served as a member of the town council. In 1960 he became a member of the wholly appointed Legislative Council of the Solomon Islands, and the following year became Vice-President of the town council. In 1961 Lawson called a meeting at the Rove sports ground to discuss sporting facilities in the territory, which led to the establishment of the British Solomon Islands Amateur Sports Association, with Lawson as president. The government allowed the creation of the Town Sports Ground. Due to Lawson's heavy involvement in its establishment, it was later renamed the Lawson Tama Stadium.

Constitutional reforms in 1964 led to the creation of eight elected seats on the Legislative Council, but only the Honiara seat was directly elected, with the remainder elected by electoral colleges composed of local councillors. In the elections in April 1965 Lawson won the Honiara seat, becoming the first directly elected MP in the Solomon Islands. In June 1965 Lawson and North Malaita MP Mariano Kelesi established the Democratic Party in an attempt to gain support for forming a government. Kelesi became party president and Lawson was secretary. However, it ceased to exist when an executive was formed.

Lawson did not contest the 1967 elections to the Legislative Council, and left Honiara town council in 1969. He moved to Brisbane when he retired in 1974, at which point his company was taken over by C Sullivan Export. He was made an Officer of the Order of the British Empire (OBE) for "services to the community".
