= Solomons United National Party =

The Solomon United National Party (SUN) was a political party in the Solomon Islands.

== History ==
Following the 1967 elections, the party was established in 1968 by David Kausimae, Bill Ramsay and Frank Wickham. It was no more than a group of members of the Legislative Council and was primarily formed with the aim of lobbying the British authorities to introduce a cabinet system.

The party issued a manifesto in 1972, and was the only party to contest the 1973 elections. However, it won only one seat, and was reported to be defunct soon after the elections. Kausimae went on to found the Rural Alliance Party.
