= 1973 Solomon Islands general election =

General elections were held in the Solomon Islands between 22 May and 12 June 1973. The following year, Solomon Mamaloni of the People's Progressive Party became the first Chief Minister.

== Electoral system ==
The Governing Council was enlarged from 26 to 33 seats prior to the election. Of the 33 members, 24 were elected in single-member constituencies (increased from seventeen) and nine were appointed, including three ex officio members. The member representing Eastern Outer Island was elected directly for the first time, having previously been elected by an electoral college, although suffrage on the islands was limited to men by local chiefs.

== Campaign ==
A total of 118 candidates contested the 24 elected seats. Campaigning in Honiara was reported to be unusually bitter, with posters being torn down and several complaints made to the police. Only one political party, the Solomons United National Party of David Kausimae, contested the elections.

== Results ==
Only six of the MPs elected in 1970 were re-elected, and only one member of the Solomons United National Party. Voter turnout ranged from 42% in Honiara to 82%.

| Constituency | Candidate | Votes | % | Notes |
|---|---|---|---|---|
| ꞌAreꞌare | David Kausimae | 1,223 | 63.14 | Re-elected |
| ꞌAreꞌare | Peter Kenilorea | 714 | 36.86 | |
| ꞌAreꞌare | Total | 1,937 | 100 | |
| Central Guadalcanal | David Thuguvoda | 618 | 41.28 | Elected |
| Central Guadalcanal | Alfred Maeke | 507 | 33.87 | Unseated |
| Central Guadalcanal | Moses Albert Rere | 191 | 12.76 | |
| Central Guadalcanal | Allan Billy Masedi | 181 | 12.09 | |
| Central Guadalcanal | Total | 1,497 | 100 | |
| Central Malaita | Collin Gauwane | 567 | 37.80 | Elected |
| Central Malaita | George Maelalo | 243 | 16.20 | |
| Central Malaita | Lionel Oloni | 201 | 13.40 | |
| Central Malaita | Vincent Talauburi | 190 | 12.67 | |
| Central Malaita | Jazial Fono | 133 | 8.87 | |
| Central Malaita | Frank Lulu Bare | 89 | 5.93 | |
| Central Malaita | Timeous Teioli | 65 | 4.33 | |
| Central Malaita | Nelson Kifo | 12 | 0.80 | |
| Central Malaita | Total | 1,500 | 100 | |
| Choiseul | Gideon Zoleveke | 690 | 42.94 | Elected |
| Choiseul | Franklin Pitakaka | 318 | 19.79 | |
| Choiseul | Allan Qurusu | 263 | 16.37 | |
| Choiseul | Binet Gadebeta | 192 | 11.95 | |
| Choiseul | Benjamin Robinson | 81 | 5.04 | |
| Choiseul | Peter Qorovuku | 63 | 3.92 | |
| Choiseul | Total | 1,607 | 100 | |
| East Guadalcanal | Waeta Ben | 618 | 39.31 | Elected |
| East Guadalcanal | David Valusa | 216 | 13.74 | |
| East Guadalcanal | Joel Kikolo | 171 | 10.88 | |
| East Guadalcanal | James Bosa | 148 | 9.41 | |
| East Guadalcanal | Sukuatu Malakia | 113 | 7.19 | |
| East Guadalcanal | Donasiano Pororasu | 83 | 5.28 | |
| East Guadalcanal | Salathiel Lence Roger | 83 | 5.28 | |
| East Guadalcanal | Total | 1,572 | 100 | |
| East Isabel/Savo | Francis Reginald Kikolo | 628 | 33.65 | Elected |
| East Isabel/Savo | Daniel Denys Maile | 526 | 28.19 | |
| East Isabel/Savo | Wilson Sungi | 394 | 21.11 | |
| East Isabel/Savo | Alfred Charles Bugoro | 318 | 17.04 | |
| East Isabel/Savo | Total | 1,866 | 100 | |
| East Makira | Benedict Kinika | 1,034 | 61.84 | Elected |
| East Makira | Geoffrey Kuper | 638 | 38.16 | |
| East Makira | Total | 1,672 | 100 | |
| East Malaita | Leslie Fugui | 441 | 27.19 | Elected |
| East Malaita | Faneta Sira | 338 | 20.84 | |
| East Malaita | Billy Fa'arobo | 205 | 12.64 | |
| East Malaita | John Maetia Kaliuae | 188 | 11.59 | |
| East Malaita | Baddeley Koutu | 111 | 6.84 | |
| East Malaita | Ben Gale | 97 | 5.98 | |
| East Malaita | Andrew Gwai | 88 | 5.43 | |
| East Malaita | Pita Saefafia Kirimaoma | 87 | 5.36 | |
| East Malaita | Jack Inifiri | 67 | 4.13 | |
| East Malaita | Total | 1,622 | 100 | |
| Eastern Outer Islands | Moffat Bonunga | 1,001 | 50.56 | Elected |
| Eastern Outer Islands | John Melanoli | 503 | 25.40 | |
| Eastern Outer Islands | Shadrach Sade | 199 | 10.05 | |
| Eastern Outer Islands | John Palusi | 176 | 8.89 | |
| Eastern Outer Islands | David Dawea Taukalo | 101 | 5.10 | Unseated |
| Eastern Outer Islands | Total | 1,980 | 100 | |
| Gizo/Ranongga/Simbo/Kolombangara | George Ngumi | 876 | 62.30 | Elected |
| Gizo/Ranongga/Simbo/Kolombangara | Anthony Ramoi | 276 | 19.63 | |
| Gizo/Ranongga/Simbo/Kolombangara | Bruce Ragoso | 148 | 10.53 | |
| Gizo/Ranongga/Simbo/Kolombangara | Aquila Talasasa | 55 | 3.91 | |
| Gizo/Ranongga/Simbo/Kolombangara | Alfred Bisili | 51 | 3.63 | |
| Gizo/Ranongga/Simbo/Kolombangara | Total | 1,406 | 100 | |
| Honiara | Ashley Wickham | 991 | 54.39 | Elected |
| Honiara | Peter J. Salaka | 481 | 26.40 | Unseated |
| Honiara | Colin Bentley | 196 | 10.76 | |
| Honiara | Stephen Anilafa Sipolo | 68 | 3.73 | |
| Honiara | Moses Puibangara Pitakaka | 50 | 2.74 | |
| Honiara | Paul Belande | 36 | 1.98 | |
| Honiara | Total | 1,822 | 100 | |
| Kwaio | Jonathan Fiifii'i | 477 | 36.78 | Re-elected |
| Kwaio | Frank Tafea'a | 330 | 25.44 | |
| Kwaio | Paul Andrew Foasi | 238 | 18.35 | |
| Kwaio | John Maesafi | 200 | 15.42 | |
| Kwaio | John Fisango | 52 | 4.01 | |
| Kwaio | Total | 1,297 | 100 | |
| Lau/Mbaelelea | Philip Solodia | 566 | 44.67 | Elected |
| Lau/Mbaelelea | Mariano Kelesi | 473 | 37.33 | Unseated |
| Lau/Mbaelelea | Nathan Wate | 193 | 15.23 | |
| Lau/Mbaelelea | David Mark Tefetea | 35 | 2.76 | |
| Lau/Mbaelelea | Total | 1,267 | 100 | |
| Marovo/Kusaghe | Samuel Kuku | 577 | 50.09 | Re-elected |
| Marovo/Kusaghe | Pulepada Ghemu | 575 | 49.91 | |
| Marovo/Kusaghe | Total | 1,152 | 100 | |
| Nggela | Moses Mahomed Razak | 537 | 28.17 | Elected |
| Nggela | Abraham Siau | 487 | 25.55 | |
| Nggela | Richard Harper | 419 | 21.98 | |
| Nggela | Cecil Wilson Maneau | 165 | 8.66 | |
| Nggela | Frank Bollan Vikino | 139 | 7.29 | |
| Nggela | Ben Tumulima | 104 | 5.46 | |
| Nggela | Jeremiah Legaile Tovono | 55 | 2.89 | |
| Nggela | Michael Aike | 54 | 2.83 | |
| Nggela | Calisto Houma | 46 | 2.41 | |
| Nggela | Gabriel Narasia | 40 | 2.10 | |
| Nggela | Total | 1,906 | 100 | |
| North West Malaita | Jeriel Ofea Ausuta | 389 | 34.92 | Elected |
| North West Malaita | Clement Kiriau Ofai | 169 | 15.17 | Unseated |
| North West Malaita | Abel Limari'i | 159 | 14.27 | |
| North West Malaita | Bartholomew Leni Olea | 157 | 14.09 | |
| North West Malaita | Lemuel Liolea | 108 | 9.69 | |
| North West Malaita | Augustine Maelfodola | 101 | 9.07 | |
| North West Malaita | Jeriel Lifuasi | 31 | 2.78 | |
| North West Malaita | Total | 1,114 | 100 | |
| Roviana/Rendova | John Page | 714 | 57.53 | Elected |
| Roviana/Rendova | David E Kera | 228 | 18.37 | |
| Roviana/Rendova | Joseph Nona | 162 | 13.05 | |
| Roviana/Rendova | Alphonse Daga | 137 | 11.04 | |
| Roviana/Rendova | Total | 1,241 | 100 | |
| Shortlands/Vella Lavella | Andrew Kukuti | 528 | 41.41 | Elected |
| Shortlands/Vella Lavella | Gordon Siama | 452 | 35.45 | |
| Shortlands/Vella Lavella | Dominic Outana | 295 | 23.14 | |
| Shortlands/Vella Lavella | Total | 1,275 | 100 | |
| Small Malaita | Emilio Li'I Ouou | 608 | 42.40 | Elected |
| Small Malaita | Anthony Saru | 340 | 23.71 | Unseated |
| Small Malaita | George Garnet | 269 | 18.76 | |
| Small Malaita | Richard Watekari | 217 | 15.13 | |
| Small Malaita | Total | 1,434 | 100 | |
| South Guadalcanal/Rennell and Bellona | Stephen Cheka | 440 | 22.73 | Elected |
| South Guadalcanal/Rennell and Bellona | John Tepaika | 387 | 19.99 | |
| South Guadalcanal/Rennell and Bellona | George Pugeva | 347 | 17.92 | Unseated |
| South Guadalcanal/Rennell and Bellona | George Wilson Mangale | 335 | 17.30 | |
| South Guadalcanal/Rennell and Bellona | Paul John | 237 | 12.24 | |
| South Guadalcanal/Rennell and Bellona | Saddia Chachia | 83 | 4.29 | |
| South Guadalcanal/Rennell and Bellona | Pende Cheryn | 76 | 3.93 | |
| South Guadalcanal/Rennell and Bellona | Jokim Gapu | 31 | 1.60 | |
| South Guadalcanal/Rennell and Bellona | Total | 1,936 | 100 | |
| West Guadalcanal and Russells | Matthew Belamataga | 745 | 34.85 | Elected |
| West Guadalcanal and Russells | Orlie Torling | 431 | 20.16 | |
| West Guadalcanal and Russells | K Kesty Ta'afia | 351 | 16.42 | |
| West Guadalcanal and Russells | Bartholomew Buchanan | 260 | 12.16 | |
| West Guadalcanal and Russells | John Baptist Tura | 214 | 10.01 | |
| West Guadalcanal and Russells | Imogen Vida Phillips | 137 | 6.41 | |
| West Guadalcanal and Russells | Total | 2,138 | 100 | |
| West Isabel | Willie Betu | 1,059 | 65.21 | Re-elected |
| West Isabel | Eric Anderson | 565 | 34.79 | |
| West Isabel | Total | 1,624 | 100 | |
| West Kwara'ae | Peter Kerr Thompson | 1,169 | 72.74 | Re-elected |
| West Kwara'ae | Alan Taki | 288 | 17.92 | |
| West Kwara'ae | Leonard Maenu'u | 150 | 9.33 | |
| West Kwara'ae | Total | 1,607 | 100 | |
| West Makira | Solomon Mamaloni | 1,272 | 74.00 | Re-elected |
| West Makira | Nathaniel Rahumae Waena | 447 | 26.00 | |
| West Makira | Total | 1,719 | 100 | |

== Aftermath ==
Following the elections, a new political party – the United Solomon Islands Party (USIP) – was formed by fourteen of the winning candidates. Benedit Kinika was elected chair of the new party, with Gideon Zoloveke as his deputy. The Solomons United National Party became defunct. In January 1974 another new party, the People's Progressive Party (PPP) was formed. Having become defunct late in 1973, USIP was also revived.

Later in the 1974 constitutional amendments converted the Governing Council into a Legislative Assembly and introduced the position of Chief Minister, elected by the Assembly. Both USIP and the PPP attempted to win the support of the Independent Group led by Willie Betu before the vote on 27 August. Six rounds were required before a winner emerged. Solodia Funifaka dropped out after the fourth round, with the fifth round resulting in a tie between Kinika and Solomon Mamaloni. In the sixth round, Mamaloni won by 14 votes to 10 for Kinika. A government was subsequently formed by the PPP independent MPs.

Mamaloni appointed five ministers to his cabinet, keeping the Home Affairs portfolio for himself. David Kausimae became Minister of Agriculture and the Rural Economy, Willie Betu was Minister for Education and Cultural Affairs, Stephen Cheka was Minister of Health and Welfare, Peter Kerr Thompson was Minister of Trade, Industry and Labour and Gideon Zoloveke was Minister of Works and Public Utilities. Zoloveke was moved to the Ministry of Home Affairs in late 1974 and replaced as Minister of Works and Public Utilities by Solodia Funifaka. A cabinet reshuffle took place in 1975, with Peter Kerr Thompson sacked from the cabinet. Willie Betu took over as Minister of Trade, Industry and Labour, with Stephen Cheka taking over from Betu as Minister of Education and Cultural Affairs.

Mamaloni resigned as Chief Minister on 18 November 1975 over deal with an American firm to mint coins celebrating self-government. However, on 1 December he was re-elected as Chief Minister by the Legislative Assembly, defeating Allan Taki by 18 votes to 4. He appointed a new cabinet with Jeriel Ausuta as Minister of Agriculture and Lands, Benedict Kinika as Minister of Education, Willie Betu as Minister of Finance, Pulepada Ghemu as Minister of Foreign Trade, Industry and Labour, Francis Kikolo as Minister of Health and Welfare, Jonathan Fiifii'i as Minister of Home Affairs, David Thuguvoda as Minister of Natural Resources and Ashley Wickham as Minister of Works and Public Utilities. Five of the nine ministers were members of USIP, two were from the PPP and one was an independent.
