= Ajilon Jasper Nasiu =

Solomon Islands politician

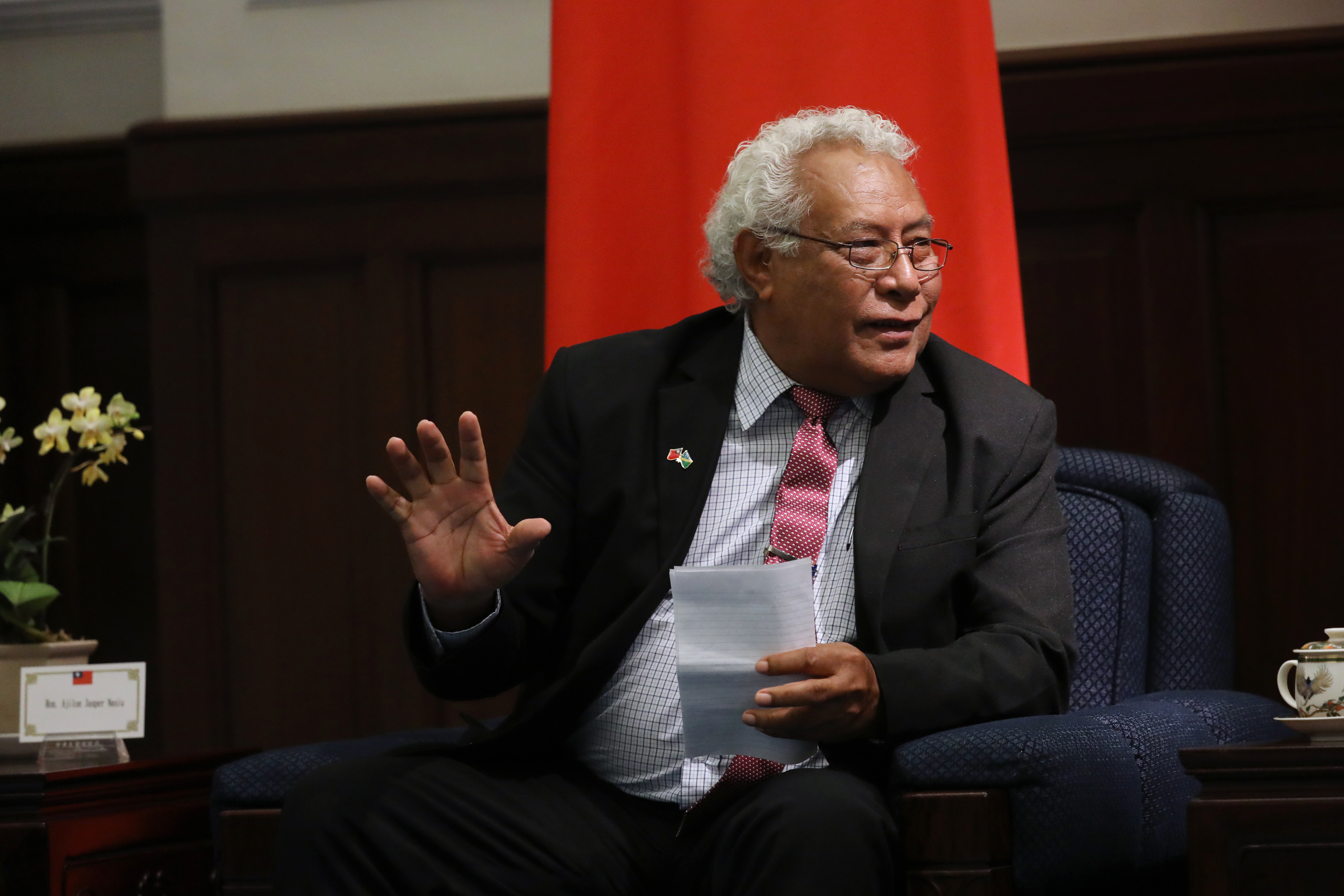

6th Speaker of the National Parliament of Solomon Islands
- In office 17 December 2014 – 15 May 2019
- Preceded by: Allan Kemakeza
- Succeeded by: Patteson Oti

Ajilon Jasper Nasiu is a Solomon Islands public servant who served as the sixth Speaker of the National Parliament of Solomon Islands from 2014 to 2019. He was replaced by Patteson Oti.
Before assuming this post, he had been a Member of the Provincial Assembly (MPA), and was elected Provincial Premier for Rennell and Bellona Province.

Ajilon Jasper Nasiu met with president Tsai Ing-wen of Taiwan on January 31, 2018.
