= Central Solomons constituency =

Central Solomons
- Former Single-member constituency for the Legislative Council of the Solomon Islands

Former constituency
- Created: 1967
- Abolished: 1970

Central Solomons was a single-member constituency of the Legislative Council of the Solomon Islands. It was created in 1967 and abolished in 1970 when the Governing Council was created. Its sole elected member, John Plant Hoka stood for re-election in the Ngella/Savo/Russells constituency in the 1970 elections.

== List of MPs ==
Term	MP	Party
1967–1970	John Plant Hoka	

== Election results ==
1967 general election
Candidate	Party	Votes
John Plant Hoka		646
Ronald Alexander Lawson		463
Ben Duva Tonezepo		196
Abiah Tegheta		195
Erastus Baiave		105
Baiabe Tekiou		29
Kadmiel Tekieu		26
Alick Tehatinga		6
Invalid/blank votes		
Total		1,666
Registered voters		2,727
Source: Election Passport
