= Lanelle Tanangada =

Solomon Islands politician

Lanelle Olandrea Tanangada

Minister for Education
- In office 29 April 2020 – 10 May 2024
- Monarchs: Elizabeth II; Charles III
- Governor-General: David Vunagi
- Prime Minister: Manasseh Sogavare
- Constituency: Gizo/Kolombangara

Personal details
- Born: July 1, 1979 (age 47)
- Party: Kadere Party
- Spouse: Jimson Fiau Tanangada

Lanelle Olandrea Tanangada (born 1 July 1979) is a Solomon Islands teacher and politician who served as the country's Education Minister from April 2020 until May 2024.

== Early life and education ==
Lanelle Oleandra Tanangada was born on 1 July 1979 in Western Province. Her father is part Ranongga and Vella and her mother is from Marovo Lagoon. Her parents were Seventh-day Adventist missionaries and she has one elder brother. She attended SDA mission primary schools in Honiara and Betikama Adventist High School.

Tanangada undertook undergraduate studies at the Pacific Adventist University in Papua New Guinea and received a Master of Education from the University of Waikato in New Zealand in 2013, with a thesis titled A study of language use in secondary school classrooms in the Solomon Islands: Conceptions, practices and proficiencies.

In early 2026, Tanangada moved to Australia to undertake a Master’s degree in Public Policy at the Australian National University on an Australian Government scholarship.

== Career ==
Tanangada was a teacher at SDA schools in Kukudu, Burns Creek and Betikama.

Tanangada was elected as the independent representative for Gizo/Kolombangara constituency in a May 2018 by-election after her husband Jimson Tanangada lost the seat after being convicted of bribing voters during the 2014 election. The charges were brought by former Prime Minister Gordon Darcy Lilo, who then contested the seat. Tanangada defeated Lilo with 2580 votes to his 1593. She was the first woman in the Western Province elected to the Parliament, the only women in the parliament at the time, and the fourth woman MP in the country's history. On 18 October 2019, she was sworn in as Minister for Women, Youth and Children Affairs.

Tanangada joined the Kadere Party and became part of the "Democratic Coalition Government for Advancement". She was re-elected for a full term in the April 2019 elections, again defeating Lilo with 4397 votes to his 4002. She became one of only two women in the 50-seat Parliament. She was appointed Minister for Police, National Security and Correctional Services, a position she resigned from in October 2019. In April 2020, she became Minister for Education and Human Resources Development under Prime Minister Manasseh Sogavare. Tanangada held this position until 2024, when she did not run for re-election as an MP. Her husband was re-elected as MP for Gizo Kolombangara in the April 2024 national election and subsequently appointed Minister of Police, National Security and Correctional Services.

Tanangada worked as Policy Secretary for the Social Sector in the Policy Implementation, Monitoring and Evaluation Unit (PIMEU) within the Office of the Prime Minister and Cabinet until January 2026. In this role she oversaw the rollout of the new Education Act 2023, which was enacted during her tenure as Education Minister.

== Personal life ==
Tanangada is married to Jimson Tanangada and they have two children. She is a Christian.
