= Job Tausinga =

Solomon Islands politician (born 1951)

Job Dudley Tasinga, CSI (born July 18, 1951) is a member of the National Parliament of the Solomon Islands. He lives on New Georgia Island, in the Western Province, and was first elected in 1984.

He was Minister of Foreign Affairs from 1992 to 1993.

On 6 December 2011, he was elected unopposed to the position of deputy Speaker of Parliament, following Namson Tran's resignation from that position. (The Speaker was Allan Kemakeza.)

He is the father of MP Silas Tausinga.
