= Choiseul/Shortlands constituency =

Choiseul/Shortlands
- Former single-member constituency for the Governing Council of the Solomon Islands

Former constituency
- Created: 1970
- Abolished: 1973
- Created from: North Western Solomons
- Replaced by: Choiseul; Shortlands/Vella Lavella

Choiseul/Shortlands was a single-member constituency of the Governing Council of the Solomon Islands. Created in 1970 when the Governing Council was created and the number of constituencies increased from 14 to 17, it covered Choiseul Island and the Shortland Islands.

In the 1970 elections the seat was won by Remesio Eresi. It was abolished in 1973 and succeeded by Choiseul and Shortlands/Vella Lavella.

== List of MPs ==
Term	MP	Party
1970–1973	Remesio Eresi	

== Election results ==
=== 1970 ===
1970 general election
Candidate	Party	Votes
Remesio Eresi		778
Binet Gadebeta		520
Moses Puibangara Pitakaka		506
John Macdonald		173
Total		2,140
Registered voters		3,353
Source: Election Passport
