= United Solomon Islands Party =

The United Solomon Islands Party (USIP or USIPA) was a political party in the Solomon Islands.

== History ==
USIP was formed in August 1973 following the 1973 elections by fourteen of the twenty-four members of the Governing Council. Benedit Kinika was elected chair of the new party, with Gideon Zoloveke as his deputy and Ashley Wickham as party secretary. The fourteen were former civil servants who wanted self-government as soon as possible and for more Solomon Islanders to be employed in the civil service.

At the end of 1973, agreement was reached between members of USIP and conservative independents to create a single party encompassing all elected members. However, the party was revived in April 1974, although it had been reduced in its membership. In the same year, the Governing Council was transformed into the Legislative Assembly and an election was arranged for the position of Chief Minister. Kinika was defeated by Solomon Mamaloni of the rival People's Progressive Party, who became the Islands' first Chief Minister and formed a cabinet of PPP and independent members; Kinika subsequently resigned as USIP leader and was replaced by Philip Funifaka. Mamaloni resigned in November 1975 after an inquiry into action taken without consulting his cabinet, and when he was re-elected in December he formed a cabinet with five USIP members (including Funifuka), two from the PPP and one independent.

Following the formation of the new government and prior to the 1976 general elections, USIP and the PPP both disintegrated, and USIP members became independent MPs.
