= ꞋAreꞌare constituency =

Parliamentary constituency in the Solomon Islands

ꞌAreꞌare
- Former single-member constituency for the Legislative Assembly of the Solomon Islands
- Region: Malaita Province

Former constituency
- Created: 1973
- Abolished: 1976
- Created from: South Central Malaita
- Replaced by: East ꞌAreꞌare & West ꞌAreꞌare

ꞌAreꞌare was a single-member constituency of the Governing Council and Legislative Assembly of the Solomon Islands. Created in 1973 when the Governing Council was expanded from 17 to 24 seats, it was located on the island of Malaita. In the 1973 elections the seat was won by David Kausimae, who had been elected in the South Central Malaita constituency in the 1970 elections, defeating Peter Kenilorea. It was abolished in 1976 and succeeded by East ꞌAreꞌare (which was won by Kenilorea, who went on to be appointed the Islands' first Chief Minister) and West ꞌAreꞌare (in which Kausimae was elected).

== List of MPs ==
Term	MP	Party
1973–1976	David Kausimae	

== Election results ==
=== 1973 ===
1973 general election
Candidate	Party	Votes
David Kausimae		1,223
Peter Kenilorea		714
Total		1,937
Registered voters		
Source: Election Passport
