= Speaker of the National Parliament of Solomon Islands =

Speaker of National Parliament of Solomon Islands
- Incumbent; Patteson Oti since 15 May 2019
- Style: The Right Honourable
- Appointer: National Parliament
- Term length: 4 years

The Speaker of the National Parliament is the Speaker of the National Parliament of the Solomon Islands. The position was established under section 64 of the Constitution of the Solomon Islands of 1978, when the country became independent from the United Kingdom. It is similar to the position of Speaker of the House of Commons in the U.K.; the Solomon Islands is a Commonwealth realm and maintains a Westminster system of government.

The Speaker is elected to the post by Members of Parliament every four years, as mandated by Order 5 of the Standing Orders of the National Parliament. The latter Order stipulates that "Every citizen of Solomon Islands over the age of twenty-one and who is otherwise qualified for election as a Member shall be eligible for election as Speaker". Thus the Speaker is not necessarily chosen from among sitting MPs, unlike the procedure governing the election of the Speaker in the United Kingdom. Indeed, Peter Kenilorea was not an MP when he was elected Speaker in 2001, and Allan Kemakeza was elected Speaker after failing to retain his seat in Parliament in the 2010 general election. The only person so far to have been a sitting MP when elected Speaker was Waita Ben Tabusasi, in 1989. He vacated his seat as MP for North East Guadalcanal upon assuming the duties of Speaker; the resulting by-election led to Hilda Kari becoming the first ever woman in the Solomon Islands Parliament.

The speaker's role, as per section 65 of the Constitution, is to "preside at any sitting of Parliament". The speaker is expected to "ensure that Members conduct themselves in accordance to the Standing Orders of National Parliament".

== Presidents of the Legislative Council of the Solomon Islands ==
The President of the Legislative Council of the Solomon Islands (1960–1970) was the High Commissioner for the Western Pacific.

== Chairmen of the Governing Council ==
Name	Took office	Left office	Notes
Tom Russell	1970	August 1971	Also acting High Commissioner
Silas Sitai	August 1971	October 1972	Died in office
Sir Michael Gass	October 1972	1973	Also High Commissioner
Donald Luddington	October 1973	September 1974	Also High Commissioner
Frederick Osifelo	September 1974	October 1974	

== Speaker of the Legislative Assembly ==
Name	Took office	Left office	Notes
Sir Frederick Osifelo	October 1974	1978	

== Speakers of the National Parliament ==
The following MPs have served as Speaker since the First Parliament in 1978.

Name	Took office	Left office	Notes
Lloyd Maepeza Gina	August 1978	1988	
Waita Ben Tabusasi	14 March 1989	10 July 1993	
Paul Tovua	1994	2001	
Sir Peter Kenilorea	2001	September 2010	
Allan Kemakeza	8 September 2010	17 December 2014	
Ajilon Nasiu	17 December 2014	15 May 2019	
Patteson Oti	15 May 2019	Incumbent	

== Deputy Speaker ==
The Constitution also provides for a deputy speaker. Per article 64, the Deputy Speaker is elected by Parliament from among its members, whereas the speaker may be elected from outside Parliament. A deputy speaker who becomes speaker must vacate their seat in parliament. The leader of a political party in Parliament may not serve as deputy speaker.

The deputy speaker carries out the functions of the speaker if the latter is unable to do so. However, per article 71 of the Constitution, while the speaker has "neither an original nor a casting vote", the deputy speaker, when presiding Parliament, may not cast an original vote but "shall exercise a casting vote if on any question the votes are equally divided".

Job Dudley Tausinga, Rural Advancement Party MP for North New Georgia was elected unopposed to the position on 6 December 2011 following the resignation of Namson Tran, independent MP for West Honiara. Tausinga, a veteran MP, lost his seat in the 2014 general election. John Moffat Fugui, Independent MP for Central Honiara, was elected Deputy Speaker on 17 December 2014, with 29 votes to David Tome's 21.
