= Eastern Outer Islands =

Eastern Outer Islands may refer to:

- Santa Cruz Islands, an island group in the Solomon Islands
- Eastern Outer Islands constituency, a former constituency in the Solomon Islands
