= Central Malaita constituency =

Constituency of National Parliament of the Solomon Islands

Central Malaita
- Former Single-member constituency for the National Parliament of the Solomon Islands
- Region: Malaita Province

Former constituency
- Created: 1967
- Abolished: 1993

Central Malaita was a single-member constituency of the Legislative Council, Governing Council, Legislative Assembly and National Parliament of Solomon Islands between 1967 and 1993. It was abolished when Parliament was increased in size from 38 to 47 seats. Its final MP, Francis Joseph Saemala, was re-elected in the Aoke/Langalanga constituency in the 1993 general elections.

== List of MPs ==
Term	MP	Party
1967–1970	Peter Taloni	
1970–1973	Jonathan Fiifii'i	
1973–1976	Collin Gauwane	
1976–1980	Collin Gauwane	
1980–1984	Adrian Bataiofesi	
1984–1989	Adrian Bataiofesi	
1989–1993	Francis Joseph Saemala	

== Election results ==
=== 1989 ===
1989 general election
Candidate	Party	Votes
Francis Joseph Saemala		658
John Paul Dio		500
Adrian Bataiofesi		476
Walton Willy Abuito'o		371
Harold Maomatekwa		138
David Thomas Maeigoa		76
Robertson Buaite'e		42
David Fox Folomane		21
Edwin Misi		19
Frank Fosala		9
Invalid/blank votes		
Total		2,310
Registered voters		3,945
Source: Election Passport

=== 1984 ===
1984 general elections
Candidate	Party	Votes
Adrian Bataiofesi		615
Collin Gauwane		320
Japhlet Fono		157
Walter Andy Ofonani		135
Clifton Kalu		95
Tina Wawane		90
Harold Maomatekwa		89
Philip Jack Aru		86
Ariel Bill Arafamae		60
Harry Toliabu		30
Justus Charles Lesimaoma		29
David Maefasia		24
Andrew Saeni		17
Invalid/blank votes		
Total		1,747
Registered voters		
Source: Election Passport

=== 1980 ===
1980 general election
Candidate	Party	Votes
Adrian Bataiofesi		412
Collin Gauwane		271
John Paul Dio		234
B. Bosokuru		222
R. Folota		113
Vincent Talauburi		97
Lionel Oloni		81
Frank Fosala		41
F. Kona		23
George Maelalo		20
Pita Saefafia Kirimaoma		15
Invalid/blank votes		
Total		1,529
Registered voters		3,427
Source: Election Passport

=== 1976 ===
1976 general election
Candidate	Party	Votes
Collin Gauwane		376
Abraham Baeanisia		221
George Maelalo		193
Alfred Maetia		188
Francis Joseph Saemala		108
Francis Walelia		59
Martin Anifasipetele		34
Invalid/blank votes		
Total		1,179
Registered voters		
Source: Election Passport

=== 1973 ===
1973 general election
Candidate	Party	Votes
Collin Gauwane		567
George Maelalo		243
Lionel Oloni		201
Vincent Talauburi		190
Jazial Fono		133
Frank Lulu Bare		89
Timeous Teioli		65
Nelson Kifo		12
Invalid/blank votes		
Total		1,500
Registered voters		
Source: Election Passport

=== 1970 ===
1970 general election
Candidate	Party	Votes
Jonathan Fiifii'i		613
Daniel Foasifobae		442
Peter Taloni		284
Nelson Kifo		173
Calisto Kobiloko		169
Invalid/blank votes		
Total		1,681
Registered voters		4,450
Source: Election Passport

=== 1967 ===
1967 general election
Candidate	Party	Votes
Peter Taloni		566
Arnon Atomea		202
Robert Harold Gordon		121
Abiather Anifela		44
Invalid/blank votes		
Total		933
Registered voters		2,645
Source: Election Passport
