= 1965 Solomon Islands general election =

General elections were held in the Solomon Islands for the first time on 7 April 1965.

== Background ==
In 1960 a Legislative Council was established composed entirely of appointed members. Of the 21, only six were Solomon Islanders. Following a White Paper in 1963, the British Privy Council approved a new constitution for the British Solomon Islands on 25 September 1964, replacing the 1960 constitution. On 4 November the British Solomon Islands Order was passed by the Parliament of the United Kingdom, bringing into force section 31, which related to the holding of elections prior to the rest of the constitution coming into effect on 1 February 1965.

== Electoral system ==
The new constitution provided for a 22-seat Legislative Council, consisting of the Governor, eleven civil servants, two members appointed by the High Commissioner and eight elected members. Of the elected members, three represented Malaita, two represented Central District, whilst Eastern District, Western District and Honiara had one member each.

Although the Honiara representative was directly elected by universal suffrage (with the voting age set at 21), the remaining seven members were elected by electoral colleges. The colleges were composed of elected local councillors, with one member per 500 residents of the constituency. Where the number of elected councillors was insufficient, councillors could elect further members by secret ballot. The colleges then elected the members of the Legislative Council; preliminary ballots were used to eliminate the lowest-scoring candidate until only two remained, at which point the candidate with a majority of votes was elected.

== Campaign ==
Two candidates – Eric Lawson and C.H. Cheng – contested the Honiara seat, with 44 candidates contesting the indirectly-elected seats.

Around 1,100 people registered to vote in Honiara.

== Results ==
Eric Lawson was elected in Honiara. The sole female candidate, Lilly Ogatina, was elected in Central Solomons. Leonard Alufurai and James Michael Wall were appointed as unofficial members.

Constituency	Candidate	Votes	Notes
Guadalcanal	Michael Rapasia	18	Elected
Guadalcanal	Joe Byron	3	
Central Malaita	Lucius Noi		Elected
Central Malaita	A. Baeanisia		
Central Malaita	Peter Taloni		
Central Malaita	J.P. Vailua		
Central Solomons	Lilly Ogatina		Elected
Central Solomons	C. Fagitavemu		
Central Solomons	P.A. Kakaluae		
Central Solomons	S. Niavuni		
Central Solomons	John Plant Hoka		
Eastern Solomons	Jack Campbell		Elected
Eastern Solomons	M. Bolam		
Eastern Solomons	B. Bonie		
Eastern Solomons	P. Boninga		
Eastern Solomons	W. Iamalo		
Eastern Solomons	A. Letade		
Eastern Solomons	O. Loanu		
Eastern Solomons	J. Melanoli		
Eastern Solomons	E. Nokali		
Eastern Solomons	S.G. Sade		
Eastern Solomons	R. Suiga		
Eastern Solomons	B. Tunable		
Honiara	Eric Lawson		Elected
Honiara	C.H. Cheng		
North Malaita	Mariano Kelesi		Elected
North Malaita	Arnon Atomea		
North Malaita	J. Dick		
North Malaita	L. Liolae		
South Malaita	David Kausimae		Elected
South Malaita	E. Ahikau		
South Malaita	J. Fifi		
South Malaita	J.D. George		
South Malaita	Robert Harold Gordon		
South Malaita	A. Laealaha		
South Malaita	P. Mamani		
South Malaita	J. Warahimae		
Western Solomons	John Macdonald		Elected
Western Solomons	E. Buadromo		
Western Solomons	L. Boseto		
Western Solomons	S. Kana		
Western Solomons	John Wesley Kere		
Western Solomons	R. Kimisi		
Western Solomons	W.G. Paia		
Western Solomons	I. Vila		
Western Solomons	A. Viva		
Source: Pacific Islands Monthly
