= Namson Tran =

Solomon Islands politician (born 1968)

The Right Honourable Namson Tran MP

Deputy Speaker of the National Parliament
- In office 8 September 2010 – 6 December 2011
- Prime Minister: Danny Philip
- Succeeded by: Job Dudley Tausinga

Member of Parliament for West Honiara
- Incumbent
- Assumed office 4 August 2010
- Preceded by: Isaac Inoke Tosika

Personal details
- Born: 3 December 1968 (age 57) Vietnam
- Party: Independent

Namson Tran (born 3 December 1968 in Vietnam) is a Solomon Islands businessman and politician.

Born in Vietnam, Tran moved first to Vanuatu then to Solomon Islands, where he married a Solomon Islander and became a naturalised citizen.

He worked as an accountant before becoming "a high-profile businessman", the owner of Honiara Casino, the "biggest casino" in the Solomons.

His political career began when he was elected to the National Parliament as MP for West Honiara, a constituency in the capital city, Honiara, in the August 2010 general election. He was elected as an independent, being a member of no political party. The following month, he was elected Deputy Speaker of Parliament, as deputy to Speaker Sir Allan Kemakeza. He resigned from the deputy speakership at the start of December 2011.
