= Jonathan Fiifii'i =

Solomon Islands politician (1921–1989)

Jonathan Fiifii'i MBE (1921 – October 1989) was a Kwaio from Ane'emae near Oloburi, Malaita, Solomon Islands. His father was Buumae and mother Dafua.

== Biography ==
Fiifii'i was a founding member of Maasina Ruru, the independence movement that he started in 1945 with Nori and Aliki Nono'oohimae, whom he met while serving in the Solomon Islands Labour Corps during World War II.

After being arrested and held by the British administration as a political prisoner, he was released and continued to be involved in politics, beginning with the Subdistrict Committee in Ngarinaasuru. In the 1970 general elections he was elected to the Governing Council in the Central Malaita constituency. He was re-elected in the 1973 elections in the Kwaio constituency.

In 1976 he was elected to the Legislative Assembly (into which the Governing Council had been transformed in 1974) from the East Kwaio constituency. He lost his seat in 1980 to Daniel Foasifobae.

He was appointed a Member of the Order of the British Empire (MBE) in the 1981 Birthday Honours for political service.

He challenged Foasifobae again in the 1984 elections, but lost again.

He remained critical of the government, even after independence. He formed the Kwaio Cultural Centre in 1979.

In 1982, he wrote his autobiography, From pig-theft to parliament, which was translated and edited by Roger Keesing.
