= Central Solomons =

Central Solomons may refer to:

- Central Province (Solomon Islands), a province of the Solomon Islands
- Central Solomons constituency, a constituency in the Legislative Council of the Solomon Islands
- Central Solomon languages, a group of languages spoken in the Solomon Islands
