= Democratic Party (Solomon Islands, historical) =

The Democratic Party was the first political party in the Solomon Islands.

== History ==
The party was established in June 1965 by Mariano Kelesi and Eric Lawson. Kelesi and Lawson were both members of the Legislative Council, and the formation of the party was aimed at bringing together elected members, which had been introduced to the Council in 1964. In total, eight MLCs joined the new party.

The party had disappeared by 1967.
