= Gizo/Ranongga/Simbo/Kolombangara constituency =

Gizo/Ranongga/Simbo/Kolombangara
- Former Single-member constituency for the Legislative Assembly of the Solomon Islands
- Region: Western Province

Former constituency
- Created: 1973
- Abolished: 1976
- Created from: Vella Lavella/Kolombangara
- Replaced by: Gizo/Kolombangara; Ranongga/Simbo

Gizo/Ranongga/Simbo/Kolombangara was a single-member constituency of the Governing Council and Legislative Assembly. Located in Western Province, it covered the islands of Gizo, Kolombangara, Ranongga and Simbo. It was established in 1973 when the Governing Council was expanded from 17 to 24 seats, and was abolished in 1976 when the Legislative Assembly (which the Governing Council had been transformed into in 1974) was enlarged to 38 seats, at which point it was split into Gizo/Kolombangara and Ranongga/Simbo. The constituency's sole MP, George Ngumi, contested the Gizo/Kolombangara seat in the 1976 elections, but was defeated by Lawry Eddie Wickham.

== List of MPs ==
Term	MP	Party
1973–1976	George Ngumi	

== Election results ==
=== 1973 ===
1973 general election
Candidate	Party	Votes
George Ngumi		876
Anthony Ramoi		276
Bruce Ragoso		148
Aquila Talasasa		55
Alfred Bisili		51
Invalid/blank votes		
Total		1,406
Registered voters		
Source: Election Passport
