= Patteson Oti =

Solomon Islands politician (born 1956)

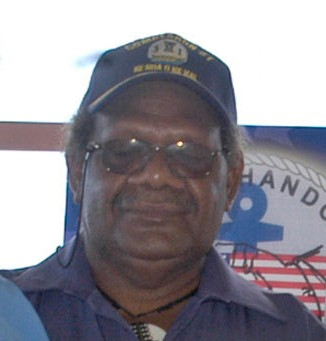
Oti in 2007

John Patteson Oti, sometimes called Patterson Oti (born 17 January 1956), is a Solomon Islands politician and diplomat. He was Minister for Foreign Affairs, External Trade and Immigration from May 2006 to 22 December 2007. He is the secretary general of the Ownership, Unity and Responsibility Party ("Our Party"), which was launched in early 2010. Since March 2012, he has been his country's High Commissioner to Fiji.

Oti was a desk officer at the Ministry of Foreign Affairs from 1983 to 1990 and a Provincial Secretary for the Ministry of Provincial Government from 1991 to 1993. He was a political analyst for the government of Prime Minister Francis Billy Hilly in 1994, and from 1995 to 1997, he was special secretary to the Leader of the Opposition.

He was first elected to the National Parliament of the Solomon Islands for Temotu Nende Constituency in the August 1997 parliamentary election, and under Prime Minister Bartholomew Ulufa'alu he served as Minister for Foreign Affairs from August 1997 to June 2000. In the December 2001 election, he was re-elected to his seat, and he served as Leader of the Opposition Group in Parliament from December 2001 to May 2003. He was also a member of the Public Accounts Committee from 2000 to 2001 and was the committee's Chairman in 2002.

Oti was subsequently Minister for Communication, Aviation & Meteorology from January 2004 to February 2005 and Deputy Speaker of the National Parliament from February 2005 to December 2005. He was re-elected to his seat in the April 2006 parliamentary election and was again a candidate for the post of Deputy Speaker late in the month, although the post was won by Allan Kemakeza. Under Prime Minister Manasseh Sogavare, Oti became Foreign Minister for a second time on May 5, 2006.

In mid-August 2006, Oti resigned from the National Party.

After Sogavare was defeated in a no-confidence vote in December 2007, Oti was the government's candidate to replace Sogavare as Prime Minister, but he was defeated by opposition candidate Derek Sikua in the vote held on December 20, receiving 15 votes against 32 for Sikua.

No longer in Parliament following the 2010 general election, Oti considered standing for the position of Speaker of Parliament (the Speaker being selected from outside the assembly) and obtained the support of both the government and the opposition, before unexpectedly withdrawing. He later served as the government's "special envoy" to the Melanesian Spearhead Group, then, in September 2011, was appointed High Commissioner (i.e., Ambassador) to Fiji. The Solomon Islands Broadcasting Corporation described his appointment as "another demoralising blow to trained career diplomats", as it suggested a tendency to appoint politicians rather than professional diplomats to head diplomatic missions. Oti was sworn in as High Commissioner to Fiji on 19 March 2012.
