= Territory of New Guinea =

Australian territory from 1919 to 1975

Coordinates: 5°00′S 145°00′E

- 1914–1975
- Flag Badge

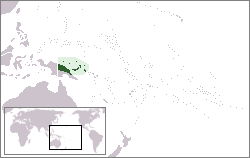
- Status: Occupied by Australia (1914–1920); Class C League of Nations mandate of Australia (1920–1946); United Nations trust territory under Australian administration (1946–1949)
- Capital: Rabaul (1914–1937); Lae (1937–1942); Wau (1942)
- Capital-in-exile: Port Moresby
- Common languages: English (official); Austronesian languages Papuan languages English creoles German creoles
- Monarch
  - 1914–1936: George V
  - 1952–1975: Elizabeth II
- Administrator
  - 1914–1915: William Holmes (first)
  - 1934–1942: Walter McNicoll (last) (Note: McNicoll was the last administrator who ran a separate administration from Papua)
- Legislature: Legislature
  - Upper house: Executive Council
  - Lower house: Legislative Council
- Historical era: Interwar period
  - Australian occupation: 17 September 1914
  - Treaty of Versailles: 28 June 1919
  - Union with Papua: 16 September 1975
- Currency: New Guinean pound (1914–1966); Australian dollar (1966–75); Oceanian pound (1942–45)
Preceded by
1919: German New Guinea
1945: Japanese occupation of New Guinea
Japanese occupation of the Solomon Islands
Succeeded by
1941: Japanese occupation of New Guinea
Japanese occupation of the Solomon Islands
1949: Territory of Papua and New Guinea
1975: Papua New Guinea

The Territory of New Guinea was an Australian-administered territory, first as a League of Nations mandate and then as a United Nations trust territory, in the northeastern part of the island of New Guinea and nearby islands, from 1914 until 1975. In 1949, it was united with the Territory of Papua to create the Territory of Papua and New Guinea. That administrative union was renamed as Papua New Guinea in 1971. Notwithstanding that it was part of an administrative union, the Territory of New Guinea at all times retained a distinct legal status and identity until the advent of the Independent State of Papua New Guinea.

The initial Australian mandate, entitled the Mandate for the German Possessions in the Pacific Ocean situated South of the Equator other than German Samoa and Nauru, was based on the previous German New Guinea, which had been captured and occupied by Australian forces during World War I.

Most of the Territory of New Guinea was occupied by Imperial Japan during the Pacific War, between 1942 and 1945. During this time, Rabaul, on the island of New Britain, became a major Japanese base (see New Guinea campaign). After the war, the territories of Papua and New Guinea were combined in an administrative union under the Papua New Guinea Provisional Administration Act (1945–46).

== Background ==
In 1884, the German Empire formally took possession of the northeast quarter of New Guinea and it became known as German New Guinea. In the same year, the British government proclaimed a protectorate over the southeastern quarter of New Guinea. The protectorate, called British New Guinea, was annexed by Britain outright on 4 September 1888. The territory was transferred to the newly federated Commonwealth of Australia on 18 March 1902, and British New Guinea became the Territory of Papua, with Australian administration beginning in 1906.

== World War I to League of Nations mandate ==
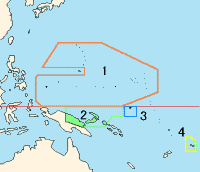
Mandates in the Pacific: 1. South Seas Mandate; 2. Mandate of New Guinea; 3. Mandate of Nauru; 4. Western Samoa Mandate

One of the first actions of Australia's armed forces during World War I was the seizure by the Australian Naval and Military Expeditionary Force of German New Guinea and the neighbouring islands of the Bismarck Archipelago in October 1914. Germany administered several territories in the south and central Pacific which the British requested be captured by Australian and New Zealand forces. On 11 September 1914, a Royal Australian Navy force arrived off Rabaul with the Australian Naval and Military Expeditionary Force and naval troops were landed at Herbertshohe and Kabakaul to search for German radio stations, facing some minor German resistance. Rabaul was occupied, unopposed, on 12 September. The German administration surrendered German New Guinea on 17 September. Australian troops and vessels were subsequently dispatched to occupy Germany's other territories including the New Guinea mainland, New Ireland, the Admiralty Islands, the Western Islands, Bougainville, and the German Solomons. The colony remained under Australian military control until 1921.

At the 1919 Paris Peace Conference following the war, Australian Prime Minister Billy Hughes sought to secure possession of New Guinea from the defeated German Empire: telling the Conference: "Strategically the northern islands (such as New Guinea) encompass Australia like fortresses. They are as necessary to Australia as water to a city."

Article 22 of the Treaty of Versailles provided for the division of Germany and the Central Powers' imperial possessions among the victorious Allies of World War I. In the Pacific, Japan gained Germany's islands north of the equator (the Marshall Islands, the Caroline Islands, the Marianas Islands, the Palau Islands) and Kiautschou in China. German Samoa was assigned to New Zealand; German New Guinea, the Bismarck Archipelago and Nauru to Australia as League of Nations Mandates: territories "formerly governed [by the Central Powers] and which are inhabited by peoples not yet able to stand by themselves under the strenuous conditions of the modern world". Article 22 said:

There are territories, such as South-West Africa and certain of the South Pacific Islands, which, owing to the sparseness of their population, or their small size, or their remoteness from the centres of civilisation, or their geographical contiguity to the territory of the Mandatory, and other circumstances, can be best administered under the laws of the Mandatory as integral portions of its territory, subject to the safeguards above mentioned in the interests of the indigenous population.

Australia assumed a mandate from the League of Nations for governing the Territory on 17 December 1920. The terms of the mandate were not received in Australia until April 1921. This mandate was enacted and administered by the Australian Government through the New Guinea Act 1920 until the outbreak of the Pacific War and Japanese invasion in December 1941 brought about its suspension.

== Interwar Period ==
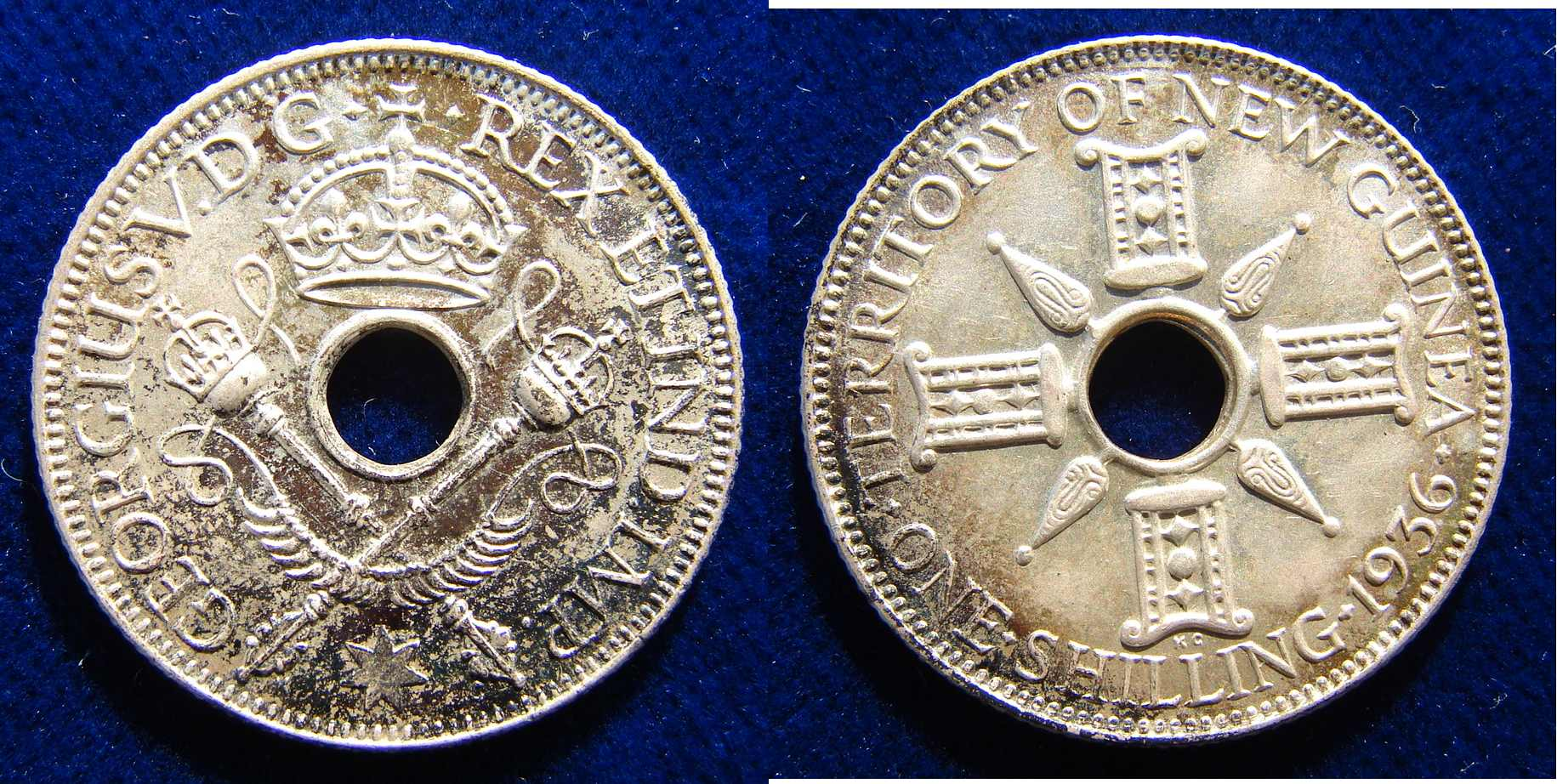
1936 silver shilling of the TNG, with native designs on reverse

The first civilian administrator, Brigadier-General Evan Wisdom, made Rabaul on the island of New Britain the capital of the Australian Mandate New Guinea. The German settlers in the territory of New Guinea were expropriated from 1921 and expelled to Germany, only a few Germans were allowed to stay.

The dynamic economic development of the former German colony, which occurred during the tenure of Governor Albert Hahl, stagnated because of the expropriations. Around 268 plantations, 20 larger shops, workshops and operating facilities were sold to new owners. Many of the new plantation owners, often former Australian soldiers, had little experience of farming in tropical climates.

Originally, the German missionaries should also be expelled. However, through the influence of American and Australian Lutherans, the Neuendettelsau missionaries were able to continue their work and were allowed to travel to New Guinea again from 1928. The Steyler missionaries and the Steyler Missionary Sisters were also affected by the planned deportation. The Apostolic Delegate in Australia, Archbishop Bartolomeo Cattaneo (1866–1933), advocated the whereabouts of the German-speaking Catholic missionaries, from the orders of the Sacred Heart Missionaries (MSC), Marists (SM) and the Society of the Divine Word (SVD) ), who held this post in Australia from 1917 to 1933. The Archbishops of Sydney and New York also appealed to the Australian and American governments, asking that the deportation plans be withdrawn. To this day, German missionaries from the Protestant Neuendettelsauer Mission and the Catholic Sacred Heart of Jesus and Steyler missionaries work in Papua New Guinea.

From 1926, after Germany joined the League of Nations, Germans could no longer be expelled from the territory of a League of Nations mandate. In the 1930s there were 4,500 foreigners in the Mandate New Guinea, four times more than in Papua, including 1,000 Chinese and 400 Germans.

In 1921 gold was found in Wau. A few years later, as a result of the gold rush, gold seekers streamed through the port of Salamaua to Wau. In 1926 another, more productive gold field was found on Edie Creek near Wau. Since there were no roads yet and the transport over mountain paths was very laborious for the gold prospectors, it was necessary to fly in the heavy equipment. In 1937 and 1938, Bulolo Gold Dredging & Co and Guinea Airways moved more air freight with four Junkers G 31 cargo planes between Lae and Wau than in the rest of the world combined. In 1932 an Executive and Legislative Council were established to assist the Administrator.

Wisdom was replaced on June 13, 1933, by Brigadier General Thomas Griffiths. Brigadier General Walter Ramsay McNicoll followed on September 13, 1934. In Rabaul, the eruptions of the volcano Mount Tavurvur and its neighbouring summit Matupit on the Vulcan Island on May 29, 1937, led to extensive destruction of the infrastructure and made the city almost uninhabitable. The seat of the administration of the territory was moved to Lae on the island of New Guinea. When Lae was destroyed by a Japanese air raid on January 20, 1942, Administrator McNicoll moved the administration to Wau. McNicoll contracted malaria and had to resign at the end of 1942.

== World War II ==
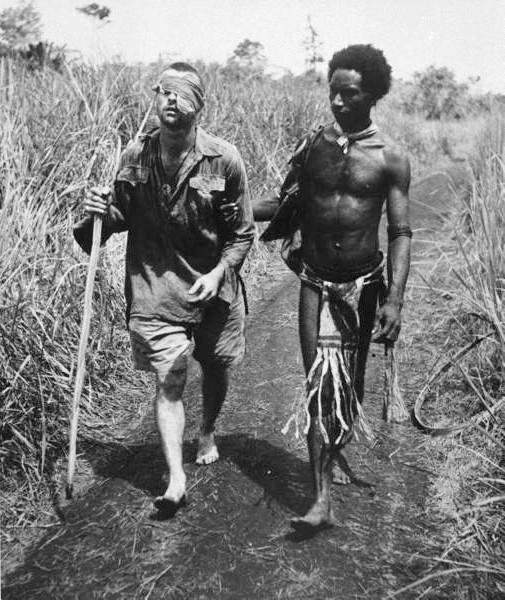
Australian soldier, Private George "Dick" Whittington, being aided by Papuan orderly Raphael Oimbari near Buna on 25 December 1942

Shortly after the start of the Pacific War, New Guinea was invaded by the Japanese. Most of West Papua, at that time known as Dutch New Guinea, was occupied, as were large parts of the Territory of New Guinea but the Territory of Papua was protected to a large extent by its southern location and the near-impassable Owen Stanley Ranges to the north.

The New Guinea campaign opened with the battles for New Britain and New Ireland in the Territory of New Guinea in 1942. Rabaul, the capital of the Territory was overwhelmed on 22–23 January and was established as a major Japanese base from whence they landed on mainland New Guinea and advanced towards Port Moresby and Australia. Having had their initial effort to capture Port Moresby by a seaborne invasion disrupted by the U.S. Navy in the Battle of the Coral Sea, the Japanese attempted a landward invasion from the north via the Kokoda Track. From July 1942, a few Australian reserve battalions, many of them very young and untrained, fought a stubborn rearguard action against a Japanese advance along the Kokoda Track, towards Port Moresby, over the rugged Owen Stanley Ranges. Local Papuans, called Fuzzy Wuzzy Angels by the Australians, assisted and escorted injured Australian troops down the Kokoda track. The militia, worn out and severely depleted by casualties, were relieved in late August by regular troops from the Second Australian Imperial Force, returning from action in the Mediterranean theater.

The Japanese on the Kokoda Track were ordered to retreat to the coast so the Japanese could focus their efforts on the Battle of Guadalcanal, and the Australians pursued them back to the Buna-Gona area. The bitter Battle of Buna-Gona followed in which Australian and United States forces attacked the main Japanese beachheads in New Guinea, at Buna, Sanananda and Gona. Facing tropical disease, difficult terrain and well-constructed Japanese defences, the allies finally achieved victory after experiencing heavy casualties. The offensives in Papua and New Guinea of 1943–44 were the single largest series of connected operations ever mounted by the Australian armed forces. The Supreme Commander of operations was the United States General Douglas Macarthur, with Australian General Thomas Blamey taking a direct role in planning and operations being essentially directed by staff at New Guinea Force headquarters in Port Moresby. Bitter fighting continued in New Guinea between the largely Australian force and the Japanese 18th Army based in New Guinea until the Surrender of Japan to end the war on 2 September 1945. The New Guinea campaign was a major campaign of the Pacific War. In all, some 200,000 Japanese soldiers, sailors and airmen died during the campaign against approximately 7,000 Australian and 7,000 American service personnel.

== Administrative unification with Papua ==
After the war, civil administration of Papua and of New Guinea was restored, and under the Papua New Guinea Provisional Administration Act, 1945–46, Papua and New Guinea were combined in a new administrative union. The Papua and New Guinea Act 1949 united the Territory of Papua and the Territory of New Guinea as the Territory of Papua and New Guinea. However, for the purposes of Australian nationality a distinction was maintained between the two territories. The act provided for a Legislative Council (which was established in 1951), a judicial organization, a public service, and a system of local government.

Under Australian Minister for External Territories Andrew Peacock, the territory adopted self-government in 1972 and on 15 September 1975, during the term of the Whitlam government in Australia, the Territory became the independent nation of Papua New Guinea.
