= Japanese occupation of New Guinea =

1941–1945 occupation during World War II

New Guinea ニューギニア (Nyū Ginia) Niugini
- Flag Imperial Seal
- Anthem: "Kimigayo"
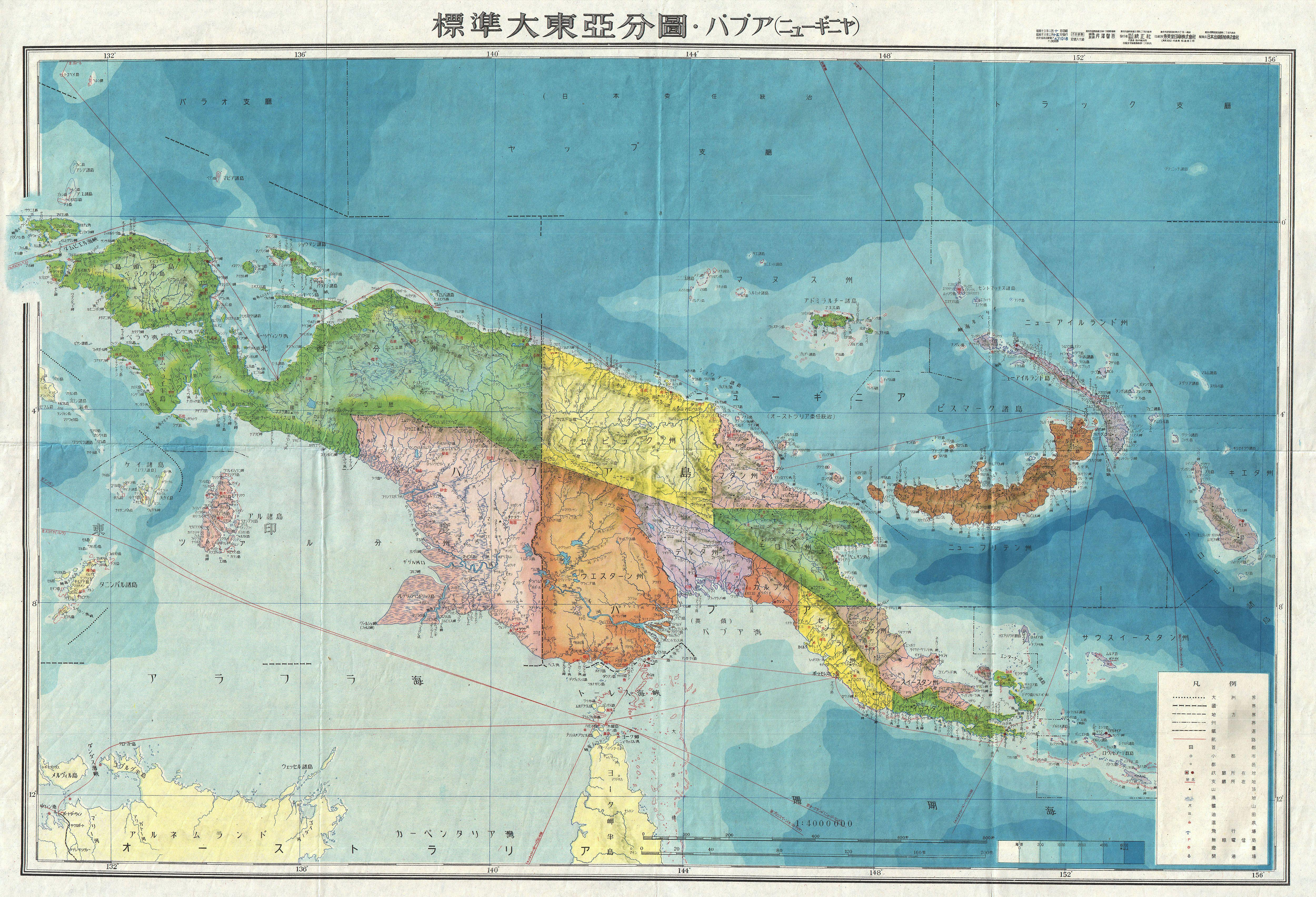
- 1943 Japanese map of New Guinea
- Status: Military occupation by the Empire of Japan
- Capital: Hollandia
- Common languages: Japanese; Tok Pisin, Dutch, English, Other
- Gunshireikan
  - 1942–1945: Hatazō Adachi
- Historical era: World War II
Preceded by	Succeeded by
Dutch East Indies; Territory of New Guinea	Dutch East Indies; Territory of New Guinea
- Today part of: Indonesia (West Papua); Papua New Guinea

The Japanese occupation of New Guinea was the military occupation of the northern portion of the island of New Guinea by the Empire of Japan from 1941 to 1945 during World War II.

Following the attack on Pearl Harbor and the outbreak of the Pacific War in December 1941, Japanese forces invaded the Australian-administered Territory of New Guinea and Dutch New Guinea in early 1942, capturing the respective territorial capitals of Rabaul in February 1942 and Hollandia in April 1942. The subsequent New Guinea campaign saw Japanese forces advance into the Australian territory of Papua in the south-east of New Guinea, but the intended capture of Port Moresby as part of Operation Mo was unsuccessful. The Japanese positions in New Guinea were reclaimed by Allied forces by the end of the war.

== Background ==
In 1941, the island of New Guinea was divided into Dutch New Guinea in the west (administered as part of the Dutch East Indies), the Australian territory of Papua in the south-east, and the Australian-administered New Guinea mandate in the north-east. Japanese forces invaded the northern portions of the island in early 1942, following the outbreak of the Pacific War, quickly capturing the New Guinea territorial capital of Rabaul and forcing an evacuation of Australian civilians in the mandate. Japanese forces also subsequently occupied the Dutch administrative capital Hollandia (today known as Jayapura) and established it as their capital during their occupation in New Guinea.

== Administration ==
=== Hollandia ===
Japanese forces captured and occupied Hollandia in April 1942 and it was established as the capital of the administration. The Imperial Japanese Navy established a base in Jayapura port in 1942. The Navy also anchored their ships in Humboldt Bay and later added infantry troops to strengthen their marines. According to the Allies, there were two infantry regiments in Papua and one marine regiment.

The Dutch had tried to increase trade from Papua, but the Japanese increased it even more. The Japanese later established Cenderawasih University in 1943. In Hollandia, the Japanese forced the native Papuans to create roads and at Lake Sentani there were three airfields created by manual labour. The occupation of Jayapura was described as the worst in all of the Dutch East Indies

In April 1944, US troop entered in Hollandia and fought with Japanese forces which later ended in a victory for the allies with US troops occupying the city.

=== Sentani ===
The town of Sentani was occupied by Japanese forces on 1943 which later ended on 1944, when Allied troops rounded up 800 Japanese soldiers and killed them all.

=== Kavieng ===
The town of Kavieng of New Ireland was occupied by Japanese forces in January 1942 and there was a military base established there by the Japanese, smaller than the one at Rabaul. The town was frequently bombed by allied forces throughout 1943-1944 until it was liberated by Australian and American troops in 1945. There are many sunken ships of the Japanese on the coastline of Kavieng, which is now a popular tourist destination. Nearly the whole town was destroyed after allied troops took it back due to bombings in the area.

=== Rabaul ===
On 23 January 1942, 5,000 Japanese forces captured Rabaul. There were around 100 ships docked at Simpson Harbour, and many Koreans, British, and Indians were forced into labour on Rabaul. On 13 September 1945, Australian troops captured the city, ending the occupation.

== Demographics ==
Most people were native Papuans, but there were many Japanese who were primarily soldiers. There was a huge number of Chinese who were deported from other occupied regions of New Guinea and sent to Rabaul. There were small numbers of British, Indian, Korean, and Taiwanese from other parts of the empire who were deported to New Guinea.

== War crimes ==
The Japanese were not hesitant to shoot anybody according to Allied forces and they often treated New Guineans with extreme brutality. Many were killed on the spot if they did not listen to what the Japanese troops said. Moreover, Civilians were forced into labour, rape was prevalent, and the Japanese committed Cannibalism.
