= Japanese occupation of the Solomon Islands =

Part of World War II

Solomon Islands ソロモン諸島 Soromon-shotō
- 1941–1945
- Flag Imperial Seal
- Status: Military occupation by the Empire of Japan
- Common languages: Japanese; Pijin
- Historical era: World War II
  - Occupation of Solomon: 9 December 1941
  - Battle of Guadalcanal begins: 7 August 1942
  - Occupation ends: 8 September 1945
Preceded by	Succeeded by
British Solomon Islands; Territory of New Guinea	British Solomon Islands; Territory of New Guinea
- Today part of: Solomon Islands and Bougainville

The Japanese occupation of the Solomon Islands was the period in the history of Solomon Islands between 1942 and 1945 when Imperial Japanese forces occupied Solomon Islands during World War II.

From 1942 to 1943, and even in some islands till 1945, Imperial Japanese Army forces occupied the Solomon Islands, then a part of the protectorate of the British Solomon Islands.

The Solomon Islands campaign was a major campaign of the Pacific War of World War II. The campaign began with Japanese landings and occupation of several areas in the British Solomon Islands and Bougainville Island, in the Territory of New Guinea, during the first six months of 1942. The Japanese occupied these islands and began the construction of several naval and air bases with the goals of protecting the flank of the Japanese offensive in New Guinea, establishing a security barrier for the major Japanese base at Rabaul on New Britain, and providing bases for interdicting supply lines.

== Northern Solomon Islands ==
These islands were part of the Australian Territory of New Guinea, a League of Nations mandate since 1920. Anchoring its defensive positions in the South Pacific was the major Japanese army and navy base at Rabaul, New Britain, which had been captured from the Australians in January 1942. In March and April, Japanese forces occupied and began constructing an airfield at Buka Island in northern Bougainville, as well as an airfield and naval base at Buin, in southern Bougainville.

== British Solomon Islands ==
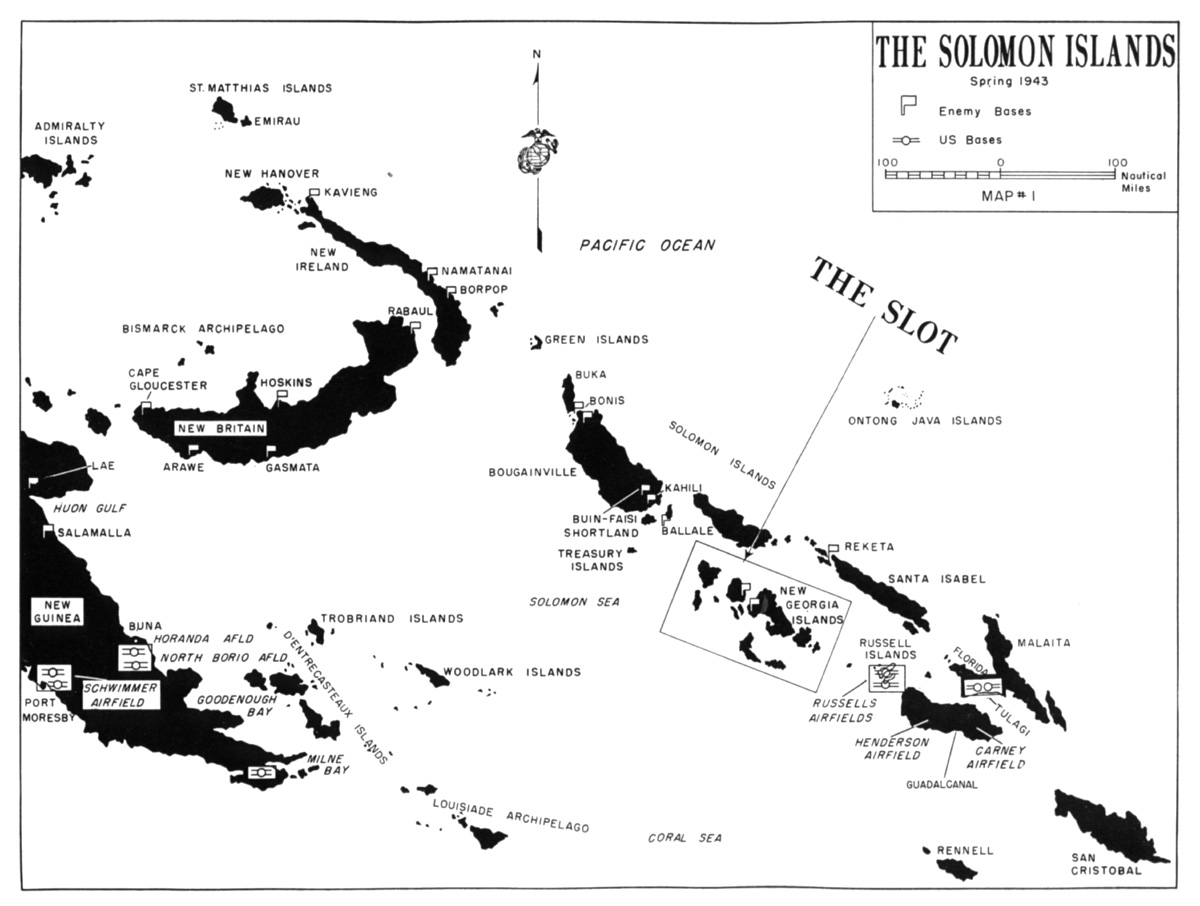
War map of the Solomon Islands

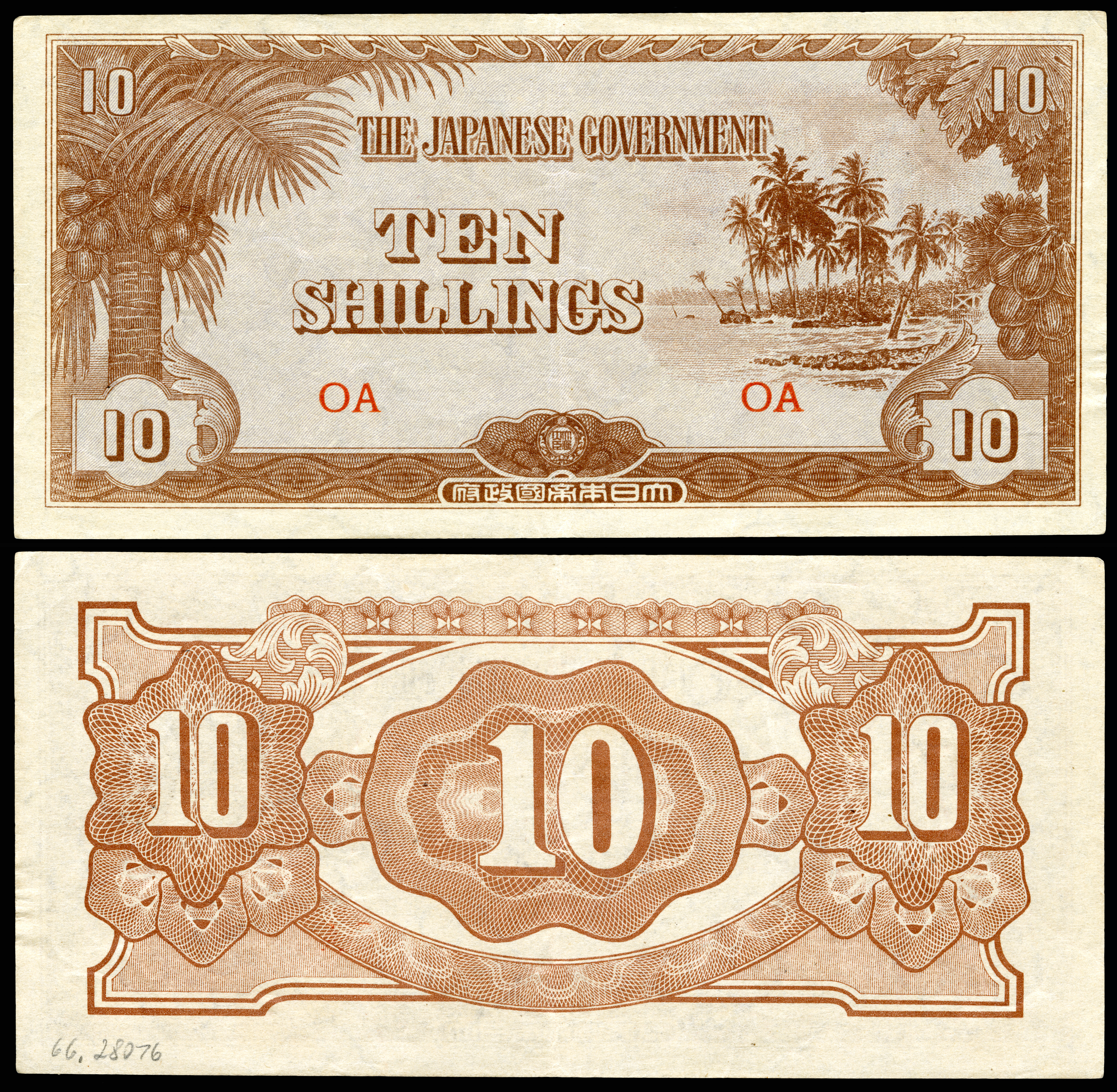
10 shillings of the Japanese occupation currency, 1942

== Japanese commanders ==
Both commanding the Seventeenth Army, from Bougainville:

- 1942–1945: Harukichi Hyakutake (b. 1888 – d. 1947)
- 1945 – 5 Sep 1945: Masatane Kanda (b. 1890 – d. 1983)

— Kanda surrendered Japanese forces on Bougainville Island to Allied commanders on 8 September 1945.

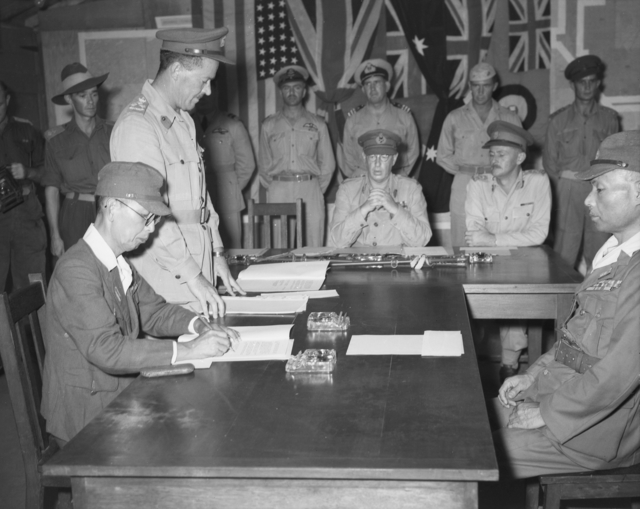
Masatane Kanda (left seated) surrenders Japanese forces on Bougainville to Allied commanders on September 8, 1945

  - Japanese occupation ends on the Solomon Islands in September 1945.

== See also ==
- Pacific Islands home front during World War II.
- Solomon Islands campaign
- Japanese government–issued Oceanian pound
