= East Isabel/Savo constituency =

East Isabel/Savo
- Former Single-member constituency for the Legislative Assembly of the Solomon Islands
- Region: Isabel Province

Former constituency
- Created: 1973
- Abolished: 1976
- Created from: Ngella/Savo/Russells & Santa Isabel
- Replaced by: East Isabel & Russells/Savo

East Isabel/Savo was a single-member constituency of the Governing Council and Legislative Assembly of the Solomon Islands between 1973 and 1976. Covering eastern Santa Isabel Island and Savo Island, it replaced the Ngella/Savo/Russells and Santa Isabel constituencies, and was succeeded by East Isabel (in which its sole MP Francis Reginald Kikolo was re-elected) and Russells/Savo.

== List of MPs ==
Term	MP	Party
1973–1976	Francis Reginald Kikolo	

== Election results ==
=== 1973 ===
1973 general election
Candidate	Party	Votes
Francis Reginald Kikolo		628
Daniel Denys Maile		526
Wilson Sungi		394
Alfred Charles Bugoro		318
Invalid/blank votes		
Total		1,866
Registered voters		
Source: Election Passport
