= East Isabel constituency =

East Isabel
- Former Single-member constituency for the National Parliament of the Solomon Islands
- Region: Isabel Province

Former constituency
- Created: 1976
- Abolished: 1993
- Created from: East Isabel/Savo
- Replaced by: Gao/Bugotu & Maringe/Kokota

East Isabel was a single-member constituency of the Legislative Assembly and National Parliament of Solomon Islands between 1976 and 1993. Located on Santa Isabel Island, it replaced the East Isabel/Savo constituency, and was succeeded by Gao/Bugotu (in which its final MP Nathaniel Supa was re-elected) and Maringe/Kokota.

== List of MPs ==
| Term | MP | Party |
|---|---|---|
| 1976–1980 | Francis Reginald Kikolo | |
| 1980–1984 | Michael Evo | |
| 1984–1989 | Nathaniel Supa | |
| 1989–1993 | Nathaniel Supa | |

== Election results ==
=== 1989 ===
1989 general election
| Candidate | Party | Votes |
|---|---|---|
| Nathaniel Supa | | 781 |
| Michael Evo | | 694 |
| Culwick Maneguasa Vahia | | 531 |
| Lonsdale Manase | | 184 |
| Jayson Luguhavi | | 158 |
| Michael Devis | | 75 |
| Joseph Bogese | | 60 |
| Invalid/blank votes | | |
| Total | | 2,483 |
| Registered voters | | 3,236 |
Source: Election Passport

=== 1984 ===
1984 general elections
| Candidate | Party | Votes |
|---|---|---|
| Nathaniel Supa | | 1,008 |
| Michael Evo | | 813 |
| Rex Bogese | | 235 |
| Invalid/blank votes | | |
| Total | | 2,056 |
| Registered voters | | |
Source: Election Passport

=== 1980 ===
1980 general election
| Candidate | Party | Votes |
|---|---|---|
| Michael Evo | | 586 |
| Culwick Maneguasa Vahia | | 294 |
| Z. Takonene | | 209 |
| Francis Reginald Kikolo | | 184 |
| N. Legua | | 172 |
| M. Manesonia | | 158 |
| J. Aujare | | 120 |
| T. Quity | | 99 |
| Invalid/blank votes | | |
| Total | | 1,822 |
| Registered voters | | 2,470 |
Source: Election Passport

=== 1976 ===
1976 general election
| Candidate | Party | Votes |
|---|---|---|
| Francis Reginald Kikolo | | 444 |
| Douglas Feitei | | 327 |
| Daniel Denys Maile | | 262 |
| Moses Mahomed Razak | | 249 |
| Cullwick Maneguasa Vahia | | 145 |
| Benjamin Tivo Zeva | | 120 |
| Alfred Charles Bugoro | | 105 |
| Invalid/blank votes | | |
| Total | | 1,652 |
| Registered voters | | |
Source: Election Passport
