= Choiseul constituency =

Choiseul
- Former single-member constituency for the Legislative Assembly of the Solomon Islands
- Region: Choiseul Province

Former constituency
- Created: 1973
- Abolished: 1976
- Created from: Choiseul/Shortlands
- Replaced by: North Choiseul & South Choiseul

Choiseul was a single-member constituency of the Governing Council and Legislative Assembly of the Solomon Islands. Created in 1973 when the Governing Council was expanded from 17 to 24 seats, it covered Choiseul Island, replacing the former Choiseul/Shortlands constituency.

In the 1973 elections the seat was won by Gideon Zoleveke. It was abolished in 1976 and succeeded by North Choiseul (in which Zoleveke was re-elected) and South Choiseul.

== List of MPs ==
| Term | MP | Party |
|---|---|---|
| 1973–1976 | Gideon Zoleveke | |

== Election results ==
=== 1973 ===
1973 general election
| Candidate | Party | Votes |
|---|---|---|
| Gideon Zoleveke | | 690 |
| Franklin Pitakaka | | 318 |
| Allan Qurusu | | 263 |
| Binet Gadebeta | | 192 |
| Benjamin Robinson | | 81 |
| Peter Qorovuku | | 63 |
| Total | | 1,607 |
| Registered voters | | |
Source: Election Passport
