= Jimson Fiau Tanangada =

Solomon Islands politician

Minister of Police, National Security and Correctional Services
- Incumbent
- Assumed office 6 May 2024

Personal details
- Spouse: Lanelle Tanangada

Jimson Fiau Tanangada is a Solomon Islands Member of Parliament (MP) who currently serves as the Minister of Police, National Security and Correctional Services. Tanangada previously served as the Minister for Rural Development and is the current president of the Ownership, Unity and Responsibility (OUR) party.

Prior to his political career he worked as a school teacher at a Kolombangara high school.

He is married to Lanelle Tanangada.

== Political career ==
Tanangada was first elected to parliament in 2014 as the MP for Gizo Kolombangara constituency in Western Province. He was subsequently appointed as Minister for Rural Development in 2014.

On 30 November 2017, he was removed from his position as an MP following a High Court ruling that he had bribed voters during the 2014 national elections. He was replaced by his wife, Lanelle Tanangada.

In the April 2024 national election, Tanangada was again elected as MP for Gizo Kolombangara. He was subsequently appointed as Minister of Police, National Security and Correctional Services on 6 May 2024. A position he continues to hold today.

== Controversies ==
Two months prior to the 2024 Solomons national election, Tanangada and Brandt Sogavare (son of then finance minister Manasseh Sogavare) were reported to have established a Singapore-based shell company, Our International Development Fund Pte Ltd.
