= Gizo/Kolombangara constituency =

Constituency of the Solomon Islands Parliament

Gizo/Kolombangara
- Single-member constituency for the National Parliament of the Solomon Islands
- Region: Western Province

Current constituency
- Created: 1976
- Created from: Gizo/Ranongga/ Simbo/Kolombangara
- Current MP: Lanelle Tanangada
- Party: Kadere Party

Gizo/Kolombangara is a single-member constituency of the National Parliament of Solomon Islands. Located in Western Province and covering Gizo and Kolombangara, it was established in 1976 when the Legislative Assembly was expanded from 24 to 38 seats, with the Gizo/Ranongga/Simbo/Kolombangara constituency split into Gizo/Kolombangara and Ranongga/Simbo. Former Gizo/Ranongga/Simbo/Kolombangara MP George Ngumi contested the seat in the 1976 elections, but was defeated by Lawry Eddie Wickham.

== List of MPs ==
Term	MP	Party
1976–1984	Lawry Eddie Wickham	
1980–1984	Lawry Eddie Wickham	
1984–1989	George Ngumi	
1984–1989	Joini Tutua	
1989–1993	Jackson Piasi	
1993–1997	Jackson Piasi	
1997–2001	Jackson Piasi	
2001–2006	Gordon Darcy Lilo	
2006–2010	Gordon Darcy Lilo	
2010–2014	Gordon Darcy Lilo	Party for Rural Advancement
2014–2018	Jimson Fiau Tanangada	United Democratic Party
2019–2024	Lanelle Olandrea Tanangada	Kadere Party
2024-	Jimson Fiau Tanangada	Ownership, Unity and Responsibility Party

== Election results ==
=== 2019 ===
2019 general election
Candidate	Party	Votes
Lanelle Olandrea Tanangada	Kadere Party	4,397
Gordon Darcy Llio	Party for Rural Advancement	4,002
John Hopa	Independent	103
Invalid/blank votes		30
Total		8,532
Registered voters		10,527
Source: Solomon Islands Electoral Commission

=== 2014 ===
2014 general election
Candidate	Party	Votes
Jimson Fiau Tanangada	United Democratic Party	2,143
Gordon Darcy Lilo	Party for Rural Advancement	1,901
Kenneth Bule Hite		1,093
Schulte Maetoloa		43
Invalid/blank votes		182
Total		5,362
Registered voters		
Source: Election Passport

=== 2010 ===
2010 general election
Candidate	Party	Votes
Gordon Darcy Lilo	Party for Rural Advancement	1,942
Kenneth Bule Hite	Ownership, Unity and Responsibility Party	905
Daniel Kennedy		520
Warren Paia		342
Mockson Aaron		307
Jackson Piasi		140
George Tataio		123
Ernest Kenji Sato		120
Robins Mesepitu		115
Mark Kale		101
Reuben Lilo		65
Ian Roni Gina		41
Ishmelly Kevu		31
Komoe Toma		30
Invalid/blank votes		116
Total		4,898
Registered voters		9,078
Source: Election Passport

=== 2006 ===
2006 general election
Candidate	Party	Votes
Gordon Darcy Lilo		1,810
Chachabule Amoi		726
Stephen Suti-Agalo		519
Jackson Piasi		408
Vainga Taniera Tion		323
Demetrius Tarabangara Piziki		143
Invalid/blank votes		33
Total		3,962
Registered voters		7,628
Source: Election Passport

=== 2001 ===
2001 general election
Candidate	Party	Votes
Gordon Darcy Lilo		985
Jackson Piasi		611
Daniel Kennedy		585
John Kabalo		558
Noah Zala		338
Clement Domonic Tebaia		279
Warren Paia		193
Iabeta Beneteti		98
Robert Moses Zutu		89
Invalid/blank votes		
Total		3,736
Registered voters		6,869
Source: Election Passport

=== 1997 ===
1997 general election
Candidate	Party	Votes
Jackson Piasi		794
Eric Havea		672
Arthur Kovara Unusu		543
Ben Ta'ake		362
Paul Oge		171
George Ngumi		128
Douglas Hiva		63
Invalid/blank votes		
Total		2,733
Registered voters		4,674
Source: Election Passport

=== 1993 ===
1993 general election
Candidate	Party	Votes
Jackson Piasi		884
Gordon Darcy Lilo		661
Chris Taboua		417
Emelio Bul		150
Nelson Toktok		136
Lawry Eddie Wickham		131
Eric Kikolo		125
Invalid/blank votes		
Total		2,504
Registered voters		4,048
Source: Election Passport

=== 1989 ===
1989 general election
Candidate	Party	Votes
Jackson Piasi		429
Joini Tutua		262
Chris Taboua		245
Lemech D. Qae		245
Warren Paia		163
Kenneth Vave		133
Etekia Avita		3
Invalid/blank votes		
Total		1,480
Registered voters		2,559
Source: Election Passport

=== 1985 ===
1985 by-election
Candidate	Party	Votes
Joini Tutua		521
George Ngumi		505
Chris Taboua		316
Aquila Talasasa		227
Franklin Pitakaka		147
Jackson Piasi		143
A. Bilikiki		38
Invalid/blank votes		1
Total		1,898
Registered voters		
Source: Election Passport

=== 1984 ===
1984 general election
Candidate	Party	Votes
George Ngumi		313
Joini Tutua		299
V. Lilo		150
Chris Taboua		103
Jackson Piasi		75
Francis Billy Hilly		62
Hugh Paia		30
Invalid/blank votes		
Total		1,032
Registered voters		
Source: Election Passport

=== 1980 ===
1980 general election
Candidate	Party	Votes
Lawry Eddie Wickham		401
Joini Tutua		275
K. Russell		193
D. Hivah		182
J. Qaqara		181
Invalid/blank votes		
Total		1,232
Registered voters		2,520
Source: Election Passport

=== 1976 ===
1976 general election
Candidate	Party	Votes
Lawry Eddie Wickham		410
George Ngumi		321
Aquila Talasasa		108
Anthony Ramoi		36
Invalid/blank votes		
Total		875
Registered voters		
Source: Election Passport
