= Rural Alliance Party =

The Rural Alliance Party (RAP) was a political party in the Solomon Islands.

== History ==
Following the 1976 elections opposition MPs formed the Coalition Opposition Group. When this disbanded later in the year, the Rural Party was formed by David Kausimae and Faneta Sira. It was later renamed the Rural Alliance Party.

After failing to gain significant influence in Parliament, it merged with the People's Progressive Party in 1979 to form the People's Alliance Party.
