= Burns Creek, Honiara =

Burns Creek
- Suburb
- Location in Guadalcanal
- Coordinates: 9°26′S 159°57′E
- Country: Solomon Islands
- Province: Honiara Town
- Island: Guadalcanal
- Elevation: 29 m (95 ft)

Population (2019)
  - Total: 5,000
- Time zone: UTC+11 (UTC)

Burns Creek is a suburb of Honiara, Solomon Islands located to the east of the main center, south of Lungga Point and west of Henderson. It was formed following the tensions over land when displaced Malaitans founded a squatted informal settlement in the late 1990s and early 2000s. The area became known for high levels of unemployment and crime.

Burns Creek as a suburb is outside of the Honiara City Council, and the creek itself forms the eastern boundary of the city council lands. It is a settlement area with many working-class people; crime rates have dropped substantially since 2010.
