= Silas Sitai =

Solomon Islands civil servant

Shadow Chairman of the Governing Council
- In office August 1971 – October 1972
- Preceded by: Tom Russell
- Succeeded by: Michael Gass

Personal details
- Died: 31 October 1972 (aged 52)

Silas Sitai MBE BEM (died 31 October 1972) was a Solomon Islands civil servant. He served as Shadow Chairman of the Governing Council between 1971 and 1972, the first Solomon Islander to hold the post.

== Biography ==
Originally from Santa Ana, Sitai attended All Hallows' School and Queen Victoria School in Fiji. He joined the civil service as a clerk in 1939, initially working in the Resident Commissioner's office in Tulagi. Having learnt morse code, he attended a training course in Suva to become a wireless operator. When World War II started he joined the Fiji Naval Reserve, before returning to serve in the BSIP Defence Force alongside the United States Marine Corps.

Following the war, Sitai returned to Suva to finish studying. He then came back to the Solomon Islands and rejoined the civil service, becoming a clerk in Eastern District. By 1954 he had become Assistant Administrative Assistant, and was awarded the British Empire Medal in the 1954 Birthday Honours. He transferred to Central District in 1958, before becoming the Public Service Officer on the Land Trust Board in 1962. Two years later he was appointed District Officer in Central District, before transferring to the same post for Isabel Island the following year. He also served as a magistrate, and was made an MBE in the 1970 Birthday Honours. In 1971 he was appointed Shadow Chairman of the Governing Council, becoming the first Speaker of the legislature.

Sitai retired from the civil service in July 1972. A heavy smoker, he died of a heart attack in October the same year.
