= Eastern Outer Islands constituency =

Former constituency in the Solomon Islands

Eastern Outer Islands
- Former Single-member constituency for the Legislative Assembly of the Solomon Islands

Former constituency
- Created: 1967
- Abolished: 1976
- Replaced by: First Eastern Outer Islands; Second Eastern Outer Islands

Eastern Outer Islands was a single-member constituency of the Legislative Council, Governing Council and Legislative Assembly of the Solomon Islands between 1967 and 1976. It was succeeded by the First and Second Eastern Outer Islands constituencies, with the constituency's final MP, Moffat Bonunga, re-elected in the First constituency.

== List of MPs ==
| Term | MP | Party |
|---|---|---|
| 1967–1970 | Edmond Kiva | |
| 1970–1973 | TAC Hepwerth | |
| 1973–1976 | Moffat Bonunga | |

== Election results ==
=== 1973 ===
1973 general election
| Candidate | Party | Votes |
|---|---|---|
| Moffat Bonunga | | 1,001 |
| John Melanoli | | 503 |
| Shadrach Sade | | 199 |
| John Palusi | | 176 |
| David Dawea Taukalo | | 101 |
| Invalid/blank votes | | |
| Total | | 1,980 |
| Registered voters | | |
Source: Election Passport

=== 1970 ===
1970 general election
| Candidate | Party | Votes |
|---|---|---|
| TAC Hepwerth | | |
| P Bagira | | |
| David Dawea Taukalo | | |
| Jason Melake | | |
| Invalid/blank votes | | |
| Total | | |
| Registered voters | | 2,851 |
Source: Election Passport

=== 1967 ===
The 1967 elections were carried out using an electoral college.

1967 general election
| Candidate | Party | Votes |
|---|---|---|
| Edmond Kiva | | |
| Jason Melake | | |
| Ishmael Mark Tuki | | |
| Invalid/blank votes | | |
| Total | | |
| Registered voters | | |
Source: Election Passport
