= Lilly Ogatina Poznanski =

Lilly Ogatina Valahoe Poznanski MBE (14 April 1942 – 14 June 1989) was a politician and educator from the Solomon Islands. She was the first woman to be elected to public office in the country. Poznanski was also the first Solomon Islands woman to be awarded an MBE and the Solomon Islands Independence Medal.

== Early life and education ==
Poznanski was born in Kia, Santa Isabel Island in 1942. Her father was George Rubaha, an Anglican preacher, and her mother's name was Lusuai. Poznanski was one of the first Solomon Islands women to be sent to study abroad by the government, and spent seven years studying in New Zealand.

== Career ==
On her return she taught at St. Hilda's School at Bungana.

Poznanski was elected to the Central Solomons seat in the Legislative Council on 7 April 1965, defeating four other candidates and becoming the first female elected representative in Solomon Islands. Poznanski stood unsuccessfully for the Honiara seat in the Legislative Council in 1967, and then resumed teaching at the Government Primary School in Honiara. In September 1969, she was elected to the Ngosi Ward of the Honiara Town Council. The following year she became Assistant Clerk to the Governing Council. In 1978, she became Chief Administrative Officer with the Ministry of Foreign Trade, Industry and Labour, and the most highly paid woman in the Solomons. In 1984, Poznanski unsuccessfully contested the West Isabel parliamentary seat.

Poznanski kept close links with her rural family and led her Zabana people in efforts to reconnect with their Logahaza origins, a link which had been disrupted in the late nineteenth century by raids and conflicts.

== Personal life ==
In 1966, she married Obiri Poznanski, a part-Polish part-Gilbertese member of staff of the Marine Department. They had four children together.
