= People's Progressive Party (Solomon Islands) =

The People's Progressive Party (PPP) was a political party in the Solomon Islands.

== History ==
The PPP was established in February 1974. It was initially led by Solomon Mamaloni and was estimated to have around six members of the Governing Council. Later in the year, an election was held for the first Chief Minister. Mamaloni defeated Benedict Kinika of the United Solomon Islands Party and formed a cabinet of PPP members and independents. He resigned in November 1975 after an inquiry into action taken without consulting his cabinet, and when he was re-elected in December he formed a cabinet with five USIPA members, two from the PPP and one independent.

Following the formation of the new government and prior to the 1976 general elections, the PPP and USIPA both disintegrated. In 1979 it merged with the Rural Alliance Party to form the People's Alliance Party.

== 2001–2006 party ==
A party of the same name existed briefly from 2001 until 2006, led by Prime Minister Manasseh Sogavare. It contested the 2001 general election and won 3 seats.
