= 1967 Solomon Islands general election =

General elections were held in the Solomon Islands between mid-May and mid-June 1967.

== Background ==
At the time of the 1965 elections, the Legislative Council had 22 members; the Governor, 11 'official' members (civil servants) and 10 'unofficial' members, of which seven were elected by regional councils, two appointed by the Governor and one directly elected in Honiara.

Prior to the 1967 elections, the membership was increased to 29, with three ex officio members, twelve officials and fourteen elected members. Thirteen of the elected members were directly elected, whilst the Eastern Outer Islands seat was indirectly elected by an electoral college.

== Results ==
From a possible electorate of 64,033, only 39,101 people registered to vote, of which 17,689 voted (45%).

Constituency	Candidate	Votes	%	Notes
Central Malaita (Electorate: 2,645)	Peter Taloni	566	60.7	Elected
Central Malaita (Electorate: 2,645)	Arnon Atomea	202	21.7	
Central Malaita (Electorate: 2,645)	Robert Harold Gordon	121	13.0	
Central Malaita (Electorate: 2,645)	Abiather Anifela	44	4.7	
Central Malaita (Electorate: 2,645)	Total	933	100	
Central Solomons (Electorate: 2,727)	John Plant Hoka	646	38.8	Elected
Central Solomons (Electorate: 2,727)	Ronald Alexander Lawson	463	27.8	
Central Solomons (Electorate: 2,727)	Ben Duva Tonezepo	196	11.8	
Central Solomons (Electorate: 2,727)	Abiah Tegheta	195	11.7	
Central Solomons (Electorate: 2,727)	Erastus Baiave	105	6.3	
Central Solomons (Electorate: 2,727)	Baiabe Tekiou	29	1.7	
Central Solomons (Electorate: 2,727)	Kadmiel Tekieu	26	1.6	
Central Solomons (Electorate: 2,727)	Alick Tehatinga	6	0.4	
Central Solomons (Electorate: 2,727)	Total	1,666	100	
Eastern Outer Islands (Electoral college)	Edmond Kiva			Elected
Eastern Outer Islands (Electoral college)	Jason Melake			
Eastern Outer Islands (Electoral college)	Ishmael Mark Tuki			
Eastern Outer Islands (Electoral college)	Total			
Honiara (Electorate: 1,233)	Bill Ramsay	211	54.4	Elected
Honiara (Electorate: 1,233)	Bara Buchanan	157	40.5	
Honiara (Electorate: 1,233)	Lilly Ogatina Poznanski	20	5.2	Unseated
Honiara (Electorate: 1,233)	Total	388	100	
Makira (Electorate: 3,263)	Jack Campbell	—	—	Re-elected unopposed
New Georgia (Electorate: 3,638)	John Wesley Kere	763	32.0	Elected
New Georgia (Electorate: 3,638)	Belshazzar Gina	652	27.4	
New Georgia (Electorate: 3,638)	George Pina Lilo	520	21.8	
New Georgia (Electorate: 3,638)	John Frederick Schenk	224	9.4	
New Georgia (Electorate: 3,638)	Waldrip Arthur Viva	132	5.5	
New Georgia (Electorate: 3,638)	Don Alley Riqeo	91	3.8	
New Georgia (Electorate: 3,638)	Total	2,382	100	
North Central Malaita (Electorate: 2,128)	Peter Kerr Thompson	579	65.1	Elected
North Central Malaita (Electorate: 2,128)	Lucius Noi	258	29.0	Unseated
North Central Malaita (Electorate: 2,128)	Nelson Kifo	52	5.8	
North Central Malaita (Electorate: 2,128)	Total	889	100	
North East Malaita (Electorate: 2,108)	Mariano Kelesi	615	70.4	Re-elected
North East Malaita (Electorate: 2,108)	Johnson Siota	151	17.3	
North East Malaita (Electorate: 2,108)	Daniel Laulifoia	56	6.4	
North East Malaita (Electorate: 2,108)	Casper Sade	52	5.9	
North East Malaita (Electorate: 2,108)	Total	874	100	
North Guadalcanal (Electorate: 3,582)	Baddlly Devesi	1,200	74.7	Elected
North Guadalcanal (Electorate: 3,582)	Michael Rapasia	143	8.9	Unseated
North Guadalcanal (Electorate: 3,582)	Matthew Belamataga	108	6.7	
North Guadalcanal (Electorate: 3,582)	Patterson Gatu	92	5.7	
North Guadalcanal (Electorate: 3,582)	William Norman Tasker	45	2.8	
North Guadalcanal (Electorate: 3,582)	James Bosa	19	1.2	
North Guadalcanal (Electorate: 3,582)	Total	1,607	100	
North Malaita (Electorate: 1,792)	Clement Kiriau Ofai	388	49.2	Elected
North Malaita (Electorate: 1,792)	Jotham Ausuta	295	37.4	
North Malaita (Electorate: 1,792)	Lemuel Liolea	105	13.3	
North Malaita (Electorate: 1,792)	Total	788	100	
North Western Solomons (Electorate: 4,278)	Gordon Siama	1,595	59.1	Elected
North Western Solomons (Electorate: 4,278)	John Macdonald	407	15.1	Unseated
North Western Solomons (Electorate: 4,278)	Remesio Eresi	311	11.5	
North Western Solomons (Electorate: 4,278)	Vailini Barisakapa	98	3.6	
North Western Solomons (Electorate: 4,278)	Orisanto Otuana	86	3.2	
North Western Solomons (Electorate: 4,278)	Jonathan Taneko	69	2.6	
North Western Solomons (Electorate: 4,278)	Jason Dorovolomo	66	2.4	
North Western Solomons (Electorate: 4,278)	Patrick Paia	65	2.4	
North Western Solomons (Electorate: 4,278)	Total	2,697	100	
South Guadalcanal (Electorate: 2,835)	Leone Laku	520	40.3	Elected
South Guadalcanal (Electorate: 2,835)	Gordon Billy Gatu	483	37.4	
South Guadalcanal (Electorate: 2,835)	Marcus Pipisi	184	14.3	
South Guadalcanal (Electorate: 2,835)	Romano Vaolu	103	8.0	
South Guadalcanal (Electorate: 2,835)	Total	1,290	100	
South Malaita (Electorate: 3,234)	David Kausimae	1,382	71.5	Re-elected
South Malaita (Electorate: 3,234)	Emilio Idi	370	19.2	
South Malaita (Electorate: 3,234)	George Garnet	180	9.3	
South Malaita (Electorate: 3,234)	Total	1,932	100	
Ysabel/Russells (Electorate: 3,454)	Willie Betu	1,810	80.7	Elected
Ysabel/Russells (Electorate: 3,454)	George Tekinaiti Tokatake	180	8.0	
Ysabel/Russells (Electorate: 3,454)	Ernest Tada Huinodi	125	5.6	
Ysabel/Russells (Electorate: 3,454)	Hugo Kolitevo	70	3.1	
Ysabel/Russells (Electorate: 3,454)	Ellison Oliver	35	1.6	
Ysabel/Russells (Electorate: 3,454)	William Loslie Miki	23	1.0	
Ysabel/Russells (Electorate: 3,454)	Total	2,243	100	
Source: Wood, Election Passport
