= Allan Kemakeza =

Prime Minister of Solomon Islands (2001–2006)

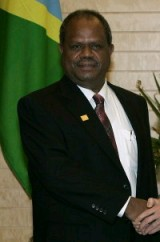
- Kemakeza in 2005

Prime Minister of Solomon Islands
- In office 17 December 2001 – 20 April 2006
- Monarch: Elizabeth II
- Governors-General: John Lapli; Nathaniel Waena
- Preceded by: Manasseh Sogavare
- Succeeded by: Snyder Rini

Personal details
- Born: 11 September 1950 (age 76) Panueli, British Solomon Islands (today in Central Province, Solomon Islands)
- Party: People's Alliance Party

Allan Kemakeza (born 11 September 1950) was the prime minister of Solomon Islands from 2001 to 2006. He represented Savo/Russel Constituency in the National Parliament of Solomon Islands from 1989 to 2010 and was most recently Minister of Forestry December 2007 to August 2010. He served as Speaker of the National Parliament, from September 2010 to 2014.

== Overview ==
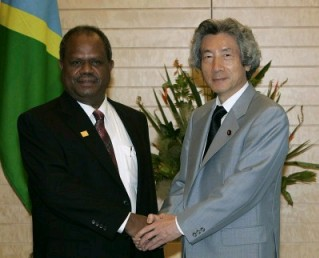
with Jun'ichirō Koizumi (at the Prime Minister's Official Residence on 11 July 2005)

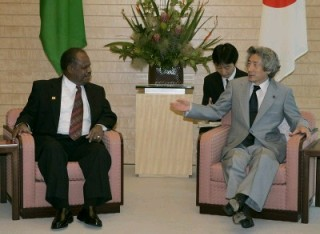
with Jun'ichirō Koizumi (at the Prime Minister's Official Residence on 11 July 2005)

Kemakeza was born on the island of Savo. He joined the police force in 1972 and served in various positions until he resigned in December 1988 in order to stand in the 1989 parliamentary election. He won a seat from Savo/Russel in that election, and in 1989, he was also appointed Minister for Police and Justice, serving in that position until 1990. From 1991 to 1993, he served as Minister for Housing and Government Services; he was re-elected in the May 1993 election and was Deputy Leader of the Opposition from 1993 to 1994. He was Minister for Forests, Environment & Conservation from 1995 to 1996. Re-elected to Parliament in the August 1997 election, he became Deputy Leader of the Opposition again in that year.

In June 2000, Kemakeza was appointed as Deputy Prime Minister and Minister for National Unity, Reconciliation and Peace under Prime Minister Manasseh Sogavare. In August 2001, Kemakeza was sacked from these positions by Sogavare following allegations of corruption. Further controversy surfaced when he received SI$850,000 as part of a program compensating individuals who lost property during the Civil War. Kemakeza denies the allegations of corruption.

His People's Alliance Party won 20 of 49 seats in the parliamentary election of 5 December 2001, becoming the largest party in parliament. He was elected as prime minister by Parliament on 17 December 2001 in the first round of voting, receiving 29 votes out of the 50 seats in parliament, and sworn in on 19 December 2001.

Before he became prime minister, there was much turmoil in Solomon Islands because of rivalry between militias from the various islands, which reached its height in June 2000, when a coup took place. Problems still continue today, but Kemakeza's government allowed the international community, including peacekeepers, to help solve the problems.

An Australian-led peace-keeping force named RAMSI (Regional Assistance Mission to Solomon Islands) is in place, based in Honiara. He has attracted some controversy through his 2005 visit to Japan's Yasukuni War Shrine, which honours Japanese WWII combatants and 14 convicted war criminals.

Kemakeza remained in office through a full four-year parliamentary term, a distinguishing feat in Solomon Islands politics; he survived three motions of no confidence during the term. At the end of the parliamentary term in December 2005, Parliament was dissolved and Kemakeza and his Cabinet served in a caretaker capacity until the next election, which was held on 5 April 2006. In this election, Kemakeza's People's Alliance Party lost more than 10 seats; Kemakeza himself was re-elected to his seat. Kemakeza soon announced his resignation as prime minister, but one of his allies, Deputy Prime Minister Snyder Rini, was elected to succeed him. Kemakeza was appointed leader of the governing coalition and it seemed that he would still have much power within the government. His term as prime minister was to end on 19 April, but he remained in office until the following day because of riots over Rini's controversial election. He became Deputy Speaker of the National Parliament on 24 April 2006, having been elected with 25 votes from the members of the 50-seat Parliament.

In early November 2007, Kemakaza was convicted of demanding money with menace, intimidation and larceny in connection with a raid that he allegedly ordered in May 2002 on a law firm, Sol Law, in Honiara. The raid was allegedly an attempt to drive the firm's Australian lawyers, who Kemakeza thought held too much influence over national financial institutions, out of Solomon Islands. He faced a potential prison sentence as a result of the conviction. After the conviction, it was reported that he discussed a deal with Sogavare's government for a pardon. The government claimed that Kemakeza had left the opposition and was named as the chairman of the board of the Solomon Islands Water Authority, but Kemakeza denied this and said that he was not making a deal. In December, Kemakeza, having previously been neutral, backed the opposition led by Fred Fono; soon afterward, Sogavare's government was defeated in a no-confidence vote. Kemakeza eventually served a five-month prison sentence in 2008.

Following Sogavare's defeat, Kemakeza became Minister of Forestry under Prime Minister Derek Sikua on 22 December 2007, leaving the post of Deputy Speaker on that date.

He lost his seat, and Cabinet position, in the August 2010 general election. He then announced he was a candidate for the position of Speaker of the National Parliament, to be chosen from outside Parliament. Two other former MPs, who had likewise lost their seat in the 2010 election, Francis Billy Hilly and Fred Fono, also stood for the job of Speaker. Kemakeza was elected by Parliament with 27 votes, to 17 for Billy Hilly and 4 for Fono.

== Honours ==
- Knight Bachelor (16 June 2001 – 23 December 2016)
- Order of Brilliant Star with Special Grand Cordon Taiwan (January 2006) Award Announced
