= 1970 Solomon Islands general election =

General elections were held in the Solomon Islands in May and June 1970, the first to the new Governing Council. Most candidates ran as independents.

== Background ==
The new Governing Council consisted of seventeen elected members (increased from fourteen in the Legislative Council), six civil servants (down from twelve) and three ex officio members, the first time a Solomon Islands legislature had an elected majority. The Council was to be chaired by the High Commissioner.

Rather than introducing cabinet government, the new constitution provided for government by committee, which was deemed more in line with Melanesian culture of reaching agreement by consensus rather than majority vote. The Governing Council had five committees, which were responsible for Communications and Works, Education and Social Welfare, Finance, Health and Internal Affairs, and Natural Resources.

== Results ==
Constituency	Candidate	Votes	%	Notes
Central Malaita	Jonathan Fiifii'i	613	36.47	Elected
Central Malaita	Daniel Foasifobae	442	26.29	
Central Malaita	Peter Taloni	284	16.89	Unseated
Central Malaita	Nelson Kifo	173	10.29	
Central Malaita	Calisto Kobiloko	169	10.05	
Central Malaita	Total	1,681	100	
Choiseul/Shortlands	Remesio Eresi	778	36.36	Elected
Choiseul/Shortlands	Binet Gadebeta	520	24.30	
Choiseul/Shortlands	Moses Puibangara Pitakaka	506	23.64	
Choiseul/Shortlands	John Macdonald	173	8.08	
Choiseul/Shortlands	Jason Dorovolomo	163	7.62	
Choiseul/Shortlands	Total	2,140	100	
East Guadalcanal	Leone Laku	442	37.94	Re-elected
East Guadalcanal	Joseph Bryan	422	36.22	
East Guadalcanal	Joel Kikolo	146	12.53	
East Guadalcanal	David Valusa	89	7.64	
East Guadalcanal	William Norman Tasker	66	5.67	
East Guadalcanal	Total	1,165	100	
Eastern Outer Islands	David Dawea Taukalo			Elected by electoral college
Eastern Outer Islands	P Bagira			
Eastern Outer Islands	TAC Hepwerth			
Eastern Outer Islands	Jason Melake			
Eastern Outer Islands	Total			
Honiara	Peter Salaka	874	57.92	Elected
Honiara	Peter Kenilorea	327	21.67	
Honiara	Peter Smith	308	20.41	
Honiara	Total	1,509	100	
Makira	Solomon Mamaloni	1,286	46.95	Elected
Makira	Geoffrey Kuper	1,280	46.73	
Makira	Nathaniel Rahumae Waena	173	6.32	
Makira	Total	2,739	100	
New Georgia	Samuel Kuku	1,154	55.37	Elected
New Georgia	Frank Wickham	624	29.94	
New Georgia	George Pina Lilo	247	11.85	
New Georgia	Aaron Ben	59	2.83	
New Georgia	Total	2,084	100	
Ngella/Savo/Russells	Edmond Kiva	1,054	55.50	Elected
Ngella/Savo/Russells	Cecil Wilson Maneau	456	24.01	
Ngella/Savo/Russells	Silas Niavuni	213	11.22	
Ngella/Savo/Russells	John Plant Hoka	176	9.27	Unseated
Ngella/Savo/Russells	Total	1,899	100	
North Central Malaita	Peter Kerr Thompson	1,441	71.23	Re-elected
North Central Malaita	John Maetia Kaliuae	582	28.77	
North Central Malaita	Total	2,023	100	
North East Malaita	Mariano Kelesi	899	66.74	Re-elected
North East Malaita	Dudley Kiriau	448	33.26	
North East Malaita	Total	1,347	100	
North Malaita	Clement Kiriau Ofai	657	59.35	Re-elected
North Malaita	Jotham Ausuta	450	40.65	
North Malaita	Total	1,107	100	
Santa Isabel	Willie Betu	1,423	72.53	Re-elected
Santa Isabel	Daniel Denys Maile	539	27.47	
Santa Isabel	Total	1,962	100	
South Central Malaita	David Kausimae	1,552	91.08	Re-elected
South Central Malaita	Eliel Ahikau	152	8.92	
South Central Malaita	Total	1,704	100	
South Guadalcanal	George Pugeva	—	—	Elected unopposed
South Malaita	Anthony Saru	544	41.24	Elected
South Malaita	Aziel Laealaha	489	37.07	
South Malaita	George Garnet	286	21.68	
South Malaita	Total	1,319	100	
Vella Lavella/Kolombangara	Gordon Siama	938	45.51	Elected
Vella Lavella/Kolombangara	Belshazzar Gina	507	24.60	
Vella Lavella/Kolombangara	Bruce Ragoso	380	18.44	
Vella Lavella/Kolombangara	George Talasasa	236	11.45	
Vella Lavella/Kolombangara	Total	2,061	100	
West Guadalcanal	Alfred Maeke	465	31.61	Elected
West Guadalcanal	Bara Buchanan	345	23.45	
West Guadalcanal	David Thuguvoda	337	22.91	
West Guadalcanal	Matthew Belamataga	324	22.03	
West Guadalcanal	Total	1,471	100	
Registered voters/turnout		51,904		
Source: Social Science Research Network, Election Passport

=== Appointed members ===
Position		Member
Ex officio	Acting Chief Secretary	R. Davies
Ex officio	Attorney-General	D.R. Davis
Ex officio	Financial Secretary	J. H. Smith
Official	Commissioner of Labour	B.C. Wilmot
Official	Commissioner of Lands and Surveys	J.B. Twomney
Official	Director of Agriculture	F.M. Spenser
Official	Director of Education	A.G.H. House
Official	Director of Medical Services	J.D. Macgregor
Official	Director of Public Works	W.A. Wood
Source: Solomons Encyclopaedia

== Aftermath ==
The newly elected Council met for the first time on 15 July. Gordon Siama was appointed chair of the Communications and Works committee, Willie Betu became chair of the Education and Social Welfare committee, Tom Russell (Financial Secretary) became chair of the Finance committee, Roy Davies was appointed chair of the Health and Internal Affairs committee, and David Kausimae became chair of the Natural Resources committee.

Joseph Bryan, who lost by 20 votes in East Guadalcanal, lodged a petition against the election results, claiming that the votes cast at two polling stations had been rejected as they contained markings that could identify the voter. The High Court heard the petition on 10 August; with the Returning Officer and winning candidate Leone Laku failing to lodge objections, the court annulled the result and ordered a by-election to be held. The by-election took place on 10 October, with Bryan winning with 977 votes; Laku finished second with 362.

In 1971 Silas Sitai was appointed 'shadow chairman', becoming the first Speaker of the legislature.
