= Governing Council of the Solomon Islands =

The Governing Council (GovCo) was the legislature and executive of the Solomon Islands between 1970 and 1974.

== History ==
The Governing Council was established in 1970 when a new constitution was promulgated on 10 April. It combined the previous Legislative Council and Executive Council into a single body. For the first time, elected members were in the majority, having increased in number from 14 to 17. The GovCo consisted of 17 elected members, nine appointed government officials and the High Commissioner, who served as Chairman.

The Council had six committees; Communications, Finance, Internal Affairs, Natural Resources, Social Services and Works. The elected members were elected from single-member constituencies for four-year terms. The first elections took place in 1970. Prior to the 1973 elections the number of elected members and constituencies was increased to 24.

On 27 August 1974 a new constitution was promulgated, abolishing the Governing Council and replacing it with an all-elected 38-member Legislative Assembly, which was elected for the first time in 1976. This was in preparation for independence in 1978 when it became, effectively, the National Parliament of Solomon Islands.

== List of constituencies ==
| 1970 constituencies | 1973 constituencies |
|---|---|
| Central Malaita | ꞌAreꞌare |
| Choiseul/Shortlands | Central Guadalcanal |
| East Guadalcanal | Central Malaita |
| Eastern Outer Islands | Choiseul |
| Honiara | East Guadalcanal |
| Makira | East Isabel/Savo |
| New Georgia | East Makira |
| Ngella/Savo/Russells | East Malaita |
| North Central Malaita | Eastern Outer Islands |
| North East Malaita | Gizo/Ranongga/Simbo/Kolombangara |
| North Malaita | Honiara |
| Santa Isabel | Kwaio |
| South Central Malaita | Lau/Mbaelelea |
| South Guadalcanal | Marovo/Kusaghe |
| South Malaita | Nggela |
| Vella Lavella/Kolombangara | North West Malaita |
| West Guadalcanal | Roviana/Rendova |
| | Shortlands/Vella Lavella |
Small Malaita
South Guadalcanal/Rennell and Bellona
West Guadalcanal and Russells
West Isabel
West Kwara'ae
West Makira
Source: Election Passport

== Chairmen of the Governing Council ==
| # | Name | Took office | Left office | Notes |
|---|---|---|---|---|
| 30 | Tom Russell | 1970 | August 1971 | Also acting High Commissioner |
| 31 | Silas Sitai | August 1971 | October 1972 | Died in office |
| 28 | Michael Gass | October 1972 | 1973 | Also High Commissioner |
| 29 | Donald Luddington | October 1973 | September 1974 | Also High Commissioner |
| 32 | Frederick Osifelo | September 1974 | October 1974 | |
