= Legislative Council of the Solomon Islands =

1960–1970 unicameral legislature

The Legislative Council (LegCo) was the legislature of the Solomon Islands between 1960 and 1970.

== History ==
The Legislative Council was created following the proclamation of the British Solomon Islands (Constitution) Order-in-Council, 1960 on 18 October 1960. It created a Council with 21 members, eleven of which were government officials and ten were nominees, of which six had to be Solomon Islanders.

Its first meeting was held in 1961 in Honiara Teachers' College Assembly Hall. In 1964 a new constitution was produced, introducing eight elected members to an enlarged 25-member Council alongside two nominees. However, only one of the eight members were directly-elected, with elections taking place in the Honiara constituency resulting in Eric Lawson becoming the first elected member. The other seven members were elected by electoral colleges formed by local councils, with three elected in Malaita District, two in Central District, and one from each of the Eastern and Western districts.

An Order-in-Council made by the Privy Council on 23 December 1966 increased the number of members to 29 and the number of elected members to 14 (although the Eastern Outer Islands constituency continued to use an electoral college), alongside fifteen government officials (the High Commissioner had the right to appoint two members, but did not). Elections were held the following year.

The Council was abolished when a new constitution was promulgated on 10 April, combining it with the Executive Council to form the Governing Council.

== Constituencies ==
Constituency
Central Malaita
Central Solomons
Eastern Outer Islands
Honiara
Makira
New Georgia
North Central Malaita
North East Malaita
North Guadalcanal
North Malaita
North Western Solomons
South Guadalcanal
South Malaita
Ysabel/Russells
