= Ronald Holmes =

British colonial administrator

Sir Ronald Holmes 何禮文爵士
- Born: David Ronald Holmes; 26 December 1913; United Kingdom
- Died: 14 June 1981 (aged 67); Corfu, Greece
- Occupation: Colonial government official

Sir David Ronald Holmes CMG CBE MC ED JP (Chinese: 何禮文爵士, 26 December 1913 – 14 June 1981) was a British colonial government official who served in Hong Kong from 1938 to 1977.

During the Second World War, he was assigned to the British Army Aid Group where he actively took part in a series of guerilla actions in the Far East to resist the Japanese Army and to rescue prisoners of war from Japanese detention camps. His contribution was recognised by the British government and he was decorated several times. After the war, Holmes played a significant role in the reconstruction of Hong Kong.

In 1954, he was appointed to establish the Resettlement Department, a government department responsible for building resettlement estates for homeless refugees. Later on, he successively served as Director of Urban Services, New Territories' District Commissioner and Director of Commerce and Industry.

In 1966, Holmes replaced John Crichton McDougall as Secretary for Chinese Affairs; not long after, the 1967 Leftist Riots broke out. During the riots, he was noted for taking control of the situation as acting-Colonial Secretary and adopting a hard-line policy towards the Communists.

In 1969, Holmes took up the post of Secretary for Home Affairs, serving in that role until 1971. He then became chairman of the Public Service Commission until 1977 when he left Hong Kong.

During Holmes' time with the government of Hong Kong, he was appointed an official member of the Urban Council, Legislative Council and Executive Council, serving in the Legislative Council for a decade in total. For his public service to Hong Kong, he was knighted in 1973.

== Biography ==
=== Early years ===
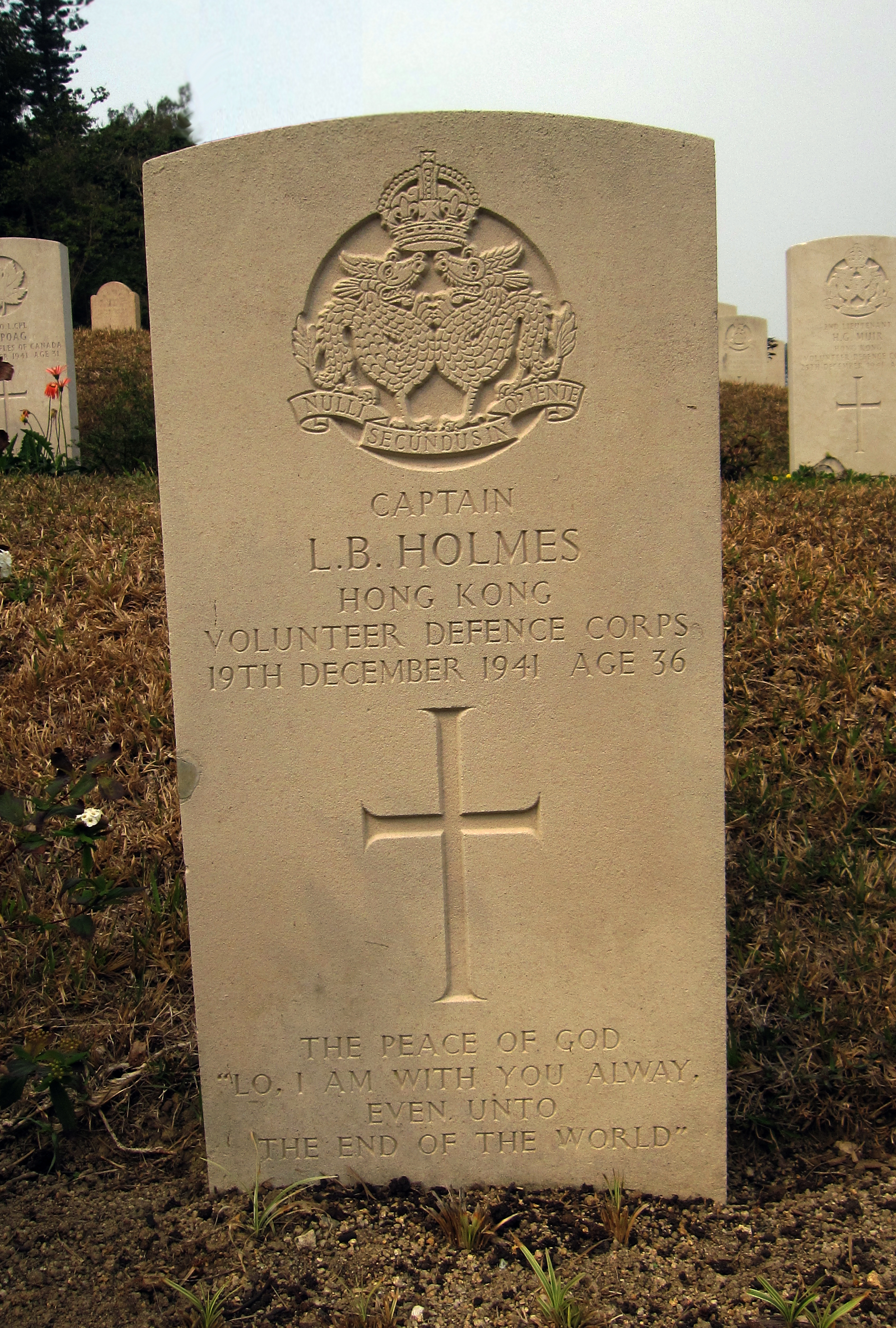
The headstone of Captain L. B. Holmes.

Holmes was born on 26 December 1913 in the United Kingdom. His parents were Louis James Holmes and Emily Sutcliffe of Brighouse, West Yorkshire. In his youth, he studied at Bradford Grammar School and later graduated from Sidney Sussex College, Cambridge. He once served as an Officer Cadet in the Senior Division of the Cambridge University Contingent and was promoted to the rank of Second Lieutenant in 1935. After the promotion, he briefly served in the Infantry Unit of the Contingent but retired in October 1936. In 1938, Holmes was employed by the government of Hong Kong as a cadet. Prior to the war, he was the Assistant Secretary for Chinese Affairs and learned to speak fluent Cantonese.

In December 1941, the Pacific War broke out and the Japanese Army initiated an unexpected invasion of Hong Kong. During the Battle of Hong Kong, Holmes fought with the British Forces Overseas Hong Kong but was soon transferred to the Special Operations Executive (SOE). His primary duty was to attack the Japanese army from the rear. Following the surrender of Hong Kong by Governor Sir Mark Young on 25 December, Holmes fled to mainland China, thus evading capture by Japanese troops. His only brother, Captain Leslie Benjamin Holmes (1905–1941) of the Hong Kong Volunteer Defence Corps, was killed in action in Hong Kong on 19 December. He died at the age of 36 and left his widow, Marguerite Julia Holmes, of Ramsbury, Wiltshire. Today, his grave can still be found in the Stanley Military Cemetery.

=== British Army Aid Group ===
After fleeing from Hong Kong, Holmes reached Chongqing in early 1942 to unite with British delegates in China. Later on, he was ordered to drive (later Sir) John Keswick, the First Secretary of the British Consulate-General in Chongqing, and the consulate's attaché, Brigadier Gordon Edward Grimsdale to Shaoguan, Guangdong for a special mission to discuss with General Yu Hanmou, the Chinese Commander-in-Chief of the Seventh War Zone about the feasibility of establishing a British Army Aid Group to resist the Japanese invasion on a joint basis. Throughout the negotiation, Holmes worked as the translator for the British. Shortly afterwards, Colonel (later Sir) Lindsay Ride, a prisoner of war from a Japanese concentration camp in Hong Kong, successfully made his escape and arrived at Chongqing. As a result, Ride officially formed the British Army Aid Group in July 1942. Both Holmes and Paul Tsui (徐家祥), a close friend Holmes had met in Shaoguan, joined the group in November and were immediately sent to station in Dong River, Huizhou.

In Huiyang, Holmes was under the command of Colonel (later Sir) Douglas Clague. He was assigned to deal with external affairs and to co-operate closely with the guerillas of the East River Column (東江縱隊). With the help from the guerillas, Holmes had organised a number of rescue plans trying to save the prisoners of war from the Japanese concentration camps and had conducted espionage in the Japanese-occupied region. According to the recollection of Paui Tsui, Holmes and his companions once secretly entered Hong Kong and reached the foot of Lion Rock. From the foot of the mountain, he used binoculars to spy the concentration camp far away in To Kwa Wan regardless the potential danger of being discovered by the Japanese. Fortunately, although Holmes was a Westerner, the Japanese had never recognised that the fluent Cantonese speaker was in fact a British. Tsui explained the reason was because Holmes was not huge physically and with the disguise of wearing bamboo hat and grey linen clothing, he just looked the same as a common Chinese farmer. His bravery was appreciated by the British government that he was awarded a Military Cross in early 1943 and was made a Member of the Order of the British Empire (MBE) of the Military Division a few months later. It was rare at that time to be decorated twice in a single year.

In 1944, Holmes was promoted to the rank of Major and was responsible for supervising the frontier post in Huizhou. By then Holmes had become a very good friend of Tsui. On one occasion, he even sent his only suit to Tsui for the use in Tsui's wedding. After the war, under the recommendation of Holmes, Tsui further became the first ethnic Chinese to be appointed a cadet and followed Holmes in the government of Hong Kong. In the end of 1944, Holmes applied for leave of absence and travelled to Australia. He remained in there until the end of the war.

=== Postwar years ===
In August 1945, the Second World War finally ended by the unconditional surrender of Japan. After the liberation, Holmes was immediately summoned back to Hong Kong in September and to serve in the provisional military government. Although the military government was headed by Vice Admiral Sir Cecil Harcourt, all the civil affairs were in charge by David Mercer Macdougall, the Chief Civil Affairs Officer dispatched from London, and Claude Bramall Burgess, a government cadet who was imprisoned by the Japanese during the war. Besides, Holmes and his former colleague Edmund Brinsley Teesdale were responsible for all the matters in the provisional Colonial Secretariat. To assist him in dealing with the affairs in New Territories, Holmes also appointed Paul Tsui as the Assistant District Officer, New Territories.

When the provisional military government ceased to function in May 1946, Hong Kong re-established its own civil government. In the early postwar years, Holmes continued to serve in the Colonial Secretariat and was the Deputy Clerk of both the Legislative and Executive Councils from 1946 to 1947. After that, he was sent to the Imperial Defence College in London by the government for advanced study. Upon returning to Hong Kong, he rejoined the government and worked in different capacities including the Deputy Secretary for Chinese Affairs. In July 1951, he became the acting Social Welfare Officer of the Secretariat for Chinese Affairs while the holder of the position, John McDouall was absent. When McDouall resumed in 1952, Holmes was appointed to different posts including the Clerk of the Executive and Legislative Councils.

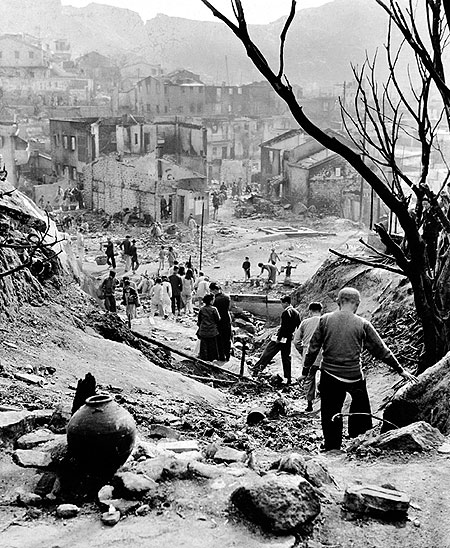
The slum area in Shek Kip Mei after the great fire on the Christmas Day of 1953.

In December 1953, a major fire destroyed the slum area in Shek Kip Mei and more than 50,000 refugees were made homeless. After the disaster, then Governor Sir Alexander Grantham ordered Holmes to establish the Resettlement Department and appointed him as the Deputy Colonial Secretary and the first Commissioner of Resettlement. To resettle the homeless refugees in a short period of time, he took the lead to construct a number of resettlement estates on the burnt ground in Shek Kip Mei and in its neighbouring area. Some of the notable examples included Shek Kip Mei Estate and Tai Hang Tung Estate. Since the creation of the Resettlement Department, constructing public housing estate for resettling the poor people had become one of the primary policy goals set by the government in postwar Hong Kong. On the other hand, Holmes was also an official member of the Urban Council during his tenure as the Commissioner of Resettlement. In October 1955, when he succeeded the retired Harold Giles Richards as the Director of Urban Services, he stepped down from the Resettlement Department but was also appointed official member of the legislative council. His original post of the Commissioner of Resettlement was succeeded by Arthur Walton. During his tenure as the Director of Urban Services, Holmes witnessed the expansion of the Council that the number of unofficial members was increased to eight in 1956. It was the first time in history that unofficial member occupied half of the seats in the council. However, the demand on further reform was not satisfied by the expansion, and therefore the relationship between the unofficial members and the government became worsening under his term of office.

In 1958, Holmes left the Urban and Legislative Councils and replaced Kenneth Barnett as the District Commissioner, New Territories. His tenure as the District Commissioner witnessed the end of a long-time discord between the government and the Heung Yee Kuk, the non-governmental advisory body in New Territories formed by the indigenous inhabitants. Before his appointment, the Kuk had been split by internal dispute over land issue since 1957 and the government had ceased to recognise the Kuk due to its disorder. In the 13th Heung Yee Kuk election in 1959, the Kuk was once again torn into two factions and there was severe and heated quarrel over the election. Throughout the election dispute, Holmes played a key role to pacify both sides and took an active role to reconcile the dispute successfully. Later in December 1959, with the help of Holmes, the government passed the Heung Yee Kuk Ordinance which officially granted the statutory advisory status to the Kuk, thus effectively comforted the Kuk. In 1962, Holmes was promoted to the post of the Director of Commerce and Industry and was made a Commander of the Order of the British Empire (CBE) in the New Year Honours. His term as Director of Commerce and Industry coincided with the blooming of the local textile industry and he paid a number of visits to different European countries aiming at negotiating trade agreement on textile and expanding the overseas market for the textile industry of Hong Kong. From May to August 1964, Holmes was on vacation so his Deputy Director, Terence Dare Sorby, acted for his position during his absence. By July of the same year, then Governor Sir David Trench reorganised the Legislative Council and the holder of the Director of Commerce and Industry was admitted to the council as an official member. Therefore, Sorby also became an acting official member of the Legislative Council until the return of Holmes in August. It was the second time for Holmes to be appointed to the Legislative Council and soon afterwards he was further appointed as an official member of the Executive Council in 1965, thus becoming a much relied official member in the two Councils.

In late 1966, the then Secretary for Chinese Affairs, John McDouall, retired to the United Kingdom and Holmes was chosen to succeed the post which McDouall had served for a decade. Nevertheless, at the time of his promotion the Cultural Revolution had just broken out in the mainland China and the situation of Hong Kong had become increasingly unstable. In the following year, Hong Kong was finally hit by the outbreak of the 1967 Leftist Riots, a series of riots which was triggered by a labour dispute. During the disorder, Governor Sir David Trench happened to be absent from Hong Kong and all of a sudden there was no one fully in command of the government. As a result, then Colonial Secretary, Sir Michael Gass, became acting-Governor and Holmes became acting-Colonial Secretary, and therefore it was Holmes and Gass who were in charge in the crisis. At the beginning of the riot, there were only general strikes in Hong Kong but the situation worsened quickly when the Communists started to put pipe bombs on the streets. The presence of pipe bombs was a big blow to Hong Kong as it roused public fear, while the British government and the Hong Kong government secretly discussed whether or not to abandon the Crown Colony. It was said that Holmes strongly resisted the idea of retreat in the Executive Council, and he successfully persuaded the British to stay. Under the leadership of Holmes, the government adopted a hard-line policy towards the Communists and called on the general public to denounce the leftists. Finally, the rioting ended in late 1967, and the tough stance held by Holmes was deeply appreciated by the government.

After the riot, Trench recognised the necessity to implement further reform of the government. So, with the assistance from Holmes, the government began a City District Officer Scheme in May 1968 which was based on the existing District Officer system in the New Territories. Under the new scheme, Hong Kong Island and Kowloon were divided into 10 different districts. Each district had a District Office where the District Officer concerned could collect public opinions, receive complaints and provide advice and quick responses. This scheme effectively drew the relationship between the government and the general public closer than it used to be, as the general public could easily express their needs and demands to the District Officer nearby. Alongside the reform, the Secretariat for Chinese Affairs was reorganised into the Home Affairs Department in February 1969 while the post of the Secretary for Chinese Affairs was renamed into the Secretary for Home Affairs. Holmes continued to serve after the reorganisation and was made a Companion of the Order of St Michael and St George (CMG) in the same year. Before retiring from the Home Affairs Department, he had been focusing on the legislation on abolishing polygyny. Yet, such legislation was completed in October 1971, five months after his retirement from the civil service.

=== Later years ===
Although Holmes retired from the post of the Secretary for Home Affairs and the official members of the two Councils in May 1971, he became the chairman of the Public Service Commission in November 1971 and received his knighthood from Queen Elizabeth II in Buckingham Palace on 13 July 1973. He finally retired from the Commission in May 1977 and began his quiet retirement with his family in Corfu, Greece. In May 1981, Holmes and his wife paid a visit to his old friends in Hong Kong. He felt unwell during the visit and was admitted to the Queen Mary Hospital for a few weeks. The couple continued their visit after his recovery. Unfortunately, upon returning to Greece, Holmes became very sick and died in a hospital on Corfu on 14 June 1981, aged 67.

At a memorial service in St. John's Cathedral, Holmes was eulogised by Hong Kong Governor Murray MacLehose, Chief Secretary Sir Jack Cater and others. Secretary for Home Affairs Denis Campbell Bray hailed him as "one of the founders of post-war Hong Kong". Another memorial service was held in St Paul's, Covent Garden, in London, on 14 July 1981, attended by Lady Holmes. Holmes' remains were interred in the British Cemetery on Corfu.

== Family ==
Holmes first met his future wife, Charlotte Marjorie Fisher (18 July 1920 – 14 January 2012) while on holiday in Australia in 1944. She was the only daughter of Frank Hastings Fisher, a former representative and manager of British American Tobacco in Japan. They were married at St. John's Church, Toorak, Victoria, at 11:00 am on 31 January 1945. Lady Holmes was a renowned botanical artist in her own right. The couple had two sons and the whole family moved to Corfu in 1974. Sir Ronald's hobbies included reading, travel and golf. He was a member of the Travellers Club in London and the Hong Kong Club and the Royal Hong Kong Jockey Club in Hong Kong.

== Honours ==
=== Conferment ===
- Military Cross (9 March 1943)
- Member of the Order of the British Empire (Military Division, 4 May 1943)
- Efficiency Decoration (1956)
- Commander of the Order of the British Empire (New Year Honours, 1962)
- Companion of the Order of St Michael and St George (Queen's Birthday Honours, 1969)
- Unofficial Justice of the Peace (August 1969)
- Knight Bachelor (New Year Honours, 1973)

=== Titles ===
- Ronald Holmes (26 December 1913 – 9 March 1943)
- Ronald Holmes, MC (9 March 1943 – 4 May 1943)
- Ronald Holmes, MBE, MC (4 May 1943 – November 1955)
- The Honourable Ronald Holmes, MBE, MC (November 1955 – 1956)
- The Honourable Ronald Holmes, MBE, MC, ED (1956–1958)
- Ronald Holmes, MBE, MC, ED (1958 – January 1962)
- Ronald Holmes, CBE, MC, ED (January 1962 – June 1964)
- The Honourable Ronald Holmes, CBE, MC, ED (June 1964 – June 1969)
- The Honourable Ronald Holmes, CMG, CBE, MC, ED (June 1969 – August 1969)
- The Honourable Ronald Holmes, CMG, CBE, MC, ED, JP (August 1969 – May 1971)
- Ronald Holmes, CMG, CBE, MC, ED, JP (May 1971 – January 1973)
- Sir Ronald Holmes, CMG, CBE, MC, ED, JP (January 1973 – 14 June 1981)

== See also ==
- Secretariat for Chinese Affairs
- British Army Aid Group (BAAG)
- Hong Kong 1967 Leftist Riots
- Paul Tsui

== Footnotes ==
Government offices
Preceded by New Creation	Commissioner of Resettlement; 1954–1955	Succeeded by Arthur Walton
Preceded by Harold Giles Richards	Director of Urban Services; 1955–1958	Succeeded by Colin Morrison
Preceded by Kenneth Barnett	District Commissioner, New Territories; 1958–1962	Succeeded by John Philip Aserappa
Preceded by Herbert Alexander Angus	Director of Commerce and Industry; 1962–1966	Succeeded by Terence Dare Sorby
Preceded by John McDouall	Secretary for Chinese Affairs; 1966–1969	Succeeded by Secretary for Home Affairs
Preceded by Secretary for Chinese Affairs	Secretary for Home Affairs; February 1969 – May 1971	Succeeded by Donald Luddington
Preceded by Sir Charles Hartwell	Chairman of the Public Service Commission; November 1971 – May 1977	Succeeded by Sir Donald Luddington
