= Donald Luddington =

British colonial government official

Sir Donald Luddington KBE CMG CVO

22nd High Commissioner for the Western Pacific
- In office 10 October 1973 – 2 January 1976
- Monarch: Elizabeth II
- Preceded by: Sir Michael Gass
- Succeeded by: Office abolished

6th Governor of the Solomon Islands
- In office 21 August 1974 – 2 January 1976
- Monarch: Elizabeth II
- Preceded by: New creation
- Succeeded by: Sir Colin Allan

2nd Commissioner of the Independent Commission Against Corruption
- In office 4 July 1978 – 10 November 1980
- Preceded by: Jack Cater
- Succeeded by: Peter Barry Williams

Personal details
- Born: 18 August 1920 Edinburgh, Scotland, United Kingdom
- Died: 26 January 2009 (aged 88) Easingwold, Yorkshire, United Kingdom
- Spouse: Garry Brodie Johnston
- Children: 1 son, 1 daughter
- Education: University of St. Andrews

Sir Donald Collin Cumyn Luddington, KBE CMG CVO (Chinese: 陸鼎堂爵士, 18 August 1920 – 26 January 2009) was a British colonial government official and civil servant who served firstly in the Hong Kong Government and became District Commissioner, New Territories and the Secretary for Home Affairs successively, during which he had also served as an official member of the Legislative Council. He was later promoted to Oceania and was High Commissioner for the Western Pacific and Governor of the Solomon Islands during the period from 1973 to 1976. He returned to Hong Kong in 1977 to replace Sir Ronald Holmes as chairman of the Public Service Commission. He was the second person, after Sir Jack Cater, to hold the post of Commissioner of ICAC from 1978 until his retirement in 1980.

== Biography ==
=== Early years ===
Luddington was born on 18 August 1920 in Edinburgh, Scotland. His father, Norman John Luddington, was a civil servant in British Ceylon and his mother was Myrtle Amethyst Payne. He studied at Dover College and then the University of St Andrews, where he obtained a MA degree.

From 1940 to 1946, he served in the British Army and fought in the Second World War. He was initially commissioned as a second lieutenant in the King's Own Yorkshire Light Infantry (KOYLI) on 28 December 1940, and transferred to the Royal Armoured Corps (RAC) on 22 October 1941. He saw action in India and Arakan, Burma amongst others, and was Mentioned in Despatches on 5 April 1945. By that time he was a lieutenant, he continued to hold his emergency commission until 19 July 1952 when he transferred to the Reserve of Officers, and was granted the honorary rank of captain.

=== Colonial services ===
In February 1949, Luddington arrived at Hong Kong as a Colonial Service cadet and began his career as an official in Hong Kong. He was initially sent to Tai Po as a District Officer and later served in various government departments, including the Secretariat for Chinese Affairs, the Hong Kong Police Force, the Colonial Secretariat, and the Commerce and Industry Department. Apart from that, he also served in the Royal Hong Kong Regiment from 1949 to 1955. In November 1960, he was appointed Defence Secretary and principal assistant colonial secretary and was responsible for overseeing the security issues of Hong Kong. He later served successively as Deputy Secretary for Home Affairs and Deputy Director of Commerce and Industry in the mid-1960s and became a member of the Hong Kong Management Association. In April 1969, Luddington replaced Kenneth Strathmore Kinghorn as District Commissioner, New Territories, thus becoming an official member of the Legislative Council appointed by then Governor Sir David Trench under the approval from the Queen. In June that year he was further appointed as an official Justice of the Peace.

In May 1971, Luddington succeeded (later Sir) Ronald Holmes as the Secretary for Home Affairs and became a principal government official. However, as Rafael Hui, a former junior colleague to Luddington recalled, he was too upright, and therefore, was not on very good terms with the diplomat-turned-new-governor, Sir Murray MacLehose. It was said that in one occasion MacLehose had ordered something for Luddington's subordinates to follow-up. Nevertheless, Luddington deemed the diplomatic-like orders were nonsense and dismissed all of them. As a result, in May 1973, he was "promoted" to Oceania by the Governor. He was appointed High Commissioner for the Western Pacific on 10 October 1973, and his major duty was to administer a small and remote British colony, the British Solomon Islands. Yet, to let Luddington leave Hong Kong with dignity, he was appointed Companion of the Order of St Michael and St George before being appointed as high commissioner. On 21 August 1974, he was further appointed as Governor of the British Solomon Islands Protectorate and he continued to serve this position until January 1976. After that the position of high commissioner for the Western Pacific was abolished, and thus he was the last person to hold this post.

During his term as governor, he entertained Queen Elizabeth II and Prince Philip in their royal visit to the Solomon Islands in February 1974. He was subsequently appointed Commander of the Royal Victorian Order for his hospitality to the Queen. Furthermore, under his supervision, a new constitution was adopted in 1974 establishing a parliamentary democracy and ministerial system of government for the colony. In mid-1975, the name "Solomon Islands" officially replaced that of "British Solomon Islands Protectorate" which paved way for the colony to self-government and independence. Luddington left the governorship in January 1976 and self-government was established immediately. Two years later, the Solomon Islands gained independence from the United Kingdom as a Commonwealth realm. Luddington was appointed Knight Commander of the Order of the British Empire in the Queen's Birthday Honours in June 1976 for his services to Oceania.

In May 1977, Sir Donald returned to Hong Kong to succeed Sir Ronald Holmes as chairman of the Public Service Commission. He left the post in March 1978 but was appointed to replace Jack Cater as the second Commissioner of ICAC by Governor MacLehose on 4 July in the same year. During his term as the Commissioner, he strove to improve the stained relationship between the ICAC and the Royal Hong Kong Police Force and built up the ICAC's public reputation for devotion to anti-corruption. He finally retired from the government in November 1980.

=== Later years ===
Luddington spent his later years in retirement in Easingwold, Yorkshire. He died in a hospital in Harrogate on 26 January 2009 at the age of 88. He died the last surviving former high commissioner for the Western Pacific. On his death, Hong Kong Chief Executive Donald Tsang and ICAC Commissioner Timothy Tong both sent condolences and praised Luddington's contribution to Hong Kong.

== Family ==
Luddington was married to Garry Brodie Johnston, in 1945. The couple had one son and one daughter. Lady Luddington once served as the Vice President of the Hong Kong Girl Guides Association. She died on 4 November 2002. Sir Donald's hobbies included reading and walking. He was a member of the Royal Commonwealth Society and the Hong Kong Club.

On 7 November 1980, Lady Luddington laid the foundation stone of the Hong Kong Girl Guides Association's new headquarters in Gascoigne Road, Kowloon.

== Honours ==
=== Conferment ===
- Official Justice of the Peace (June 1969)
- Companion of the Order of St Michael and St George (2 June 1973)
- Commander of the Royal Victorian Order (21 February 1974)
- Knight Commander of the Order of the British Empire (12 June 1976)

=== Titles ===
- Donald Luddington (18 August 1920 – April 1969)
- The Honourable Donald Luddington (April 1969 – June 1969)
- The Honourable Donald Luddington, JP (June 1969 – April 1971)
- Donald Luddington, JP (April 1971 – May 1971)
- The Honourable Donald Luddington, JP (May 1971 – May 1973)
- Donald Luddington (May 1973 – 2 June 1973)
- Donald Luddington, CMG (2 June 1973 – 21 February 1974)
- Donald Luddington, CMG, CVO (21 February 1974 – 12 June 1976)
- Sir Donald Luddington, KBE, CMG, CVO (12 June 1976 – 26 January 2009)

== See also ==
- Independent Commission Against Corruption (Hong Kong)
- Solomon Islands
- David Jeaffreson

== See also ==
- Video of Sir Donald at Honiara on the US Bicentennial

== Footnotes ==
Political offices
Preceded by Sir Michael Gass	High Commissioner for the Western Pacific; October 1973 – January 1976	Office Abolished
New office	Governor of the British Solomon Islands Protectorate renamed Governor of the Solomon Islands in 1975; August 1974 – January 1976	Succeeded by Colin Allan
Government offices
Preceded by Kenneth Stratmore Kinghorn	District Commissioner, New Territories; April 1969 – April 1971	Succeeded by Denis Bray
Preceded by Ronald Holmes	Secretary for Home Affairs; May 1971 – May 1973	Succeeded by Jack Cater
Preceded by Jack Cater	Commissioner, Independent Commission Against Corruption; 1978–1980	Succeeded by Peter Barry Williams
Civic offices
Preceded by Sir Ronald Holmes	Chairman of the Public Service Commission; May 1977 – March 1978	Succeeded by Ian MacDonald Lightbody
