= Robin Black (colonial administrator) =

British colonial administrator (1906–1999)

Sir Robin Black GCMG OBE

23rd Governor of Hong Kong
- In office 23 January 1958 – 31 March 1964
- Monarch: Elizabeth II
- Colonial Secretary: Edgeworth David; Claude Bramall Burgess; Edmund Brinsley Teesdale
- Preceded by: Alexander Grantham
- Succeeded by: David Trench

3rd Governor of Singapore
- In office 30 June 1955 – 9 December 1957
- Monarch: Elizabeth II
- Chief Secretary: William Goode
- Chief Minister: David Marshall; Lim Yew Hock
- Preceded by: John Nicoll; William Goode (acting)
- Succeeded by: William Goode

19th Colonial Secretary of Hong Kong
- In office 20 February 1952 – 30 March 1955
- Monarch: Elizabeth II
- Preceded by: John Nicoll
- Succeeded by: Edgeworth David

Personal details
- Born: Robert Brown Black; 3 June 1906 Edinburgh, Scotland
- Died: 19 October 1999 (aged 93) Dunedin Hospital, Reading, Berkshire, England
- Spouse(s): Anne, Lady Black
- Children: 2
- Profession: Colonial administrator

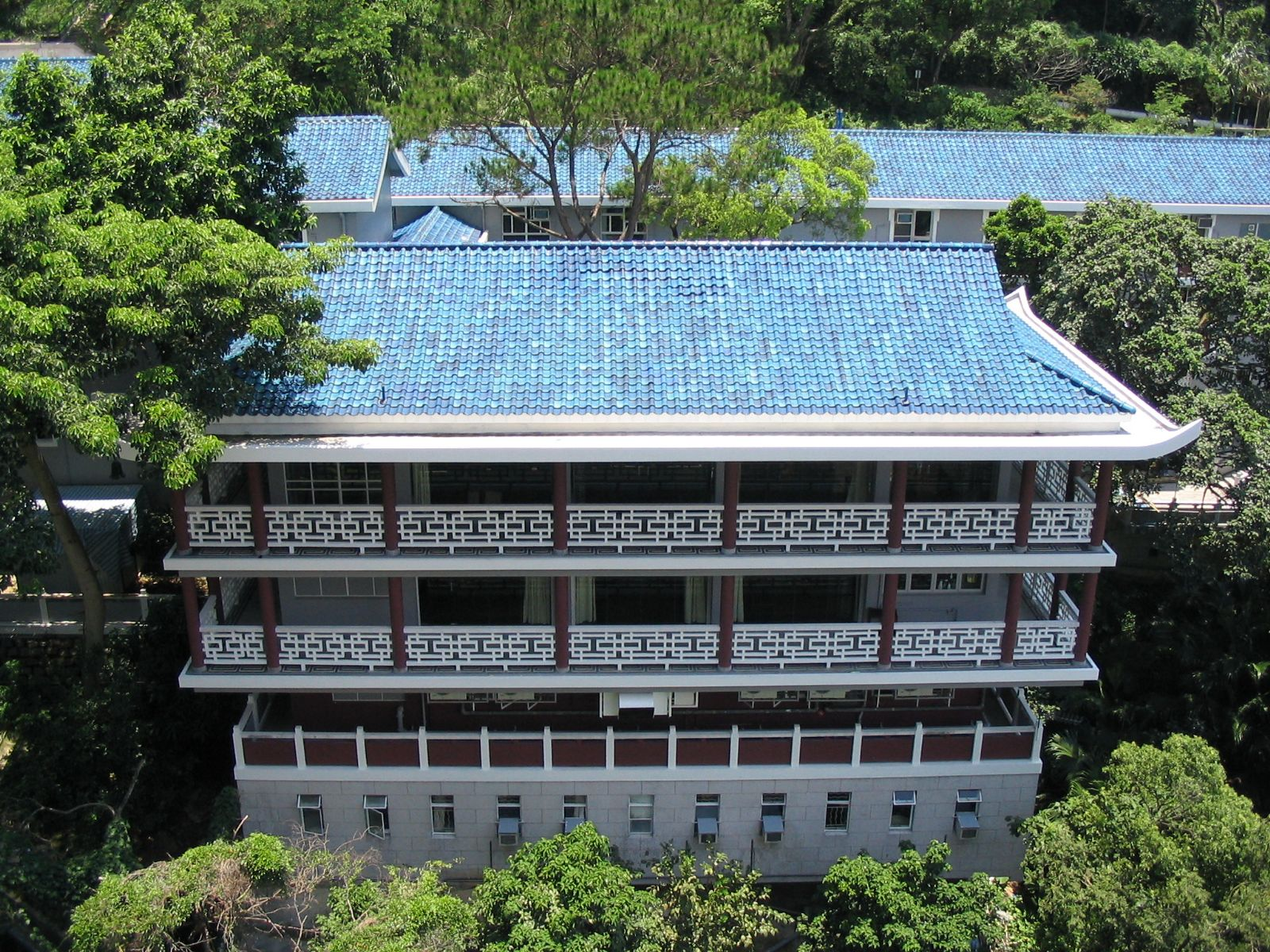
Robert Black College of the University of Hong Kong was named after him.

Sir Robert Brown "Robin" Black, GCMG, OBE (Chinese: 柏立基; 3 June 1906 – 19 October 1999) was a British colonial administrator who served as Governor of Singapore from 1955 to 1957, and Governor of Hong Kong from 1958 to 1964.

== Biography ==
Born in Edinburgh and educated at George Watson's College and the University of Edinburgh, he would spend three decades overseas and return to Britain in the 1960s. Entering the Colonial Administration Service in 1930, Black served in numerous postings in Asia until becoming assistant colonial secretary of Trinidad. He became the secretary of Malayan Foreign Exchange Control in 1940.

During his posting in North Borneo, Black was commissioned into the Intelligence Corps and involved in guerilla resistance against the Japanese. He was captured in 1942 and spent the remainder of World War II in a Japanese prisoner-of-war camp.

After the war ended, he returned to the colonial service and served as deputy chief secretary in North Borneo until 1952. He then became the colonial secretary of Hong Kong before moving on to Singapore as Governor in 1955. Subsequently, he became Governor of Hong Kong from 1958 to 1964.

=== Governor of Hong Kong ===
During his governorship, Hong Kong became increasingly prosperous. At the same time, many tens of thousands of refugees were illegally crossing the border from China every year, driven in part by widespread famine in China during the years 1958–1961. Some were stopped and sent back, but almost all of the hundreds of thousands who reached Kowloon were allowed to stay. This influx placed an enormous burden on the colonial authorities, but the needs of the refugees were met by a programme of public housing construction and public health measures.

Robert Black had been dealing with leftists in a heavy-handed way. On 18 April 1958, a raid was conducted on the library of the Pui Kiu Middle School (PKMS). The officer-in-charge of the Hong Kong Island Section of the Inspectorate of Education visited the school with five assistants. Nineteen books were confiscated and four were used as evidence of the 'mismanagement of the school' in a warning letter addressed to the school supervisor on 13 May. On the basis of these and other accusations, such as hiring of unregistered teachers and discussion of political issues in school meetings, To Pak-fui (杜伯奎), the principal of PKMS, was deported on 6 August, to Lo Wu.

Hong Kong experienced a prolonged drought of unanticipated severity during the last two years of his tenure, which led to a serious water shortage. Water rationing was imposed in May 1962 and continued through August 1964. From June 1963 until late May 1964 (when the arrival of Typhoon Viola ended the drought) the water supply was restricted to a single four-hour period every four days.

Black helped establish the Chinese University of Hong Kong by uniting several smaller institutions. He served as Chancellor of both the Chinese University of Hong Kong and the University of Hong Kong during his tenure as Governor of Hong Kong.

He was knighted (KCMG) in 1955 and promoted to GCMG in 1962.

== Post-governorship ==
Black returned to Britain in 1964. He was active with the Commonwealth War Graves Commission and the Royal Commonwealth Society, and served as chairman of the Clerical Medical and General Life Assurance Society in the 1970s. He died on 19 October 1999, having been predeceased in 1986 by his wife Anne. He was survived by their two daughters, Barbara and Kathryn.

== Tributes ==
- Robert Black College, a graduate college of the University of Hong Kong
- Robert Black Health Centre in San Po Kong, Hong Kong
- Sir Robert Black College of Education, now merged into the Hong Kong Institute of Education
- (for his wife) The Anne Black YWCA, Kowloon
- (for his wife) Anne Black Health Centre, North Point

== Notes ==
Government offices
Preceded by Sir Alexander Grantham	Governor of Hong Kong; 1958–1964	Succeeded by Sir David Trench
Preceded by Sir John Nicoll	Governor of Singapore; 1955–1957	Succeeded by Sir William Goode
Preceded by Sir John Nicoll	Colonial Secretary of Hong Kong; 1952–1954	Succeeded by Sir Edgeworth David
