= Elizabeth, Lady Gass =

English noble; Lord-Lieutenant of Somerset

- Born: Elizabeth Acland-Hood; March 2, 1940 (age 86)
- Other name: Elizabeth Periam Glass
- Education: Cheltenham Ladies' College; Girton College, Cambridge; University of Cambridge
- Occupation: Lord-lieutenant
- Years active: 1985 - 2015
- Known for: Lord-Lieutenant of Somerset from 1998 to 2015
- Spouse: Michael David Irving Gass (1975 - 1983)
- Family: Alexander Fuller-Acland-Hood, 1st Baron St Audries (paternal grandfather)

Dame Elizabeth Periam Gass, Lady Gass, DCVO, DStJ, JP (née Acland-Hood; born 2 March 1940) was Lord-Lieutenant of Somerset from 1998 to 2015.

== Early life and education ==
She is the eldest daughter and co-heiress of the Honorable John Acland-Hood, a barrister and his wife, Phyllis (née Hallett), Elizabeth Acland-Hood. She studied at Cheltenham Ladies' College and Girton College, Cambridge. Her father was himself a younger son of Alexander Fuller-Acland-Hood, 1st Baron St Audries.

Having graduated from the University of Cambridge, Acland-Hood worked as a schoolteacher, teaching mathematics. In 1967 she inherited from an uncle her family's ancestral seat, Fairfield House, near Stogursey, Somerset, and gave up her teaching career to concentrate on managing the estate which came with it.

In 1975, she married Sir Michael Gass KCMG, who died in 1983. He was a former High Commissioner for the Western Pacific (1969–71) and Governor of the Solomon Islands (1969–73), and they had no children.

In 1985, two years after being widowed, Gass was elected to Somerset County Council, as a Conservative Party Councillor for the Quantock district, and remained a member until 1997.

From 1989 to 1993 she was Chairman of the Exmoor National Park Committee and at the same time was Vice-Chairman of the county council's Social Services Committee. In 1994 she was High Sheriff of Somerset, the next year was appointed a Deputy Lieutenant for Somerset, and in 1996 was promoted to Vice Lord-Lieutenant and appointed as a Justice of the Peace for the county. In 1998, she became Lord Lieutenant of Somerset, a position she held until March 2015. In 2011, she attracted considerable negative attention after selling some 230 acres of land on the coast beneath the Quantock Hills for about £50 million. The land was the part of her Fairfield estate lying immediately to the west of the Hinkley Point power station and was wanted for the construction of two new nuclear reactors.

=== Other appointments ===
- Director, Avalon NHS Trust, 1993–96
- Commissioner, English Heritage, 1995–2001
- Member of Committee of National Trust (Wessex) 1994–2002
- National Executive Committee, Country Landowners Association, 1998–2003
- Wessex Committee, HHA, 1998–present
- Wells Cathedral Council, since 2004
- Member of Council of Cheltenham Ladies' College, 1992–2001
- Member of Council of Bath University, 1999–2002
- Trustee of West of England School for Children with Little or no Sight, 1996–2008
- President, Royal Bath and West of England Society, 2002–03
- President, Somerset County Scout Council
- Patron, Somerset Sight
- Patron, British Red Cross in Somerset, 2013–present
- Vice-President Wessex Reserve Forces' and Cadets' Association 1998–2015
- Trustee, Calvert Trust Exmoor
- Patron, Somerset Churches Trust

== Personal life ==
Lady Gass is a Dame of the Order of St John and was appointed Dame Commander of the Royal Victorian Order (DCVO) in the 2014 New Year Honours List.
