= Hugh Norman-Walker =

British colonial official (1916–1985)

Sir Hugh Norman-Walker KCMG OBE KStJ

Governor of Hong Kong
- Acting
- In office 19 October 1971 – 19 November 1971
- Monarch: Elizabeth II
- Colonial Secretary: Himself
- Preceded by: Sir David Trench
- Succeeded by: Sir Murray MacLehose

24th Colonial Secretary of Hong Kong
- In office 29 March 1969 – 29 September 1973
- Monarch: Elizabeth II
- Governor: Sir David Trench; Sir Murray MacLehose
- Preceded by: Sir Michael Gass
- Succeeded by: Sir Denys Roberts

16th Governor of the Seychelles
- In office February 1967 – 1969
- Monarch: Elizabeth II
- Preceded by: The 2nd Earl of Oxford and Asquith
- Succeeded by: Sir Bruce Greatbatch

2nd Queen's Commissioner in Bechuanaland
- In office 1965 – 30 September 1966
- Monarch: Elizabeth II
- Preceded by: Sir Peter Fawcus
- Succeeded by: Independence as the Republic of Botswana

Personal details
- Born: 17 December 1916 London, United Kingdom
- Died: 28 August 1985 (aged 68) Farley, Wiltshire, United Kingdom
- Occupation: Colonial official

Sir Hugh Selby Norman-Walker KCMG OBE KStJ (17 December 1916 – 28 August 1985) was a British colonial official. He served in India from 1938 to 1948. Joining the Colonial Office in 1949, he successively served as an Administrative Officer and an Assistant Secretary in Nyasaland, and was seconded to the Cabinet Office of the Federation of Rhodesia and Nyasaland in 1953. He returned to Nyasaland to become Development Secretary in 1954, Deputy Financial Secretary in 1960 and Secretary to the Treasury in 1961. He remained in the government until 1965 when Nyasaland gained independence as Malawi in 1964. In 1965, Sir Hugh was posted to the Bechuanaland Protectorate as Her Majesty's Commissioner. Knighted in 1966, in September of the same year he witnessed the independence of the Protectorate as Botswana. In the next year, Norman-Walker was posted to the Seychelles as the Governor and Commander-in-Chief but his short tenure came to an end when he was assigned to succeed Sir Michael Gass, who was in turn appointed High Commissioner for the Western Pacific, as Colonial Secretary of Hong Kong in 1969. He was once rumoured to be the designated candidate to succeed Sir David Trench as the Governor of Hong Kong, but the rumour soon died out when the post was taken up by Sir Murray MacLehose, a career diplomat, in 1971.

Sir Hugh was supposed to become the Lieutenant Governor of the Isle of Man when his tenure in Hong Kong ended in 1973. However, when it became known that his wife would not accompany him, he was forced to decline the offer. Sir Hugh was not compensated with another post for his withdrawal. He spent his retirement in England and was appointed chairman of the Isle of Wight County Structure Plan Panel in 1976.

== Biography ==
=== Early years ===
Norman-Walker was born in London on 17 December 1916 to Colonel J N Norman-Walker, CIE of the Indian Medical Service in the Indian Army. Norman-Walker did not spend his childhood with his parents, who served far away in India. He was educated first in St Cyprian's School, Eastbourne, and then Sherborne School in Dorset. Although living in England, he was able to pay several visits to his parents, and was familiar with the state of affairs in India.

Upon graduation from Sherborne School, Norman-Walker entered Corpus Christi College, Cambridge, where he was a noted member in the athletics team. He later graduated with a Master of Arts degree.

=== Colonial career ===
In 1938, Norman-Walker followed in the footsteps of his parents to India and joined the Indian Civil Service. Throughout his ten-year-long career in the Indian government, he held various posts in different departments across a wide variety of fields. However, he left India in 1948, a year after its independence, and was briefly involved in industrial business in England. This did not last long as his experience as a civil servant in India allowed him to join the Colonial Administrative Service of the Colonial Office soon in 1949, of which he was posted to Nyasaland in Africa as an Administrative Officer, and was promoted an Assistant Secretary in 1953.

In August 1953, when the British colony and the two protectorates in the southern Africa, namely Southern Rhodesia, Northern Rhodesia and Nyasaland federated to become the Federation of Rhodesia and Nyasaland, Norman-Walker was temporarily seconded to the Federation's Cabinet Office to help facilitate its operation. In 1954, he returned to Nyasaland to serve as Development Secretary in the government. He was acting Financial Secretary for several occasions before being appointed Deputy Financial Secretary in 1960. A year later he was made an Officer of the Order of the British Empire and was appointed Secretary to the Treasury later in the year. When Nyasaland gained independence and renamed Malawi in 1964, Norman-Walker remained in the government and was made a Companion of the Order of St Michael and St George.

Norman-Walker stayed in the Malawi government until 1965 when he was appointed Her Majesty's Commissioner of the Bechuanaland Protectorate in June. Before this appointment was made, the Protectorate had been steadily on the way to independence. The capital city of the Protectorate was relocated from South Africa's Mafikeng to the Protectorate's Gaborone in February 1965. A month later self-rule was granted to the Protectorate. Norman-Walker was the last Commissioner of the Protectorate and was there to prepare for the independence, though he had very little to do in his short tenure. He was made a Knight Commander of the Order of St Michael and St George in the New Year Honours List of 1966 and he witnessed the independence of the Republic of Botswana on 30 September 1966.

After the independence of Botswana, Norman-Walker was posted to the Seychelles in February 1967 to succeed Lord Oxford and Asquith as the Governor and Commander-in-Chief, President of both the Executive and Legislative Councils of the Seychelles and Commissioner of the British Indian Ocean Territory. However, his governorship coincided with the economic downturn of the islands. In a move to revitalise the economy, he agreed with the plans of local politicians like (later Sir) James Mancham to promote tourism in the islands and was a staunch supporter to the construction plan of the new Seychelles International Airport. The new airport plan was a huge project for the Seychelles at that time. When it was opened by Queen Elizabeth II in 1972, it became one of the most important airports in the region.

Apart from that, Norman-Walker positively supported political reform during his governorship by granting universal adult suffrage to the Legislative Council in December 1967, an important move which paved way for autonomy granted later in 1970.

=== Colonial Secretary of Hong Kong ===
Norman-Walker served in the Seychelles for less than two years when he arrived at Hong Kong on 29 March 1969 to serve as Colonial Secretary, taking over from Sir Michael Gass who was in turn appointed High Commissioner for the Western Pacific. The career background of Norman-Walker was a concern in Hong Kong when his appointment was first announced. Norman-Walker had never served in the Far East. He had visited Hong Kong once, briefly landing on the Kowloon side, but had never been to Hong Kong Island. Local people and even some senior officials in the government were concerned that his limited experience on the Far East might hinder his work as Colonial Secretary. Elsie Tu, an Urban Councillor, even commented that the post of Colonial Secretary should be held by a local Chinese. Yet, there were also comments that selecting Norman-Walker in lieu of a senior official from within the government of Hong Kong showed a lack of suitable local candidates from the point of view of the British government. In respond to these opinions, Norman-Walker said that he had served in Africa for many years and was well experienced in public administration. He said he was ready for the challenge and would build friendship with the Chinese people of Hong Kong.

In his capacity as Colonial Secretary, Norman-Walker focused primarily on social, industrial and commercial development. In 1970, accompanied by Sir Sik-nin Chau, he led a delegation representing Hong Kong to the Expo in Osaka, Japan. Norman-Walker was also an ex officio member of both the Executive and Legislative Councils of Hong Kong. He administered the government for several occasions on the absence of the Governor. In October 1971, he was the acting Governor who welcomed the seven-day royal visit paid by the Princess Anne.

Rumour persisted in Hong Kong when Norman-Walker, who gave up his more prestigious governorship in the Seychelles, assumed the post of Colonial Secretary. It was alleged that a backdoor deal was made between the British government and Norman-Walker that he would take up the post of Colonial Secretary only when the British government promised to make him the successor to Sir David Trench, the incumbent Governor of Hong Kong. However, this information was never verified by Norman-Walker. The rumour died out in 1971 when Sir Murray MacLehose, a career diplomat, was announced by the British government as the Governor-designate.

Nevertheless, another rumour followed when the new Governor MacLehose, who brought many new policies to Hong Kong, was said to be 'diplomatic' in style and did not get on well with some of his colleagues. Some of the more old-fashioned colonial officials, such as (later Sir) Donald Luddington were alleged to have found it difficult to get on with the new Governor and were soon posted out of Hong Kong. Norman-Walker was one of these "old-fashioned colonial officials" and news emerged in the beginning of 1972 that he was going to retire from the government at the turn of 1973. This was not confirmed until July 1972 when the UK government announced that the term of Norman-Walker as Colonial Secretary would be extended to the autumn of 1973. In May 1973, it was further announced that Norman-Walker would become the Lieutenant Governor of the Isle of Man.

As a kind of benefit, overseas civil servants in Hong Kong were entitled to a free exclusive sea passage when they retired. Norman-Walker was eligible and chose to enjoy the benefit when he left Hong Kong on 30 September 1973. He was supposed to get on board an ocean liner like his counterparts, but it turned out that there was no ocean liner calling at Hong Kong at the time of his departure. As a result, he was forced to enjoy the entitlement on a cargo ship. On his departure, in the presence of the members of the Executive and Legislative Councils and senior government officials, Norman-Walker boarded Lady Maurine from HMS Tamar and travelled across the Victoria Harbour to the Kowloon side. From there he travelled to Kwai Chung Container Port and boarded the cargo ship, which sailed for Britain.

=== Lieutenant-Governor of the Isle of Man Dispute ===
Norman-Walker was supposed to take up the new post as the Lieutenant-Governor of the Isle of Man after he had returned to England. But a problem arose when it became known that his wife would not accompany him. The reaction in the Isle of Man was negative, and the Tynwald insisted that Lady Norman-Walker should accompany her husband to assist the Lieutenant Governor in carrying out his social duties. In fact, it was not the first time that Norman-Walker had taken up a new post alone. When he arrived at Hong Kong to become Colonial Secretary in 1969, his wife was not with him. The absence of his wife did not attract any criticism at that time in Hong Kong, and she arrived later.

At first, Norman-Walker insisted that he would take up the new post as scheduled no matter whether his wife was with him or not. However, after several failed attempts to persuade the Tynwald, he offered to decline the new post on 31 October 1973. The incumbent Lieutenant-Governor, Sir Peter Stallard, was requested to stay until the British government had found another candidate. On 3 November, Lady Norman-Walker responded to the incident for the first time. She explained that she had been serving out of Britain for too long a time and was eager to reside in England again. She claimed that she had had no intention to be impolite to the Manx people. After the dispute, Norman-Walker was not given another post for compensation and this episode marked an end to his overseas service.

=== Later years ===
Norman-Walker enjoyed a quiet life in Farley, Wiltshire in retirement. In 1976, he was appointed by the government to chair the Isle of Wight County Structure Plan Panel to consult the people of the Isle of Wight on the possible change of the county structure. Before the panel was formed, the Isle of Wight had been planned to be merged with Hampshire under the Local Government Act 1972, but the plan came to a halt when it met with much opposition from local residents. The panel led by Norman-Walker did not achieve any special breakthrough and it was in 1995 that the Isle of Wight finally became a unitary authority.

Norman-Walker died in his home in Farley on 28 August 1985, aged 68. His death was mourned by the government of Hong Kong. His former colleagues in Hong Kong, then Chief Secretary Sir David Akers-Jones and then Chief Justice Sir Denys Roberts, also grieved over his death.

== Family ==
Sir Hugh was married to Janet Baldock in 1948. Sir Hugh's hobbies included sailing, shooting and bridge. He was a member of the East India Club.

== Honours ==
- Officer of the Order of the British Empire (New Year Honours List 1961)
- Companion of the Order of St Michael and St George (Queen's Birthday Honours 1964)
- Knight Commander of the Order of St Michael and St George (New Year Honours List 1966)
- Knight of the Order of St. John of Jerusalem (20 June 1967)
- Official Justice of the Peace, Hong Kong (June 1969)

== See also ==
- Federation of Rhodesia and Nyasaland
- Politics of Seychelles
- Politics of the Isle of Man

== Footnotes ==
Political offices
Preceded by Sir Peter Fawcus	Her Majesty's Commissioner, Bechuanaland Protectorate; July 1965 – September 1966	office abolished
Preceded by Lord Oxford and Asquith	Governor of the Seychelles; February 1967 – January 1969	Succeeded by Sir Bruce Greatbatch
Preceded by Lord Oxford and Asquith	Commissioner of the British Indian Ocean Territory; February 1967 – January 1969	Succeeded by Sir Bruce Greatbatch
Preceded by Sir Michael Gass	Colonial Secretary of Hong Kong; March 1969 – October 1973	Succeeded by Sir Denys Roberts
Preceded by Sir David Trench	Officer Administering the Government (Hong Kong); October 1971 – November 1971	Succeeded by Sir Murray MacLehose
