= Michael David Irving Gass =

Sir Michael Gass KCMG

23rd Colonial Secretary of Hong Kong
- In office 4 September 1965 – 22 January 1969
- Monarch: Elizabeth II
- Governor: Sir David Trench
- Preceded by: Edmund Brinsley Teesdale
- Succeeded by: Sir Hugh Norman-Walker

21st High Commissioner for the Western Pacific
- In office 1969–1971
- Monarch: Elizabeth II
- Preceded by: Robert Sidney Foster
- Succeeded by: Sir Donald Luddington

5th Governor of the Solomon Islands
- In office 1969–1973
- Monarch: Elizabeth II
- Preceded by: Robert Sidney Foster
- Succeeded by: Sir Donald Luddington

Personal details
- Born: 24 April 1916 Wareham, Dorset, England
- Died: 27 February 1983 (aged 66) Somerset, England
- Spouse: Elizabeth Acland-Hood (m. 1975)
- Education: King's School, Bruton
- Alma mater: Queens' College, Cambridge
- Occupation: Colonial official

Military service
- Allegiance: United Kingdom
- Branch/service: Royal West African Frontier Force
- Years of service: 1939–1945
- Rank: Major
- Unit: Gold Coast Regiment
- Battles/wars: World War II

Sir Michael David Irving Gass KCMG (Chinese: 祈濟時; 24 April 1916 – 27 February 1983) was the penultimate High Commissioner for the Western Pacific, Colonial Secretary of Hong Kong from 1965 until 1969, and the acting Governor of Hong Kong during the Hong Kong 1967 Leftist riots.

== Education and war years ==
Born in Wareham, Gass was the eldest son of George Irving Gass and Norah Elizabeth Mustard. Gass was educated at King's School, Bruton, and then later obtained degrees at both Queens' College, Cambridge and Oxford University. After university he entered the Colonial Administration Service. His first appointment was to the Gold Coast in 1939. During World War II Gass entered the Army and achieved the rank of Major, he served in East Africa and Burma with the Gold Coast Regiment of the Royal West African Frontier Force (1939–1945); he was twice mentioned in despatches.

== Career ==
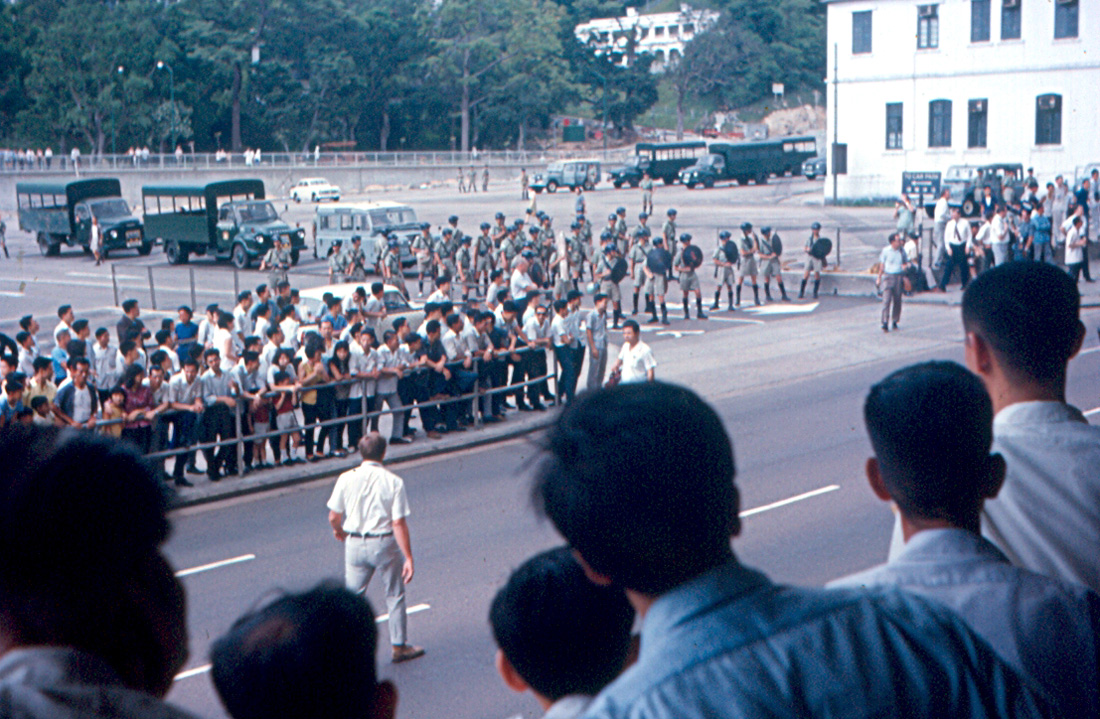
Confrontation between rioters and the Hong Kong Police Force during the riots in 1967

After the war he returned to the Service, spending three years in Ashanti and two in Ghana before being posted in 1958 to the Western Pacific High Commission as Chief Secretary.

From then until his retirement in 1973 he remained in the Far East, notably in Hong Kong where he was Colonial Secretary and Acting Governor intermittently between 1965 and 1969. In the colonial secretary's tenure, he and Ronald Holmes and Jack Cater and other government officials had to deal with riots in 1967 against British colonial rule. During the disorder, Governor Sir David Trench happened to be absent from Hong Kong and all of a sudden there was no one fully in command of the government. As a result, Gass became acting-Governor, and therefore it was Holmes and Gass who were in charge in the crisis. During the riots, he took a tough stance against the activists, to effectively control the situation, but has also become one of the main targets of attack leftist camp vocal opposition.

He became High Commissioner for the Western Pacific on 12 February 1969.

When he returned to England, Gass served as a Member of Somerset County Council (1977–1981).

== Personal life ==
Gass was appointed Commander of the Order of St Michael and St George in the 1960 Birthday Honours and was promoted to Knight Commander of Order of St Michael and St George in the 1969 New Year Honours.

Gass married Elizabeth Acland-Hood in 1975. They had no children.

Government offices
Preceded by Edmund Brinsley Teesdale	Colonial Secretary of Hong Kong; 1965–1969	Succeeded by Sir Hugh Norman-Walker
Preceded by Robert Sidney Foster	High Commissioner for the Western Pacific; 1969–1971	Succeeded by Sir Donald Luddington
Preceded by Robert Sidney Foster	Governor of the Solomon Islands; 1969–1973	Succeeded by Sir Donald Luddington
