= Megarry =

Megarry is a surname originating from Ireland. Notable people with the surname include:

- David R. Megarry, American game designer
- Robert Megarry (1910–2006), British lawyer and judge
- Roy Megarry (1937–2024), Canadian businessman
- Thomas Megarry (1898–1985), Hong Kong civil servant
