= William Sydney Marchant =

British colonial administrator

Resident Commissioner of the Solomon Islands
- In office 1939–1943
- Preceded by: Francis Noel Ashley
- Succeeded by: Owen Cyril Noel

Personal details
- Born: 10 December 1894
- Died: 1 February 1953 (aged 58)

William Sydney Marchant CMG OBE (10 December 1894 – 1 February 1953) was a British colonial administrator. He served as the Resident Commissioner of the Solomon Islands from 1939 to 1943.

== Biography ==
Marchant became an Assistant District Commissioner in East Africa Protectorate in 1919. In 1926 he was promoted to District Officer in Kenya, and then became Deputy Provincial Commissioner and Assistant Secretary in Zanzibar in 1935. In 1937 he moved to neighbouring Tanganyika to continue as a Deputy Provincial Commissioner.

As commissioner, he directed the evacuation of European settlers from the Solomon Islands prior to the Japanese occupation of the islands during World War II as well as leading the organisation of coastwatcher units throughout the islands. Marchant relocated from this headquarters at Tulagi to Malaita about two months before the Japanese occupied Tulagi in May, 1942. On Malaita he helped operate a coastwatcher radio relay station in support of the Allied Solomon Islands campaign until the end of his appointment in 1943.

Marchant was then appointed as Chief Native Commissioner for the Kenya Colony from 1943 until 1947. Marchant died in 1953.
