= 1924 Southern Rhodesian general election =

- 29 April 1924

All 30 seats in the Legislative Assembly 16 seats needed for a majority
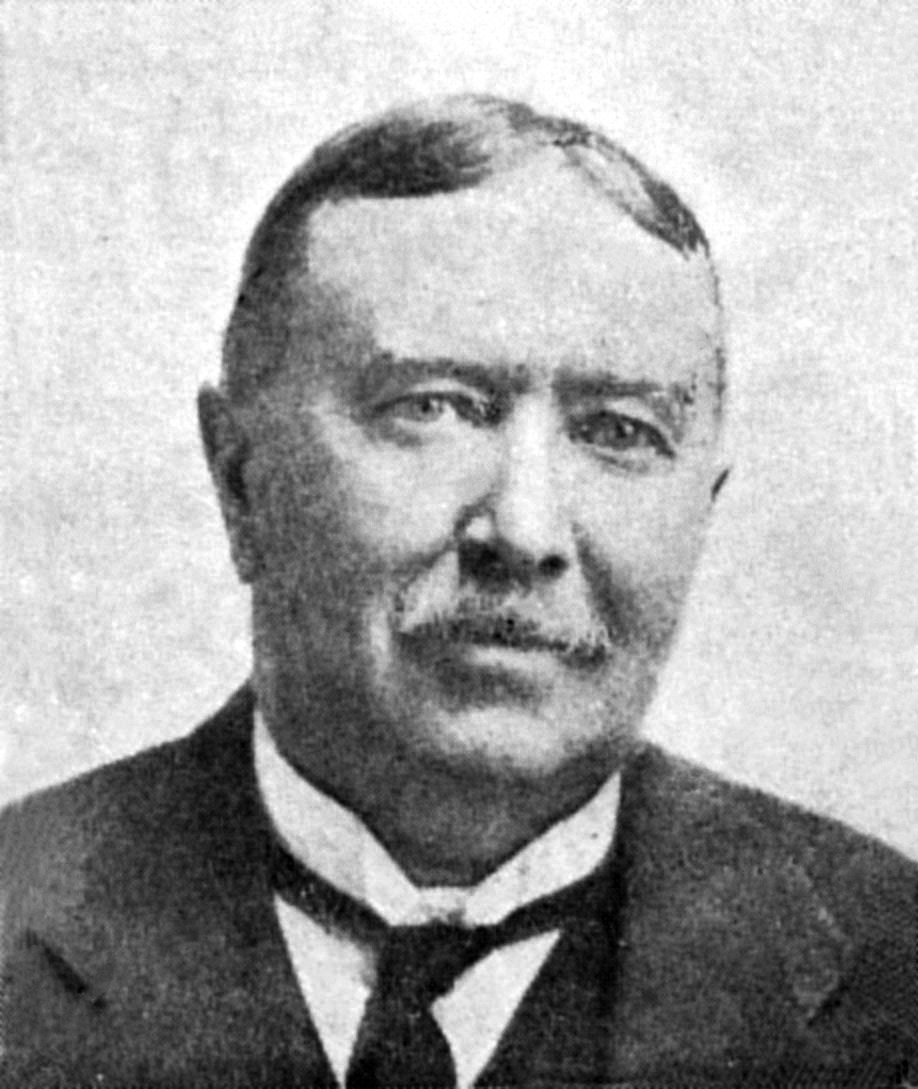
| | First party | Second party |
|---|---|---|
| Leader | Charles Coghlan | Lawrence John Walter Keller |
| Party | Rhodesia Party | Labour |
| Leader since | 1923 | 1923 |
| Leader's seat | Bulawayo North | Bulawayo South (Unelected) |
| Seats won | 26 | 0 |
| Popular vote | 13,987 | 3,527 |
| Percentage | 58.33% | 14.71% |
Premier before election
Charles Coghlan
Rhodesia Party
Subsequent Premier
Charles Coghlan
Rhodesia Party

General elections were held in Southern Rhodesia on 29 April 1924, the first elections to the new Legislative Assembly following the granting of responsible government to the colony. The result was a comprehensive victory for the Rhodesia Party, which had been formed by the supporters of responsible government, who won 26 out of the 30 seats.

== Electoral system ==
No change was made to the basic electoral procedure which continued to be the single non-transferable vote, or First past the post system, cast by means of the secret ballot.

The Letters Patent granting the colony the right to self-government in 1923 made no change to the pre-existing franchise. The law provided that voters must have been resident in Southern Rhodesia for at least six months, and have the ability to complete the claim form for the electoral register in their own handwriting if the registrar required, and to write from dictation 50 words in the English language. In addition, voters had to meet one of three criteria for their financial means: either occupy property worth £150 in their Electoral District, or own a registered mining claim within the colony (for which residence was not required), or receive annual salary of £100 in the colony.

The Letters Patent created a legislative assembly with 30 members, and for simplicity the 15 electoral districts set the previous year for the Legislative Council were used for the new assembly, but with each district returning two members. Voters were therefore entitled to two votes.

== Political parties ==
Since the previous election, and the grant of responsible government, the Responsible Government Association had organised itself under the leadership of Sir Charles Coghlan into the Rhodesia Party and been appointed as the new government. In addition the Rhodesia Labour Party, which had been formed some years before, entered into the election. However a substantial number of candidates fought as Independents on their own record. In general these candidates represented small farmers, small businesses and mining interests.

== Campaign ==
The Labour Party had supported the Responsible Government Association in its campaign for a separate government for the colony, and in opposition to union with South Africa, and members of both parties hoped to reach agreement on an allocation of seats between them so that they did not oppose each other. Negotiations were unsuccessful and where candidates of the parties were fighting for seats, the fight between them became bitter. The independent candidates were also in opposition to the 'establishment' party and many stressed the need for a strong opposition in the new Assembly.

== Results ==
| Party | Votes | % | Seats |
|---|---|---|---|
| Rhodesia Party | 13,987 | 58.33 | 26 |
| Rhodesia Labour Party | 3,527 | 14.71 | 0 |
| Independents | 6,466 | 26.96 | 4 |
| Total | 23,980 | 100.00 | 30 |
| Valid votes | 11,990 | 98.46 | |
| Invalid/blank votes | 187 | 1.54 | |
| Total votes | 12,177 | 100.00 | |
| Registered voters/turnout | 20,060 | 60.70 | |
Source: Willson

=== By constituency ===
| Constituency Electorate and turnout | Candidate | Party | Votes |
|---|---|---|---|
| BULAWAYO CENTRAL; 1,493 (54.8%) | †Francis Leslie Hadfield | RP | 420 |
| BULAWAYO CENTRAL; 1,493 (54.8%) | James Cowden | RP | 397 |
| BULAWAYO CENTRAL; 1,493 (54.8%) | Septimus Leonard John Steggall | Lab | 249 |
| BULAWAYO CENTRAL; 1,493 (54.8%) | Harry Joseph Sonnenberg | Ind | 217 |
| BULAWAYO CENTRAL; 1,493 (54.8%) | William George Durbin Morsman | Lab | 194 |
| BULAWAYO CENTRAL; 1,493 (54.8%) | Frederick Fisher | Ind | 159 |
| BULAWAYO DISTRICT; 1,253 (62.3%) | Frederic Philip Mennell | RP | 499 |
| BULAWAYO DISTRICT; 1,253 (62.3%) | Alexander Robert Thomson | RP | 492 |
| BULAWAYO DISTRICT; 1,253 (62.3%) | Harry Herbert Davies | Lab | 335 |
| BULAWAYO DISTRICT; 1,253 (62.3%) | George Walter Price | Lab | 234 |
| BULAWAYO NORTH; 1,490 (62.9%) | †Sir Charles Patrick John Coghlan | RP | 830 |
| BULAWAYO NORTH; 1,490 (62.9%) | Robert James Hudson | RP | 771 |
| BULAWAYO NORTH; 1,490 (62.9%) | William Davies | Lab | 274 |
| BULAWAYO SOUTH; 1,486 (69.0%) | Charles Folliot Birney | RP | 631 |
| BULAWAYO SOUTH; 1,486 (69.0%) | Henry Robert Barbour | RP | 469 |
| BULAWAYO SOUTH; 1,486 (69.0%) | Lawrence John Walter Keller | Lab | 408 |
| BULAWAYO SOUTH; 1,486 (69.0%) | George Mitchell | Ind | 303 |
| BULAWAYO SOUTH; 1,486 (69.0%) | Robert John Dent | Lab | 241 |
| EASTERN; 1,617 (64.2%) | Charles Edward Gilfillan | Ind | 590 |
| EASTERN; 1,617 (64.2%) | John Louis Martin | Ind | 576 |
| EASTERN; 1,617 (64.2%) | Lewis Aloys MacDonald Hastings | RP | 552 |
| EASTERN; 1,617 (64.2%) | William Matthias Longden | RP | 359 |
| GWELO; 1,456 (66.0%) | David Campbell Duncan Munro | RP | 572 |
| GWELO; 1,456 (66.0%) | Max Danziger | RP | 527 |
| GWELO; 1,456 (66.0%) | John Charles Jesser Coope | Ind | 401 |
| GWELO; 1,456 (66.0%) | James Henry Edwards | Ind | 257 |
| GWELO; 1,456 (66.0%) | James White Ross | Lab | 165 |
| HARTLEY; 1,519 (58.2%) | Sir Ernest William Sanders Montagu | Ind | 426 |
| HARTLEY; 1,519 (58.2%) | Osmond Charteris Du Port | RP | 422 |
| HARTLEY; 1,519 (58.2%) | Richard Wright Albertson | Ind | 379 |
| HARTLEY; 1,519 (58.2%) | Burton Ireland Collings | RP | 275 |
| HARTLEY; 1,519 (58.2%) | Robert Hawker Futter | Ind | 267 |
| MAZOE; 1,351 (50.4%) | Sir Francis James Newton | RP | 624 |
| MAZOE; 1,351 (50.4%) | John Wallace Downie | RP | 579 |
| MAZOE; 1,351 (50.4%) | William Martin | Lab | 159 |
| MIDLANDS; 1,321 (70.6%) | †Robert Dunipace Gilchrist | RP | 415 |
| MIDLANDS; 1,321 (70.6%) | †William James Boggie | RP | 307 |
| MIDLANDS; 1,321 (70.6%) | John Austen | Ind | 307 |
| MIDLANDS; 1,321 (70.6%) | Henry Tyndall Brett | Ind | 260 |
| MIDLANDS; 1,321 (70.6%) | William Harrison | Lab | 184 |
| MIDLANDS; 1,321 (70.6%) | Miss Ellen Constance Steedman | Ind | 150 |
| MIDLANDS; 1,321 (70.6%) | †Walter Douglas Douglas-Jones | Ind | 130 |
| MIDLANDS; 1,321 (70.6%) | George Alexander Campbell | Lab | 111 |
| NORTHERN; 1,387 (54.7%) | †William Muter Leggate | RP | 612 |
| NORTHERN; 1,387 (54.7%) | James Murdoch Eaton | RP | 608 |
| NORTHERN; 1,387 (54.7%) | †John McChlery | Ind | 296 |
| SALISBURY NORTH; 1,876 | Percival Donald Leslie Fynn | RP | unopposed |
| SALISBURY NORTH; 1,876 | Godfrey Martin Huggins | RP | unopposed |
| SALISBURY SOUTH; 1,454 (58.1%) | Harry Bertin | RP | 595 |
| SALISBURY SOUTH; 1,454 (58.1%) | George Frederick Elcombe | RP | 433 |
| SALISBURY SOUTH; 1,454 (58.1%) | Milton Evan Cleveland | Ind | 329 |
| SALISBURY SOUTH; 1,454 (58.1%) | George Harold Johnson | Ind | 208 |
| SALISBURY SOUTH; 1,454 (58.1%) | Albert Edward Wetherill | Lab | 125 |
| UMTALI; 1,598 (60.1%) | Charles Eickhoff | RP | 506 |
| UMTALI; 1,598 (60.1%) | †Mrs. Ethel Tawse Jollie | RP | 404 |
| UMTALI; 1,598 (60.1%) | William Robb Love | Lab | 378 |
| UMTALI; 1,598 (60.1%) | James Allin Methuen | Lab | 299 |
| UMTALI; 1,598 (60.1%) | Francis Rudolph Myburgh | Ind | 206 |
| UMTALI; 1,598 (60.1%) | Thomas Benjamin Hulley | Ind | 130 |
| VICTORIA; 1,353 (52.0%) | †Howard Unwin Moffat | RP | 539 |
| VICTORIA; 1,353 (52.0%) | Lucius Knapp Robinson | RP | 469 |
| VICTORIA; 1,353 (52.0%) | John Albert Halliday | Ind | 399 |
| WESTERN; 1,282 (51.8%) | †Robert Alexander Fletcher | Ind | 476 |
| WESTERN; 1,282 (51.8%) | John Parke Richardson | RP | 375 |
| WESTERN; 1,282 (51.8%) | William Elliot Thomas | RP | 306 |
| WESTERN; 1,282 (51.8%) | William Edward Green | Lab | 171 |

Note: As the Midlands result was a tie between Boggie and Austen, the election was determined by a drawing of lots, which was supervised by a Judge of the High Court, on 15 May 1924.

== Changes during the Assembly ==
=== Mazoe ===
Sir Francis Newton resigned on 26 August 1924 on appointment as High Commissioner of the United Kingdom to Southern Rhodesia, precipitating a byelection in his electoral district which was held on 26 September 1924.

| Constituency Electorate and turnout | Candidate | Party | Votes |
|---|---|---|---|
| MAZOE; 1,351 (53.6%) | Percy Sidney Inskipp | RP | 394 |
| MAZOE; 1,351 (53.6%) | John William Dunlop | Ind RP | 330 |

=== Salisbury South ===
George Elcombe resigned his seat on 10 January 1927 and a byelection was held on 8 March 1927.

| Constituency Electorate and turnout | Candidate | Party | Votes |
|---|---|---|---|
| SALISBURY SOUTH; 1,454 (64.9%) | Frank William Frederick Johnson | Ind | 406 |
| SALISBURY SOUTH; 1,454 (64.9%) | John William Dunlop | Lab | 362 |
| SALISBURY SOUTH; 1,454 (64.9%) | Burton Ireland Collings | RP | 175 |

=== Bulawayo North ===
Sir Charles Coghlan died on 28 August 1927 and a byelection was held on 18 November 1927.

| Constituency | Candidate | Party | Votes |
|---|---|---|---|
| BULAWAYO NORTH | Allan Ross Welsh | RP | 549 |
| BULAWAYO NORTH | Edward Jonathan Davies | Lab | 377 |

=== Midlands ===
William James Boggie died on 8 February 1928 and a byelection was held on 18 April 1928.

| Constituency Electorate and turnout | Candidate | Party | Votes |
|---|---|---|---|
| MIDLANDS; 1,374 (47.5%) | Arthur James Taylor | RP | 352 |
| MIDLANDS; 1,374 (47.5%) | Alexander Louis Wynand Koch Worsthorne | PP | 301 |

=== Defections ===
There were a number of changes within the assembly. Robert Dunipace Gilchrist 'crossed the floor' to sit as an opposition Independent in 1925. He was followed in May 1927 by Francis Leslie Hadfield and Max Danziger. In June 1927, the Progressive Party was formed by Harry Bertin, Robert Alexander Fletcher, Robert Dunipace Gilchrist, George Edward Gilfillan, Francis Leslie Hadfield, Frank William Frederick Johnson, John Louis Martin, Frederic Philip Mennell and Sir Ernest William Sanders Montagu. This party campaigned for a pro-white immigration policy, the development of Matabeleland, and establishing African reserves. It was opposed to monopolies, and sought reform and depoliticisation of the Civil Service.
