= List of commissioners of Bechuanaland =

This is a list of the commissioners of the Protectorate, which gained full independence as Botswana in 1966. From 1885 to 1891, the post was known as Deputy Commissioner; from 1891 to 1964 as Resident Commissioner; and from 1964 to independence as Queen's Commissioner.

In the table below, dates in italics indicate de facto continuation of office.

== List of commissioners ==
No	Portrait	Name	Tenure		Notes
British Suzerainty
Bechuanaland Protectorate
		John Mackenzie, Resident	1884	January 1885	
		Sir Charles Warren, Special Commissioner, Military Commander	23 March 1885	24 September 1885	
		Lieutenant-Colonel Frederick Carrington, Special Commissioner, Military Commander	24 September 1885	30 September 1885	
(30 September 1885 to 16 November 1885) Divided into British Bechuanaland Crown Colony (south) and Bechuanaland Protectorate (north)
		Lieutenant-Colonel Frederick Carrington, Special Commissioner, Military Commander	30 September 1885	23 October 1885	
		Sidney Godolphin Alexander Shippard, Administrator	23 October 1885	16 November 1885	
Bechuanaland Protectorate
		Sidney Godolphin Alexander Shippard, Administrator	30 September 1885	9 May 1891	knighted during tenure
Bechuanaland High Commission Territory
		Sir Sidney Godolphin Alexander Shippard, Resident Commissioner	9 May 1891	1895	
Under the High Commissioner for Southern Africa to 3 October 1963
		Francis James Newton, Resident Commissioner	1895	1897	
		Hamilton John Goold-Adams, Resident Commissioner	1897	1901	
		Sir Ralph Champneys Williams, Resident Commissioner	1901	1906	
		Francis William Panzera, Resident Commissioner	1906	1917	
		Edward Charles Frederick Garraway, Resident Commissioner	1917	1917	
		James Comyn Macgregor, Resident Commissioner	1917	1923	knighted during tenure
		Jules Ellenberger, Resident Commissioner	1923	1928	
		Rowland Mortimer Daniel, Resident Commissioner	1928	1930	
		Charles Fernand Rey, Resident Commissioner	1930	1937	
		Charles Noble Arden-Clarke, Resident Commissioner	1937	1942	
		Aubrey Denzil Forsyth-Thompson, Resident Commissioner	1942	1946	
		Anthony Sillery, Resident Commissioner	1946	1950	
		Edward Betham Beetham, Resident Commissioner	1950	1953	
		Martin Osterfield Wray, Resident Commissioner	1953	1953	
		William Forbes Mackenzie, Resident Commissioner	1954	1959	
		John Redcliffe Maud, Resident Commissioner	1959	1960	
Independence Day Republic of Botswana			30 September 1960		
		Peter Fawcus, Resident Commissioner	1960	1965	
		Hugh Selby Norman-Walker, Commissioner	1965	30 September 1966	knighted during tenure
30 September 1966					Independence Day Republic of Botswana

For continuation after independence see: Heads of State of Botswana

== Sources ==
- http://www.rulers.org/rulb1.html#botswana
- African States and Rulers, John Stewart, McFarland
- Heads of State and Government, 2nd Edition, John V da Graca, MacMillan Press 2000
- Whitaker's Almanack 1965, J. Whitaker and Sons Ltd

== See also ==
- High Commissioner for Southern Africa
- Botswana
  - Heads of state of Botswana
  - Heads of government of Botswana
  - Vice-Presidents of Botswana
- Lists of office-holders
