= Public Service Commission (Hong Kong) =

Civil service commission of Hong Kong

- 公務員敍用委員會
- Emblem of the Hong Kong SAR

Agency overview
- Formed: 1950; 76 years ago
- Jurisdiction: Government of Hong Kong
- Headquarters: 26/F, Fairmont House, 8 Cotton Tree Drive, Central, Hong Kong
- Agency executive: Rita LAU Ng Wai-lan, GBS, JP, Chairman
- Key document: Public Service Commission Ordinance
- Website: www.psc.gov.hk

Public Service Commission
- Traditional Chinese: 公務員敍用委員會
- Simplified Chinese: 公务员叙用委员会
Transcriptions
Standard Mandarin
- Hanyu Pinyin: Gōngwùyuán Xù Yòng Wěiyuánhuì
Yue: Cantonese
- Jyutping: gung1 mou6 jyun4 zeoi6 jung6 wai2 jyun4 wui6*2

The Public Service Commission (Chinese: 公務員敍用委員會) in Hong Kong is the principal statutory advisory body to the Hong Kong Chief Executive on civil service appointments, promotions and discipline. The Commission is tasked with ensuring fairness in hiring and disciplinary practices as outlined in the Public Service Commission Ordinance and Chapter 93 of the Laws of Hong Kong.

== History and remit ==
The Commission was established in 1950, with the primary aim of increasing the proportion of local Hongkongers appointed.

The Commission chairman and (currently eight) members are appointed by the Chief Executive.

Over the years since it was set up, the scope of concern of the Commission has narrowed somewhat, as the number of civil servants, and hence cases has increased - from a permanent establishment of 18,500 posts at the outset to 160,000 posts today.

In 1971, disciplinary cases came under the Commission's remit.

The Secretariat of the Public Service Commission provides day-to-day operational support.

== Chairpeople ==
Name	In office	Notes
Mr Thomas Megarry	Aug 1950 – Mar 1951	Inaugural.
Mr LO Man-kam	Mar-Apr 1951	* Acting Chairman
Mr John Robert Jones	Apr 1951 – June 1952	* Acting Chairman
Mr Justice Ernest Hillas Williams	June 1952 – May 1953	
Mr Justice Trevor Jack Gould	May 1953 – Nov 1953	
Mr John Robert Jones	Nov 1953 – Jan 1959	(also Acting Chairman Apr 1951 – June 1952)
Mr Richard Charles Lee	Jan 1959 – July 1959	
Mr E R Childe JP	July 1959 – May 1965	
Mr M S Cumming OBE, JP	June 1965 – May 1967	
Sir Charles Hartwell JP	May 1967 – Nov 1971	
Sir Ronald Holmes CMG CBE MC JP	Nov 1971 – May 1977	
Sir Donald Luddington KBE CMG CVO	May 1977 – Sept 1978	
Mr Ian MacDonald LIGHTBODY CMG, JP	Sept 1978 – Oct 1980	
Mr LI Fook-kow CMG, JP	Oct 1980 – May 1987	
Mr Eric Peter HO JP	May 1987 – June 1991	
Mr Augustine CHUI Kam JP	June 1991 – July 1996	
Mr Haider Hatim Tyebjee BARMA, CBE, ISO, GBS JP	1 Aug 1996 – Apr 2005	
Mr Nicholas NG Wing-fui GBS JP	1 May 2005 – 30 April 2014	
Ms Rita Lau	1 May 2014 – present	(appointed to 30 April 2023)

== See also ==
- Hong Kong Civil Service
