= John Wallace Downie =

The Honourable John Wallace Downie CMG
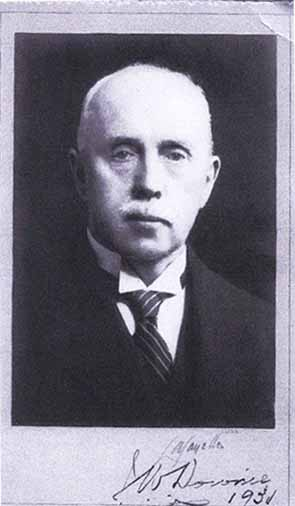

High Commissioner of Southern Rhodesia to the United Kingdom
- In office 1930–1935
- Monarch: George V
- Preceded by: Sir Francis James Newton
- Succeeded by: Stephen O'Keeffe

Member of the Southern Rhodesian Legislative Assembly for Mazoe
- In office 29 April 1924 – 28 October 1930 Serving with Newton/Inskipp (1924–28)
- Preceded by: New constituency
- Succeeded by: Edward Noakes
Ministerial offices 1924–1930
Colonial Secretary of Southern Rhodesia
In office 1 September 1924 – 2 January 1925
Premier	Charles Coghlan
Preceded by	Francis James Newton
Succeeded by	William Muter Leggate
Minister of Agriculture and Lands
In office 2 January 1925 – 14 October 1927
Premier	Charles Coghlan; Howard Unwin Moffat
Preceded by	William Muter Leggate
Succeeded by	Osmond Charteris du Port
Minister of Mines and Public Works
In office 14 October 1927 – 30 October 1930
Premier	Howard Unwin Moffat
Preceded by	Howard Unwin Moffat
Succeeded by	George Mitchell

Personal details
- Born: 1876 Hutchesontown, Glasgow, Scotland, United Kingdom
- Died: 22 August 1940 (aged 63–64) Salisbury, Southern Rhodesia
- Party: Rhodesia Party

John Wallace Downie CMG (1876 – 22 August 1940) served as High Commissioner of Southern Rhodesia from 1930 to 1935.

== Early life ==
The son of Christopher Downie, a Guard on the Caledonian Railway and later Lanark Station Master, was born on 28 December 1876 in Hutchesontown, Glasgow, emigrating to South Africa in 1897 to work on the Cape Railways. Here he worked on the line in the construction process from Bechuanaland to Bulawayo. He worked for a time as a postmaster in Francistown, Bechuanaland Protectorate. On 15 October 1899, following the declaration of the Anglo-Boer War, Downie volunteered to join the Francistown Defence Force under the leadership of Umfreville Percy Swinburne.

In 1900 he returned to Glasgow in order to study, coming back to Africa in 1901. On his return, he was appointed secretary of a small mining company. Subsequently, he joined the firm of Haddon, Cotton & Butt, a Rhodesian shipping and forwarding house, where he later rose to be managing director. He was interested in a number of gold mining ventures, and in addition to his firm acted as manager of the Portland Cement Works for some time. John Downie later sold his interests in the firm, and in 1920 he became manager of the Salisbury Farmer's Co-operative, holding this post till the period of the end of Chartered Company Rule in 1923.

== Political career ==
Downie was a keen advocate of responsible government and served as treasurer of the Responsible Government Party. Subsequently, he became Chairman of the Rhodesia Party and was responsible for much of the work of party organisation. At the first general election for the Southern Rhodesian Legislative Assembly on 29 April 1924, he was elected with Francis James Newton to the seat of Mazoe under the system of double member constituencies then in existence. On 1 September 1924, he was appointed to Premier Charles Coghlan's ministry as Colonial Secretary.

On 2 January 1925, he became Minister of Agriculture and Lands and in this capacity he played an important part in popularising Rhodesian tobacco in London, in encouraging the cotton industry and in promoting agricultural co-operative efforts. Following the replacement of Coghlan by Howard Unwin Moffat as premier, on 14 October 1927, Downie was reshuffled into the portfolio of Mines and Public Works, but continued to take a considerable interest in agricultural affairs.

John Downie was strongly critical of the management of the railways and several times clashed with the railway companies on that score. On the other hand, he was able to reach a satisfactory arrangement with the Chartered Company to solve the problems of simplifying the collection of mining revenue, and he took an important part in settling some of the differences between miners and farmers. In 1929 John Downie received the award of the Companion of the Order of St Michael and St George (CMG). Elected for a second term as the single member for Mazoe in the 1928 general election, in late 1930 Downie was appointed to be Newton's successor as the second High Commissioner for Southern Rhodesia in London, and Downie subsequently resigned from the ministry and his legislative assembly seat on 30 October 1930. On 4 November 1930, he was granted retention for life of the title The Honourable.

== Later life ==
Downie served as High Commissioner for Southern Rhodesia in London until 1935, when he retired to become Chairman of Rhodesia and Nyasaland Airways. He was a member of the Southern Rhodesian delegation to the Imperial Economic Conference at Ottawa in 1932. In 1939 he returned to the work of administrator as Controller of Suppliers.

John Wallace Downie died on 22 August 1940 in Salisbury Hospital. He left considerable estate and in his will endowed the John Downie Bursaries for Prince Edward School and the Girls High School, Salisbury. He left a widow, Clara Mortimer Carrol (1884–1964) and two children, Clara Isabella Ross Downie (1912–1977) and Robert Gordon Downie (1918–1944).

Southern Rhodesian Legislative Assembly
New constituency	Member of Parliament for Mazoe; 1924–1930; Served alongside: Newton/Inskipp (1924–28)	Succeeded by Edward Noakes
Political offices
Preceded by Francis James Newton	Colonial Secretary of Southern Rhodesia; 1924–1925	Succeeded by William Muter Leggate
Preceded by William Muter Leggate	Minister of Agriculture and Lands; 1925–1927	Succeeded by Osmond Charteris du Port
Preceded by Howard Unwin Moffat	Minister of Mines and Public Works; 1927–1930	Succeeded by George Mitchell
Diplomatic posts
Preceded by Sir Francis James Newton	High Commissioner of Southern Rhodesia to the United Kingdom; 1930–1935	Succeeded by Stephen O'Keeffe
