= Ian MacDonald Lightbody =

Scottish-born Hong Kong civil servant

Ian MacDonald Lightbody, CMG, JP (19 August 1921 – 10 March 2015) was a Scottish-born Hong Kong civil servant and government official. He was the first Secretary for Housing from 1973 to 1977 and official member of the Legislative Council of Hong Kong and Executive Council of Hong Kong.

Lightbody graduated from the University of Glasgow in 1946 with a Master of Arts degree. He was appointed District Commissioner, New Territories in 1967, Defence Secretary in 1968 and Commissioner for Resettlement from 1971 to 1972. In 1973, he was appointed the first Secretary for Housing in which he served until 1977 and was appointed Secretary for Administration. He acted as Chief Secretary of Hong Kong in 1978. Lightbody was also an official member of the Legislative Council of Hong Kong and Executive Council of Hong Kong. For his public services, he was invested as a Companion of the Order of St Michael and St George (CMG) in the 1974 New Year Honours.

Lightbody retired from the Hong Kong Government in 1978 and was appointed chairman of the Public Service Commission. He retired to the United Kingdom in 1980.

Government offices
Preceded by Jack Cater	Defence Secretary; 1968–1969	Succeeded by George Peter Lloyd as Secretary for Security
New title	Secretary for Housing; 1973–1977	Succeeded by Alan James Scott
