= Francis Noel Ashley =

British colonial administrator

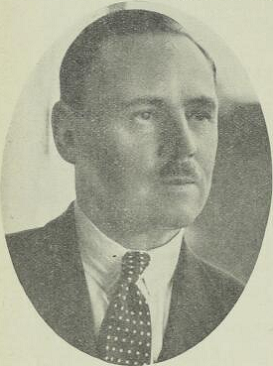

Resident Commissioner of Southern Provinces of Nigeria
- In office 1924–1938

Resident Commissioner of the Solomon Islands
- In office 1929–1939
- Preceded by: Richard Rutledge Kane
- Succeeded by: William Sydney Marchant

Personal details
- Born: 1884
- Died: 1976

Francis Noel Ashley CMG (1884–1976) was a British colonial administrator. He served as the Resident Commissioner of Southern Provinces of Nigeria from 1924 until 1928, and as Resident Commissioner of the Solomon Islands between 1929 and 1939.

== Biography ==
Ashley was born in 1884 and attended Westminster School. He joined the Royal Sussex Militia Artillery in 1902, before transferring to the Cape Colonial Mounted Forces in 1904. In 1908 he joined the Nigerian political service as a cadet, where he remained until starting service with the West African Frontier Force in 1915. In 1913 he married Marjorie Robinson; the couple had one daughter.

In 1924 he was appointed Resident Commissioner of the Southern Provinces of Nigeria. He remained in post until 1928, and the following year he became Resident Commissioner of the Solomon Islands. He was made a Companion of the Order of St Michael and St George (CMG) in the 1937 Coronation Honours.

He went on leave from his post in April 1939. In 1940 he joined the Royal Air Force Volunteer Reserve, serving as a Squadron Leader until 1944. Between 1944 and 1946 he worked for the government of the Bahamas.
