= Simbarashe Mumbengegwi =

Zimbabwean politician and diplomat

The Right Honourable Simbarashe Mumbengegwi
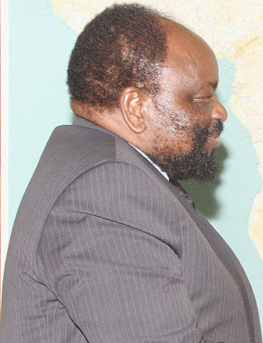

Senior Advisor to President of Zimbabwe
- Incumbent
- Assumed office 30 November 2017
- President: Emmerson Mnangagwa
- Preceded by: Office established

Minister of Foreign Affairs
- In office 27 November 2017 – 30 November 2017; Acting
- President: Emmerson Mnangagwa
- Preceded by: Walter Mzembi
- Succeeded by: Sibusiso Moyo
- In office 15 April 2005 – 9 October 2017
- President: Robert Mugabe
- Prime Minister: Morgan Tsvangirai
- Preceded by: Stan Mudenge
- Succeeded by: Walter Mzembi

Minister of Macro-Economic Planning and Investment Promotion
- In office 9 October 2017 – 27 November 2017
- President: Robert Mugabe

Personal details
- Born: 20 July 1945 (age 81) Chivi, Southern Rhodesia
- Education: Monash University

Simbarashe Simbanenduku Mumbengegwi (born 20 July 1945) is a Zimbabwean politician and diplomat currently serving as Minister of State for Presidential Affairs and Monitoring Government Programmes. Previously he was acting Foreign Minister for a few days following the resignation of former President Robert Mugabe. He had previously served as Zimbabwe's Minister of Foreign Affairs from 2005 to 2017. From October to November 2017, he was Minister of Macro-Economic Planning and Investment Promotion.

== Life and career ==
Mumbengegwi was born in Chivi, Zimbabwe (then Southern Rhodesia). After receiving his primary and secondary education in Zimbabwe, he attended Monash University in Melbourne, Australia, in the late 1960s and 1970s. Invariably known as Simba, he was the popular and affable president of the African Students Association, and also worked as a teacher. He was a ZANU activist in exile at that time and served as a ZANU representative during the 1970s: he was Deputy ZANU Chief Representative in Australia and the Far East from 1973 to 1976, then Chief Representative in Australia and the Far East from 1976 to 1978, and Chief Representative to Zambia from 1978 to 1980.

From 1980 to 1990, he was a member of parliament in the House of Assembly of Zimbabwe from the Midlands Province, and he was the Deputy Speaker and Chairman of Committees of the House of Assembly from 1980 to 1981. He joined the Cabinet as Deputy Minister of Foreign Affairs in 1981, serving in that position until 1982, when he became Minister of Water Resources and Development. Later in the same year, he was moved to the position of Minister of National Housing, in which position he remained for two years. He was then Minister of Public Construction and National Housing from 1984 to 1988 and Minister of Transport from 1988 to 1990.

From 1981 to 1984, he was Provincial Treasurer of ZANU-PF for the Midlands Province. From 1984 to 1994, he was a member of the Central Committee of ZANU-PF, and he was the Central Committee's Deputy Secretary for Publicity and Information from 1984 to 1989.

Mumbengegwi was Zimbabwe's Permanent Representative to the United Nations from 1990 to 1995; while there, he was vice-president of the United Nations General Assembly from 1990 to 1991 as well as a member of the United Nations Security Council from 1991 to 1992. He twice served as President of the Security Council, in February 1991 and April 1992. He was subsequently Ambassador to Belgium, the Netherlands, Luxembourg and Permanent Representative to the European Communities in 1995. He later became High Commissioner to the United Kingdom and Ambassador to Ireland in 1999, remaining there until 2005 (although he became Ambassador to the United Kingdom rather than High Commissioner in 2003, upon Zimbabwe's withdrawal from the Commonwealth of Nations).

He became a Non-Constituency Member of Parliament in 2005. On 15 April 2005, he was appointed as Minister of Foreign Affairs in a cabinet reshuffle, replacing Stan Mudenge.

In the March 2008 parliamentary election, Mumbengegwi was nominated by ZANU-PF as its candidate for the Senate seat from Shurugwi-Zvishavane in the Midlands. He won the seat according to official results, receiving 24,055 votes against 11,988 for Vincent Gwarazimba of the Movement for Democratic Change (MDC).

When the ZANU-PF–MDC national unity government was sworn in on 13 February 2009, Mumbengegwi was retained as Minister of Foreign Affairs.

== See also ==
- List of foreign ministers in 2017
- List of current foreign ministers

Diplomatic posts
Preceded by Ngoni Chideya	High Commissioner of Zimbabwe to the United Kingdom; 1999–2003	Renamed Ambassador
New title	Ambassador of Zimbabwe to the United Kingdom; 2003–2005	Succeeded by Gabriel Machinga
