= Peter Fawcus =

British colonial administrator

Sir Robert Peter Fawcus KBE CMG

Queen's Commissioner of Bechuanaland
- In office 1 August 1964 – 1965
- Preceded by: none
- Succeeded by: Hugh Norman-Walker

Resident Commissioner of Bechuanaland
- In office 1960 – 1 August 1964
- Preceded by: John Redcliffe-Maud
- Succeeded by: himself, as Queen's Commissioner

Personal details
- Born: 30 September 1915
- Died: 22 April 2003 (age 87)

Sir Robert Peter Fawcus KBE CMG (30 September 1915 – 22 April 2003) was a British colonial administrator in Bechuanaland Protectorate.

Educated at Cambridge University, Fawcus was Government Secretary for Bechuanaland from 1954 to 1959, Resident Commissioner of Bechuanaland from 1959 to 1963 and Queen's Commissioner from 1963 to 1965. He prepared the way for Botswana's independence in 1966.
