= Aubrey Denzil Forsyth-Thompson =

British colonial administrator

Aubrey Denzil Forsyth-Thompson, CMG, CVO, CBE (3 October 1897 – 13 June 1982) was a Colony of Natal-born British colonial administrator who served as British Resident Commissioner in Bechuanaland and Basutoland.

== Life and career ==
The son of Ernest Alfred Thompson, Aubrey Denzil Forsyth-Thompson was born in Natal and grew up on a farm in the Mooi Riverarea. He was educated at Weenan County College in Mooi River, which his parents founded and where they taught. In 1917, he went to England to join the British Army, and was commissioned a second lieutenant in the Royal Field Artillery, seeing combat in France.

In 1919, he left the Army and went to New College, Oxford, to study for a shortened degree in Modern History, graduating BA in 1920.

Forsyth-Thompson joined the British Colonial Service in 1921, and was posted to Uganda. In 1937, he was transferred to the Bechuanaland Protectorate as Assistant Resident Commissioner and Government Secretary, and in 1942 he was promoted to Resident Commissioner for Bechuanaland. In 1946, he was transferred to Basutoland as Resident Commissioner. He retired in 1951. He was appointed CBE in 1941, CMG in 1944, and CVO in 1947.

== Family ==
Forsyth-Thompson married Kathleen Esther Murray in 1942; they had three children, all born in Uganda.
