= Sidney Shippard =

British colonial administrator & barrister (1837–1902)

Sir Sidney Shippard KCMG

Resident Commissioner of Bechuanaland
- In office 1885–1895
- Monarch: Queen Victoria
- Preceded by: first officeholder
- Succeeded by: Francis James Newton

Personal details
- Born: 29 May 1837 Brussels, Belgium
- Died: 29 March 1902 (aged 64) London
- Spouse(s): Maria Stockenström (m. 1864; died 1870) Rosalind Ayshford Sanford (m. 1894)
- Education: King's College School

Sir Sidney Godolphin Alexander Shippard, KCMG (29 May 1837 – 29 March 1902) was a British barrister and colonial administrator, who served as Resident Commissioner of the Bechuanaland Protectorate 1885–1895.

== Early life and career ==
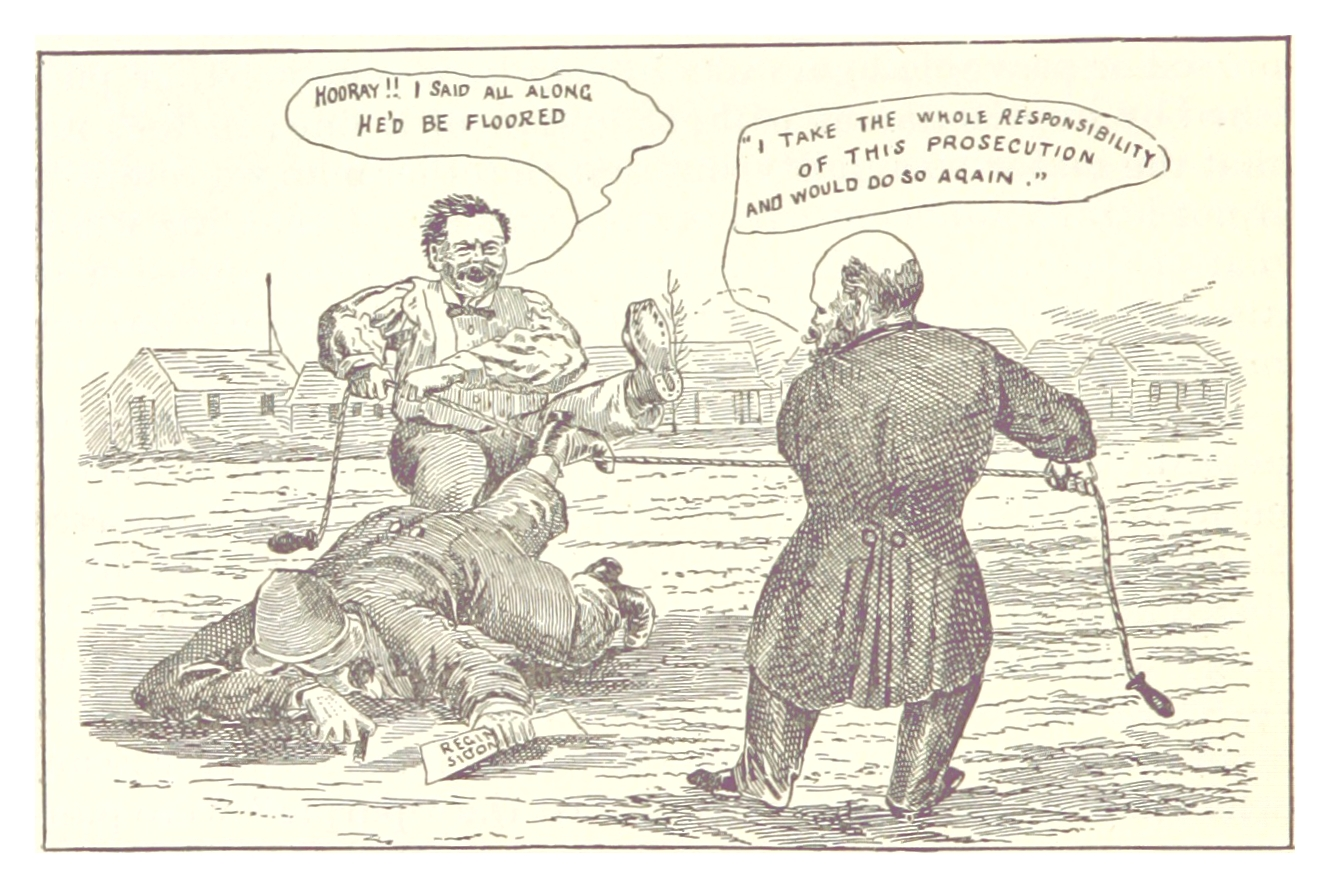
Caricature showing Shippard (bald with beard) and R.W. "Limner" Murray tripping up the Lieutenant Governor of Griqualand West, Major William Owen Lanyon

Shippard was the eldest son of Captain William Shippard, 29th Regiment (son of Rear Admiral Alexander Shippard), and Elizabeth Lydia Peters (daughter of Captain Joseph Peters). He was educated at King's College School and Oxford. Taking his degree in 1863, he was called to the bar as a member of the Inner Temple in 1867.

He then entered upon a long career in South Africa. He was attorney-general of Griqualand West from 1873 until 1877, when he was made acting recorder of the High Court of Griqualand. The next year, after clashes with the new Governor Henry Bartle Frere and the Lieutenant Governor of Griqualand West Sir William Owen Lanyon, he retired from the position.

From 1880 to 1885 he sat as a judge of the Supreme Court of the Cape Colony; and he was British commissioner on the Anglo-German commission in 1884-1885 for settling the claims of British subjects at Lüderitz Bay (German: Lüderitzbucht) and other parts of the south-west coast.

== Bechuanaland ==
Shippard, while at Oxford in 1878, had discussed with Cecil Rhodes the plan of the projected British advance in south central Africa. He saw in the German annexation of Damaraland and Namaqualand the first step in a design to secure for Germany territory stretching from ocean to ocean – a design which if executed would have been fatal to the British position in South Africa. Consequently, when after the Warren expedition of 1885 he was chosen to organize the newly acquired British possessions in Bechuanaland he saw in his appointment an opportunity for forestalling the Germans, and also the Boer adventurers who likewise sought to be beforehand with Britain in the countries north of the Limpopo.

From his first establishment in Bechuanaland he kept up a friendly correspondence with the Matabele king Lobengula with the object of attaching him to the British cause. At the end of 1887 he went to Graham's Town with the hope of inducing the high commissioner (Sir Hercules Robinson afterwards Lord Rosmead) to sanction the conclusion of a treaty with Lobengula binding that ruler not to cede any part of his territory to any other power than England. "I used all my power of persuasion," Sir Sidney writes, "but failed to induce Lord Rosmead either to act on his own responsibility in the matter or to approach Her Majesty's government on the subject. As a last resource I telegraphed to Mr Rhodes, who was then busily engaged at Kimberley, to come down at once to Graham's Town and try the effect of his eloquence. He came, and by taking upon himself all pecuniary responsibility succeeded in obtaining the requisite sanction" (see article "Bechuanaland," by Sir S Shippard, in British Africa, London, 1899). The treaty was signed and British interests secured.

Shippard was thenceforth freer to devote himself to the special interests of Bechuanaland, which he governed with conspicuous success. He held the chief official position there from 1885 to 1895, being administrator, chief magistrate and president of the Land Commission for British Bechuanaland, and resident commissioner of the Bechuanaland Protectorate and the Kalahari. He was created Knight Commander of the Order of St Michael and St George (KCMG) in 1887. In 1896 he played an unofficial part in the negotiations between Sir Hercules Robinson and the Johannesburg reformers after the Jameson Raid. He then returned to England, where he died in London on 29 March 1902.

== Family ==
Shippard was twice married. First, in 1864, Maria Stockenström, daughter of Sir Andries Stockenström. After her early death in 1870, he remarried Rosalind Ayshford Sanford, daughter of William Ayshford Sanford, of Nynehead Court, Somerset. Lady Shippard died in 1935.
