= Francis James Newton =

British colonial administrator (1857–1948)

Sir Francis James Newton KCMG CVO
- Newton in 1925

Resident Commissioner of Bechuanaland
- In office 19 November 1895 – December 1897
- Monarch: Victoria
- Preceded by: Sidney Shippard
- Succeeded by: Hamilton Goold-Adams

1st High Commissioner of Southern Rhodesia to the United Kingdom
- In office 1 September 1924 – October 1930
- Succeeded by: John Wallace Downie

Member of the Southern Rhodesian Legislative Council (Nominated member)
- In office 17 March 1902 – 30 April 1920
- Succeeded by: Percival Donald Leslie Fynn
- In office 1 October 1923 – 30 May 1924
- Preceded by: Sir Ernest Montagu

Member of the Southern Rhodesian Legislative Assembly for Mazoe
- In office 30 May 1924 – 26 August 1924 Serving with John Wallace Downie
- Preceded by: New constituency
- Succeeded by: Percy Sydney Inskipp

Personal details
- Born: 1857 Saint Croix, Danish West Indies
- Died: 8 May 1948 (aged 90–91) Bindura, Southern Rhodesia
- Spouse: Henrietta Joanna Strachey Cloete (m. 1889)
- Relatives: William Newton (grandfather); Alfred Newton (uncle); Edward Newton (uncle)
- Education: Rugby School
- Alma mater: University College, Oxford
- Occupation: Barrister; colonial administrator

Sir Francis James Newton KCMG CVO (1857 – 8 May 1948) was a senior colonial administrator in different parts of the British Empire, principally in Southern Rhodesia (now Zimbabwe).

== Early life ==
He was the son of Francis Rodes Newton (1827–1886), an English planter from Elveden Hall in Suffolk, and his Danish wife Anna Louisa (1833–1862), daughter of Major Jacob Heitmann Gyllich, Knight of the Dannebrog, and his wife Adriana Louise von Meley, daughter of Frederik Christian von Meley. His English grandfather was William Newton MP, while among his uncles were the scientist Alfred Newton, the colonial administrator Sir Edward Newton and the Army officer General Sir William Samuel Newton.

== Career ==
After graduating with an MA, he worked in the Cape Colony, first as private secretary to the Prime Minister, Thomas Charles Scanlen, and then as aide-de-camp and private secretary to the Governor, Sir Hercules Robinson. Adding a legal qualification to his skills, he became a barrister of the Inner Temple in 1890.

In 1890 he was appointed Colonial Secretary and Receiver General of British Bechuanaland, followed in 1895 by the post of Resident Commissioner of the Bechuanaland Protectorate, now Botswana, but after the Jameson Raid was dismissed. In 1898 he received the post of Colonial Secretary of British Honduras, now Belize, after which, staying in the Caribbean, in 1901 he became Colonial Secretary of Barbados, receiving appointment to the Colony's Legislative Council. Returning to Southern Africa, he was nominated to the Legislative Council of Southern Rhodesia in 1903 and appointed Treasurer. For a spell in 1914 he was Acting Administrator of Southern Rhodesia. In 1923 he was appointed Colonial Secretary of Southern Rhodesia and in the 1924 election to the Assembly came top of the poll for the constituency of Mazoe (as it was then spelled). However he resigned on 26 August 1924 on appointment as High Commissioner of Southern Rhodesia to the United Kingdom, a post he held until he was succeeded by John Wallace Downie in 1930.

== Honours ==
In the 1892 New Year Honours he was appointed a Companion of the Order of St Michael and St George (CMG). In 1911 he received appointment as a Commander of the Royal Victorian Order (CVO) and finally in 1919 the award of a Knight Commander of the Order of St Michael and St George (KCMG).

== Family ==
In 1889 in the Cape Colony he married Henrietta, the daughter of Daniel Cloete, an Afrikaner brewer who sat on the Legislative Council. Her sister Anna Evangeline was the wife of Major-General Sir Edward Northey. Their only child to reach adulthood, Charles Hercules Francis Augustus Newton, an officer in the King's Royal Rifle Corps, was killed in action in Belgium in 1916.

In Southern Rhodesia he owned the Pimento Park plantation at Mazowe, which was inherited by his great-nephew Oliver Newton. He died in the hospital at Bindura and his will was proved in London on 22 September 1948.

== Portraits ==
Portraits of Francis and of his wife Henrietta are in the National Portrait Gallery, London.

Government offices
Preceded by Sidney Shippard	Resident Commissioner of Bechuanaland; 1895–1897	Succeeded by Hamilton Goold-Adams
Preceded by Sir Ernest Sweet-Escott	Colonial Secretary of British Honduras; 1898–1901	Succeeded by
Preceded by Sir Ralph Champneys Williams	Colonial Secretary of Barbados; 1901–1902	Succeeded by Sir Samuel Knaggs
New title	Treasurer of Southern Rhodesia; 1903–1919	Succeeded by Percival Donald Leslie Fynn
Political offices
New title	Colonial Secretary of Southern Rhodesia; 1923–1924	Succeeded by John Wallace Downie
Southern Rhodesian Legislative Assembly
New constituency	Member of Parliament for Mazoe; 1924; Served alongside: Downie	Succeeded by Percy Sydney Inskipp
Diplomatic posts
New title	High Commissioner of Southern Rhodesia to the United Kingdom; 1924–1930	Succeeded by John Wallace Downie
