= Fairfield, Stogursey =

Fairfield
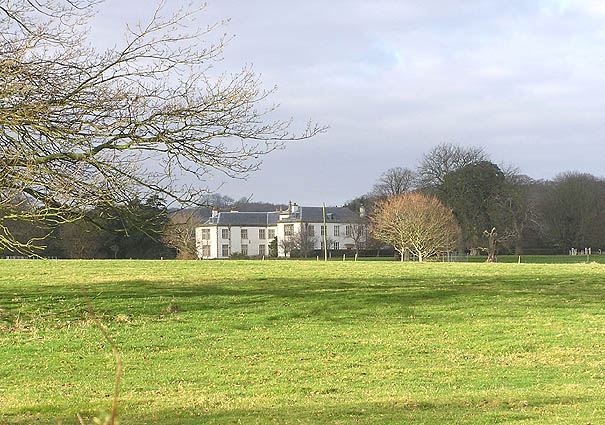

- Location within Somerset
- 51°10′51″N 3°09′50″W
- Location: Stogursey, Somerset, England

History
- Built: 16th century

Site notes
- Owner: Elizabeth Gass

Listed Building – Grade II*
- Official name: Fairfield House
- Designated: 22 May 1969
- Reference no.: 1175243

Fairfield House is a historic house in Stogursey, Somerset, England. A house existed on the site from the 12th century and it has been owned by the same family since that time. The current building is largely 16th-century, but has undergone various remodellings since then. It is designated as a Grade II* listed building.

The house was surrounded by a Medieval deer park covering approximately 200 acres (81 ha). Part of this was converted into an Elizabethan garden around 1580, and now includes a walled garden. The current owner is Elizabeth Gass who has sold some of the surrounding parkland to Hinkley Point Power station.

== History ==
A manor house existed on the site in 1166. Little is known about the original house, but the ownership is given as lying with the Russel family by 1216. The house was considered to be in the Lilstock parish in 1498 when John Verney, a descendant of Russel, paid a fine for his support of Perkin Warbeck. The house has remained in the ownership of their descendants ever since.

Around 1473 a licence was granted by the king to William Verney to surround the house with a wall and seven round towers. Three of the towers were still surviving in the 18th century; however none remain today.

There was a separate chapel from 1288 until the 17th century, but its location is now unknown.

In the 16th century it was remodelled by Elizabeth Verney including a porch which dates from 1589; however, the house was still described as unfinished in 1633. This may have been because parts of the earlier house built around a courtyard were in the process of being demolished.

In the 18th century the interior was remodeled with the addition of new staircases in each main wing. In the late 18th and early 19th century Sir John Acland made further changes which are believed to have been designed by Richard Carver.

By 1870 Alexander Acland-Hood controlled the estate.

In 1967 Elizabeth Gass inherited from an uncle the family's ancestral seat, and gave up her teaching career to concentrate on managing the estate which came with it. She was the Lord Lieutenant of Somerset between 1998 and 2015.

=== Sale of land ===
In 1994, Lady Gass, sold some 230 acres of her land on the coast beneath the Quantock Hills for about £50 million. The land was the part of her Fairfield estate lying immediately to the west of the Hinkley Point power station and was earmarked for the development of a wind farm. The site is now (2018) being used for the construction of two new nuclear reactors at Hinkley Point C.

== Architecture ==
Parts of the two-storey house still have fabric from the 12th-century building, but most of it dates from around 1589, with the south front being remodelled in the late 18th century. Like many Elizabethan mansions, is built in an 'E' shape. The stone work has lime rendering with Bath Stone dressings, topped by a hipped slate roof.

The house and gardens are occasionally opened to the public.

== Garden and outbuildings ==
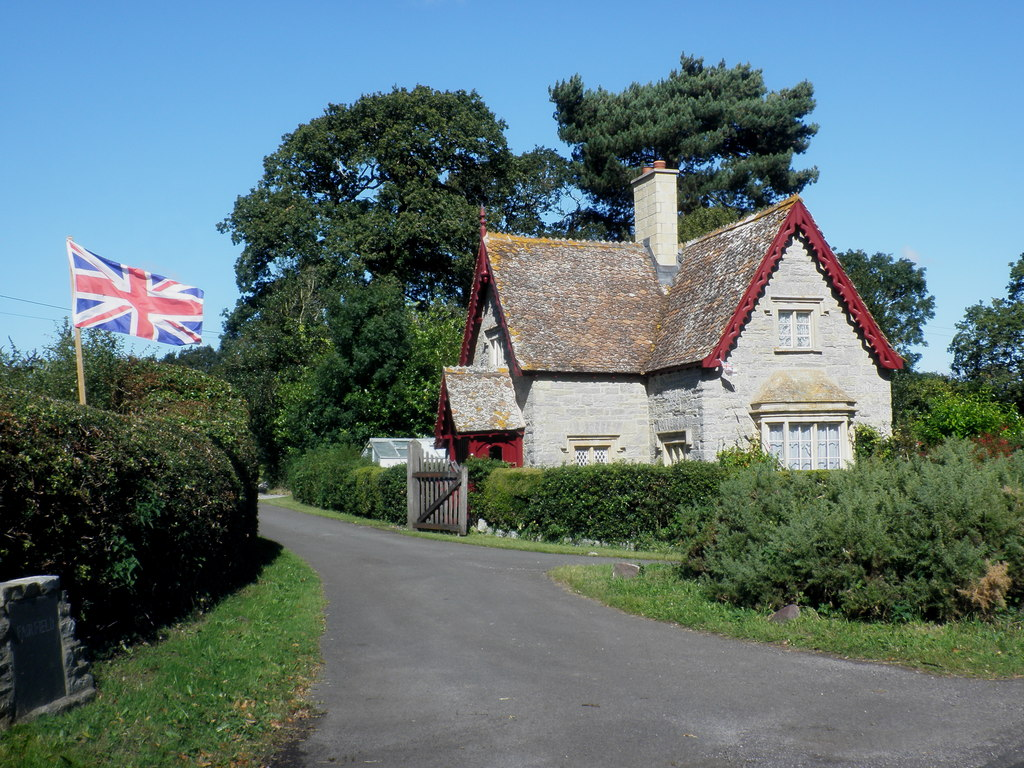
Fairfield Lodge at the entrance to the estate

The house is set in parkland laid out in the 18th century which had been a deer park in the 15th century, when the whole estate covered approximately 200 acres (81 ha). A late Elizabethan garden was established as part of the remodelling of the house by Elizabeth Verney in 1580.

The grounds included a short canal which was separated from the house by the main road from Stogursey to Stringston. In the late 18th century and early 19th century, the road was diverted by Sir John Acland, as part of extending the park to the south. The east and south lodges were rebuilt in the 1830s. There are also a stable block and dovecote both of which date from the late 18th century.

The Blue Lias barn and granary to the north of the house were built in the 18th century. The barn had a new roof in the 19th.

A woodland garden has spring flowers beneath shrubs and trees; there are also apple orchards. The walled kitchen garden includes roses and a herbaceous border. An earlier maze has been recreated with a paved replica. The garden is open occasionally as part of the National Gardens Scheme.

The estate now covers approximately 99 acres (40 ha), and is listed, Grade II, on the Register of Historic Parks and Gardens of special historic interest in England.

== Bibliography ==
- Bond, James (1998). Somerset parks and gardens: A landscape history. Tiverton: Somerset Books. p. 50. ISBN 978-0861834655.
- Dunning, Robert (1991). Some Somerset Country Houses. Wimborne: Dovecote Press. ISBN 978-0946159857.
