= Edgeworth David (colonial administrator) =

Colonial Administrator

Sir Edgeworth David KBE CMG

2nd Chief Secretary of Singapore
- In office 1958 – 2 June 1959
- Preceded by: Sir William Goode
- Succeeded by: Position abolished

Governor of Hong Kong
- Acting
- In office 31 December 1957 – 23 January 1958
- Monarch: Elizabeth II
- Colonial Secretary: Himself
- Preceded by: Sir Alexander Grantham
- Succeeded by: Sir Robin Black

Colonial Secretary of Hong Kong
- In office 4 May 1955 – 24 January 1958
- Monarch: Elizabeth II
- Governor: Sir Alexander Grantham; Sir Robin Black
- Preceded by: Sir Robin Black
- Succeeded by: Claude Bramall Burgess

Personal details
- Born: 12 June 1908 London, United Kingdom
- Died: 15 May 1965 (aged 56) Kuala Lumpur, Malaysia
- Parents: Venerable Arthur Evan David (father); Kathleen Frances Kington (mother)
- Relatives: Gwynaeth David David; Arthur Meuric Nairne David; Bronwyn David
- Occupation: Colonial administrator

Sir Edgeworth Beresford David KBE CMG (12 June 1908 – 15 May 1965) was a colonial administrator. He was appointed as a cadet in the Colonial Office in 1930 and later became the Colonial Secretary of Hong Kong from 1955 to 1957 and the last Chief Secretary of Singapore from 1958 to 1959. He was also the Administrator of Hong Kong for a short period of time after Sir Alexander Grantham left Hong Kong and Sir Robin Black was named Governor in 1957.

== Personal life ==
E.B. David was the son of Venerable Arthur Evan David and Kathleen Frances Kington.

== Honours ==
David was appointed to following honours

- Companion of St. Michael and St. George's Medal of Honor (CMG) (1954 British Queen's Birthday Awards)
- Knight Commander of the Most Excellent Order of the British Empire (KBE) (1961 New Year's Awards)

Government offices
Preceded by Sir Robin Black	Colonial Secretary of Hong Kong; 1955–1957	Succeeded by Claude Bramall Burgess
Preceded by Sir Alexander Grantham as Governor of Hong Kong	Administrator of Hong Kong; 1957–1958	Succeeded by Sir Robin Black as Governor of Hong Kong
Preceded by Sir William Goode	Chief Secretary of Singapore; 1958–1959	Position abolished
