= Richard Rutledge Kane =

British colonial administrator

Captain Richard Cecil Rutledge Kane, MC (1877 – 4 November 1958) was the United Kingdom's fourth Resident Commissioner of the Solomon Islands Protectorate, serving from 1921 to 1929. He had previously worked in Fiji as District Commissioner for Rewa, as well as serving in the colony's Legislative Council.

Kane was born in Belfast, Ireland, to Annie (née) Greenslead and the Church of Ireland Minister, Orange Order Grand Master, and early patron of the Gaelic League, Richard Rutledge Kane (1841–98). During the First World War he served with the Royal Dublin Fusiliers, and the Royal Irish Rifles. In March 1917, he was awarded the Military Cross for "conspicuous bravery" in the Gallipoli campaign.

As Resident Commissioner in Samoa, he made a speech on Malaita about the benefits of the new tax per head. The speech caused considerable resentment, as in truth, there was little to show for the tax collection. The District Commissioner of Malaita, William R. Bell, then pushed the authorities to provide a Medical Officer and other return for the tax money. The resentment did not decrease, however, and Bell was murdered by Kwaio in October 1927 as part of the Malaita massacre. Kane was on tour at the time of the killing, and his deputy Captain N.S.B. Kidson sought immediate help. By the time Kane returned, a punitive expedition was nearly fully planned.

In November Kane began planning for a resettlement of the Kwaio on another island. He was later encouraged by the High Commissioner in Fiji issuing a 'King's Regulation to Authorise the Detention of Certain Natives Formerly Living on the Island of Malaita,' declaring as lawful the detention of the 200 Kwaio that were brought to Tulagi during the expedition. However, the scheme was quashed by Lieutenant-Colonel H.C. Moorhouse, sent by the Secretary of State for the Colonies to investigate, who pushed for rapid repatriation of the detainees. They were returned in August 1928.

Government offices
Preceded by Charles Rufus Marshall Workman	Resident Commissioner of the Solomon Islands Protectorate; 1921–1929	Succeeded by Francis Noel Ashley
