= Frank William Frederick Johnson =

British entrepreneur and army officer (1866–1943)

Lieutenant colonel Sir Frank William Frederick Johnson DSO KBE

Member of the Rhodesian Legislative Assembly
- In office 8 March 1927 – 19 September 1928 Serving with Harry Bertin
- Preceded by: George Frederick Elcombe
- Succeeded by: Gordon Ross Milne
- Constituency: Salisbury South

Personal details
- Born: 21 June 1866 Watlington, Norfolk, England
- Died: 6 September 1943 (aged 77) Douglas, Isle of Man
- Party: Progressive Party; Reform Party
- Education: King's Lynn Grammar School

Military service
- Allegiance: United Kingdom
- Rank: Lieutenant colonel
- Unit: Royal Sussex Regiment
- Battles/wars: Langeberg Rebellion; World War I; North-West Frontier Theatre

Lt Col Sir Frank William Frederick Johnson DSO, KBE (21 June 1866 – 6 September 1943) was a British Army officer and Member of the Legislative Assembly for Salisbury South constituency.

== Early life and education ==
Frank William Frederick Johnson was born in June 1866 in Watlington, Norfolk. He completed his early education at King Edward VII, but decided not to study medicine and follow his father's vocation.

== Early military career ==
Johnson reached Cape Town in August 1882. Later, he served the Bechuanaland Border Police.

== Bibliography ==
- Johnson, Frank William Frederick (1940). Great Days: The Autobiography of an Empire Pioneer. G. Bell.
