= List of ambassadors and high commissioners of Zimbabwe to the United Kingdom =

Ambassador of Zimbabwe to the United Kingdom
- Incumbent; Colonel Christian Katsande since 18 June 2018
- Style: His Excellency
- Appointer: Emmerson Mnangagwa
- Inaugural holder: Sir Francis James Newton
- Formation: 1924 (Southern Rhodesia)
- Website: Embassy of Zimbabwe to the United Kingdom and Ireland

The ambassador of Zimbabwe to the United Kingdom is an officer of the Zimbabwean Ministry of Foreign Affairs and the head of the Embassy of the Republic of Zimbabwe to the United Kingdom in London. The position has the rank and status of an ambassador extraordinary and plenipotentiary and also serves as Zimbabwe's non-resident accredited Ambassador to Ireland.

The ambassador is currently Colonel Christian Katsande. Having been a High Commission since Zimbabwe's formal independence in 1980, on Zimbabwe's departure from the Commonwealth of Nations in 2003, the High Commission became an Embassy. Based in Zimbabwe House on the Strand, London, the embassy dates back to the establishment of the High Commission of Southern Rhodesia in 1924 after that colony was granted a limited form of self-government in 1923. The office later became the High Commission of the Federation of Rhodesia and Nyasaland from 1954 to 1963, the Southern Rhodesia High Commission from 1963 to 1965, and the Rhodesian Representative Office from 1965 to 1969. Between 2016 and 2018 the office was vacant, as the UK Government had rejected President Robert Mugabe's nominee, Ray Ndhlukula, for his role in the Mugabe government's land seizure program.

== Officeholders ==
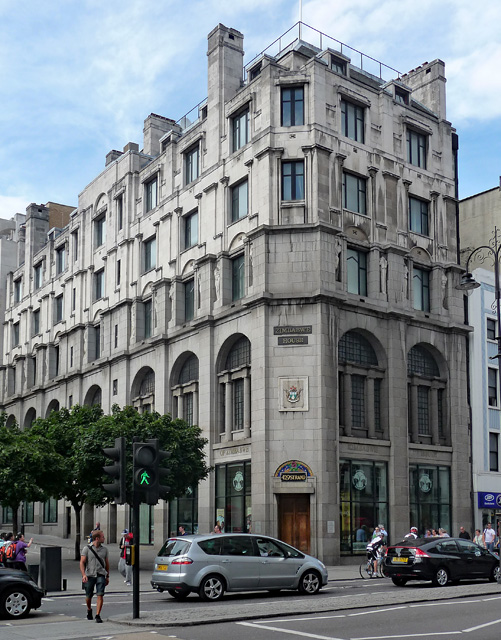
Zimbabwe House (former Rhodesia House) at 429 The Strand.

=== High commissioners from Southern Rhodesia, 1924–53 ===
Incumbent	Start of term	End of term	Notes
Sir Francis James Newton	1924	1930	
John Wallace Downie	1930	1935	
Stephen Martin Lanigan O'Keeffe	1935	1946	
Kenneth MacKenzie Goodenough	1946	1953	

=== High commissioners from the Federation of Rhodesia and Nyasaland, 1954–63 ===
Incumbent	Start of term	End of term	Notes
Sir Gilbert Rennie	May 1954	1961	
Sir Albert Robinson	1961	1963	

=== High commissioners from Southern Rhodesia, 1963–1965 ===
Incumbent	Start of term	End of term	Notes
Evan Campbell	1963	1965	
Andrew Skeen	22 July 1965	12 November 1965	

=== Representative from Rhodesia, 1965–1969 ===
Incumbent	Start of term	End of term	Notes
Sydney Frederick Brice	12 November 1965	15 July 1969	

=== High commissioners from Zimbabwe, 1980–2003 ===
Incumbent	Start of term	End of term	Notes
Robert Tatira Zwinoira	1980	1984	
Herbert Murerwa	1 March 1984	1990	
Stephen Chiketa	1991	1993	
Dr Ngoni Togarepi Chideya	1993	1999	
Simbarashe Mumbengegwi	1999	7 December 2003	

=== Ambassadors from Zimbabwe, 2003–date ===
Incumbent	Start of term	End of term	Notes
Simbarashe Mumbengegwi	7 December 2003	2005	
Gabriel Machinga	2005	2016	
Vacant	2016	2018	
Christian Katsande	18 June 2018	date	

== See also ==
- United Kingdom–Zimbabwe relations
- List of ambassadors of the United Kingdom to Zimbabwe
