= List of resident commissioners and governors of the Solomon Islands =

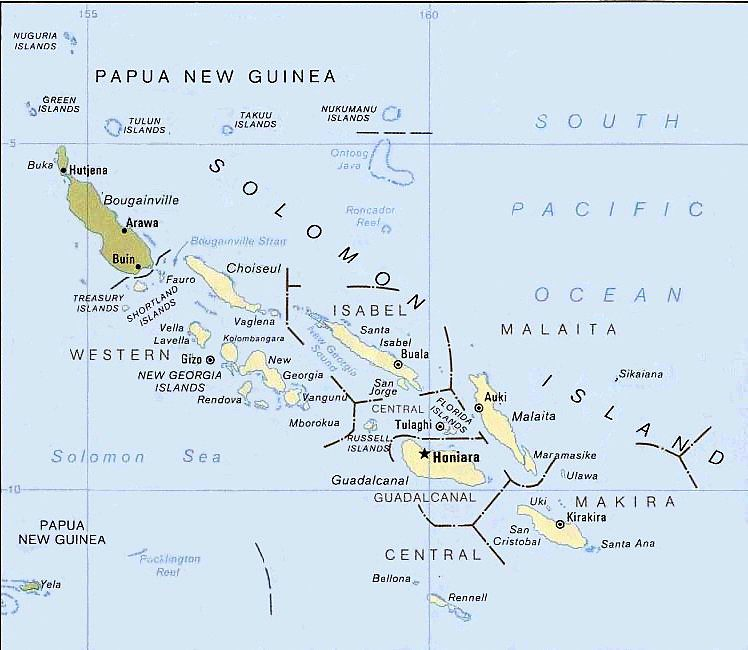
The Solomon Islands archipelago (excluding the Santa Cruz Islands), with the British Solomon Islands in beige and Bougainville Island (in the North Solomon Islands) in dun

This is a list of the resident commissioners of the British Solomon Islands protectorate (1893–1975) and the dependent Solomon Islands (1975–1978). Following independence in 1978 the office of Governor of the Solomon Islands ceased, the country name changed to just Solomon Islands, and the holder of the office of Governor-General of Solomon Islands became the head of state as the monarch's representative.

== Resident commissioners of the Solomon Islands Protectorate (1896–1953) ==
The resident commissioners were subordinate to the High Commissioner for the Western Pacific, a position held by the Governor of Fiji until 3 July 1952.

Term	Name
1896–1915	Charles Morris Woodford
1915–1917	Frederick Joshua Barnett
1917–1921	Charles Rufus Marshall Workman
1921–1929	Richard Rutledge Kane
1929–1939	Francis Noel Ashley
1939–1943	William Sydney Marchant
1943–1950	Owen Cyril Noel
1950 – 1 January 1953	Henry Graham Gregory-Smith

== Governors of the Solomon Islands (1953–1978) ==
From 3 July 1952, Fiji and Tonga were removed from the jurisdiction of the Western Pacific High Commission. The High Commissioner remained temporarily based in Fiji, but moved to Honiara, British Solomon Islands, at the end of 1952, and from 1 January 1953, the role was combined with that of the Governor of the Solomon Islands. On 1 January 1972, the Gilbert and Ellice Islands separated with their own governor. On 2 January 1976, after nearly all had been given separate statehood, the High Commission was abolished.

Term	Name
3 July 1952 – July 1955	Sir Robert Stanley
July 1955 – 4 March 1961	Sir John Gutch
4 March 1961 – 16 June 1964	Sir David Trench
16 June 1964 – 1968	Sir Robert Sidney Foster
6 March 1969 – 1973	Sir Michael Gass
1973–1976	Sir Donald Luddington
1976 – 7 July 1978	Sir Colin Allan

== See also ==
- Governor-General of Solomon Islands
- Prime Minister of Solomon Islands
