= Edmund Brinsley Teesdale =

Edmund Brinsley Teesdale CMG MC (Chinese: 戴斯德, 30 September 1915 – 5 March 1997) was the Colonial Secretary of Hong Kong from 1963 to 1965. He announced his retirement in March 1965 and was succeeded by Michael David Irving Gass.

In December 1965, Teesdale became director of the Association of the British Pharmaceutical Industry.

Government offices
Preceded by Claude Bramall Burgess	Colonial Secretary; 1963–1965	Succeeded by Michael David Irving Gass
Preceded by Sir Robert Brown Black	Administrator of Hong Kong; 1964	Succeeded by Sir David Clive Crosbie Trench
