= Owen Cyril Noel =

Colonel Owen Cyril Noel (1898 – May 1970) was a British colonial administrator. He served as Resident Commissioner of the Solomon Islands Protectorate from 1943 to 1950. Prior to that, he had been a district commissioner in Uganda.
