= Jack Cater =

British colonial administrator

Sir Jack Cater KBE, JP

Chief Secretary of Hong Kong
- In office 3 October 1978 – 19 November 1981
- Monarch: Elizabeth II
- Governor: Murray MacLehose
- Preceded by: Denys Roberts
- Succeeded by: Philip Haddon-Cave

1st Commissioner of the Independent Commission Against Corruption
- In office 15 February 1974 – 3 July 1978
- Monarch: Elizabeth II
- Governor: Murray MacLehose
- Succeeded by: Donald Luddington

Personal details
- Born: 21 February 1922 London, United Kingdom
- Died: 14 April 2006 (aged 84) Guernsey
- Spouse: Peggy
- Children: 3

Military service
- Allegiance: United Kingdom
- Branch/service: Royal Air Force
- Rank: Squadron Leader

Jack Cater
- Traditional Chinese: 姬達
Transcriptions
Yue: Cantonese
- Jyutping: gei1 daat6

Sir Jack Cater KBE JP (Chinese: 姬達; 21 February 1922 – 14 April 2006) was the chief secretary of Hong Kong from 1978 to 1981. Cater was the third chief secretary under the Governorship of Sir Murray MacLehose, later Lord MacLehose of Beoch. He was the founding commissioner of the Independent Commission Against Corruption of Hong Kong.

== Biography ==
=== Career ===
Cater served in Royal Air Force fighter squadrons during the World War II. Cater arrived in Hong Kong to work with the British military jurisdiction after the Japanese surrender. Cater began his career of civil service in 1946 as a cadet officer in the Fisheries Department, and was made Director of Agriculture and Fisheries in 1964. In 1966 Cater attended the Imperial Defence College in London. He was appointed by then Governor David Trench to lead the team that restored peace and security following the riots in 1967. He became Defence Secretary and Special Assistant to Governor David Trench during the civil unrest in 1967, and subsequently served as Deputy Colonial Secretary (1967–68), executive director of the newly established Trade Development Council (1968–70), Director of Commerce and Industry (1970–72), Secretary for Information (1972-73) and the Secretary for Home Affairs in 1973.

Cater was instrumental in establishing schools in all of Hong Kong's fishing villages.

In February 1974, he was delighted to accept appointment to the first Commissionership of the Independent Commission Against Corruption (ICAC) by Murray MacLehose following the flight of Police Superintendent Peter Godber, who was under investigation at the time regarding several million pounds stashed in Vancouver banks. His widow later revealed that Cater considered at one point leaving the government. She said:

People did not want to believe there was such rampant corruption in Hong Kong. He had tried very hard to persuade people that we had to do something about it, but nobody was prepared to listen.

Cater was respected in Hong Kong for his role in developing the ICAC into a body capable of resisting opposition from vested interests and its critics within and outside the government. His early leadership was instrumental in the commission's growth into an institution that addressed corruption in the public and private sectors in Hong Kong.

He was knighted in 1979.

From 1981 to 1984, Cater became Hong Kong's Commissioner in London. Afterwards, he joined China Light & Power Co., and became the head of Hong Kong Nuclear Investment Co, a nuclear power station venture at Daya Bay in Guangdong province. He was also a consultant to Bechtel, a US engineering contractor, and Philips.

In 1995, he was awarded an Honorary Degree (Doctor of Laws) by the University of Bath.

=== Personal ===
Sir Jack was born on 21 February 1922, son of a London policeman. He studied in Sir George Monoux Grammar School, Walthamstow.

Sir Jack was married to Peggy in 1950. The couple lived most of their life together in Hong Kong, until the late 1990s. They had three children, Susan, Jacqueline, and Richard.

Sir Jack and Lady Cater returned to Britain, and settled on Guernsey in the Channel Islands in 2001. Cater suffered from Alzheimer's disease during the final few years of his life. He died in Guernsey on 14 April 2006, aged 84.

A memorial was held for him in Hong Kong at the St. John's Cathedral on 21 October 2006, attended by many senior officials and prominent figures, inter alia Hong Kong Chief Executive Donald Tsang, Run Run Shaw, David Akers-Jones, former Secretary for Security Alistair Asprey, as well as Raymond Wong and Lily Yam, respectively the then current Commissioner and a former Commissioner of the ICAC.

== In popular culture ==
In the 2021 Hong Kong film Once Upon a Time in Hong Kong, Sir Jack Cater was portrayed by Michael Joseph Rosenthal.

== See also ==
- History of Hong Kong

Government offices
Preceded by Sir Donald Luddington	Secretary for Home Affairs; 1973	Succeeded by Dennis Bray
Preceded by Sir Denys Roberts	Chief Secretary of Hong Kong; 1978–1981	Succeeded by Sir Charles Philip Haddon-Cave
Preceded by Terence Dare Sorby	Director of Commerce & Industry and Commissioner of Preventive Service; 1970–1972	Succeeded by David Harold Jordan
New division	Commissioner, Independent Commission Against Corruption; 1974–1978	Succeeded by Sir Donald Luddington
