= Claude Bramall Burgess =

Claude Bramall Burgess CMG OBE (Chinese: 白嘉時, 25 February 1910 – 2 November 1998) was the Colonial Secretary of Hong Kong from 1958 to 1963.

On 9 October 1935, he was appointed Second Assistant Superintendent of Imports and Exports. From 1939 to 1941, he was the Deputy Clerk of the Legislative Council of Hong Kong and he became the Acting Clerk of the Legislative Council at 1946.

== Personal life ==
In 1952, Burgess married his wife Margaret. They divorced in 1965.

Government offices
Preceded by Edgeworth Beresford David	Colonial Secretary of Hong Kong; 1958–1963	Succeeded by Edmund Brinsley Teesdale
