= David Trench =

British colonial administrator (1915–1988)

Sir David Trench GCMG MC DL

24th Governor of Hong Kong
- In office 14 April 1964 – 19 October 1971
- Monarch: Elizabeth II
- Colonial Secretary: Edmund Brinsley Teesdale; Michael Gass; Hugh Norman-Walker
- Preceded by: Robert Brown Black
- Succeeded by: Murray MacLehose

3rd Governor of the Solomon Islands
- In office 4 March 1961 – 16 June 1964
- Monarch: Elizabeth II
- Preceded by: John Gutch
- Succeeded by: Robert Sidney Foster

19th High Commissioner for the Western Pacific
- In office 4 March 1961 – 16 June 1964
- Monarch: Elizabeth II
- Preceded by: John Gutch
- Succeeded by: Robert Sidney Foster

Personal details
- Born: David Clive Crosbie Trench; 2 June 1915 Quetta, British Raj
- Died: 4 December 1988 (aged 73) Shillingstone, Dorset, England
- Spouse(s): Margaret Gould, Lady Trench
- Children: 1
- Education: Jesus College, Cambridge
- Profession: Soldier, colonial administrator

Chinese name
- Chinese: 戴麟趾
Transcriptions
Standard Mandarin
- Hanyu Pinyin: Dài Línzhǐ
Yue: Cantonese
- Jyutping: daai3 leon4 zi2

Sir David Clive Crosbie Trench GCMG MC DL (Chinese: 戴麟趾; 2 June 1915 – 4 December 1988) was a British Army officer and colonial governor who served as the Governor of Hong Kong from April 15, 1964 to October 19, 1971 and was High Commissioner for the Western Pacific.

== Early life ==
Trench was educated at Tonbridge School, Tonbridge, Kent and graduated from Jesus College, Cambridge with the degree of Master of Arts (M.A.).

== War service ==
In 1938, Trench entered the Colonial Service as a cadet in the British Solomon Islands Protectorate and was seconded to the Western Pacific High Commission in 1941. He was also commissioned into the Royal Artillery (Supplementary Reserve). From 1939 to 1945, he fought in the Second World War and served in the British Solomon Islands Protectorate Defence Force from 1942 to 1946. For this, Trench was awarded the decoration of the Military Cross and the US Legion of Merit in 1944. That year he was posted to the island of Malaita, with the task of repressing the Maasina Rule, an uprising aimed at securing independence for Malaita. In August 1947, he was appointed Secretary for Development and Native Affairs, and his crackdown on the Maasina Rule continued.

Trench attained the rank of Lieutenant-Colonel in 1947 and studied at the Joint Services Command and Staff College in Swindon, Wiltshire in 1949.

== Colonial administration career ==
Trench served as Governor of the Solomon Islands and High Commissioner for the Western Pacific from 1961 to 1964. In 1950, Trench became Assistant Secretary to the Deputy Defence Secretary for Hong Kong. He eventually held the office of Deputy Financial Secretary in 1956 and Commissioner of Labour and Mines in 1957. In 1958, Trench studied at the Imperial Defence College in London.

Trench served as Deputy Colonial Secretary of Hong Kong between 1959 and 1960. He left Hong Kong to take up the office of High Commissioner for the Western Pacific between 1961 and 1964, but returned to Hong Kong as Governor and Commander-in-Chief of Hong Kong between 1964 and 1971.

His governorship in Hong Kong inherited from his predecessor an increasingly prosperous city, along with numerous social issues that came with it: water shortages, refugees from mainland China, and an alarming rise in corruption. After major riots in 1966 and 1967, his administration belatedly introduced some social reforms, including the establishment of City District Offices in 1968 as links between the government and the public; the legislation of an eight-hour work day, six-day work week in 1971; and the introduction of a six-year compulsory primary school education, also in 1971.

== Personal life ==
Trench married Margaret Gould on 18 August 1944. The couple had one daughter, Katherine Elizabeth (1956–2017). Trench was also a distant kinsman of the Barons Ashtown, and one of his distant relatives, Nigel Clive Cosby Trench, also worked in the Foreign Service and succeeded to the Barony of Ashtown in 1990.

Trench died on 4 December 1988, aged 73.

== Offices and honours ==
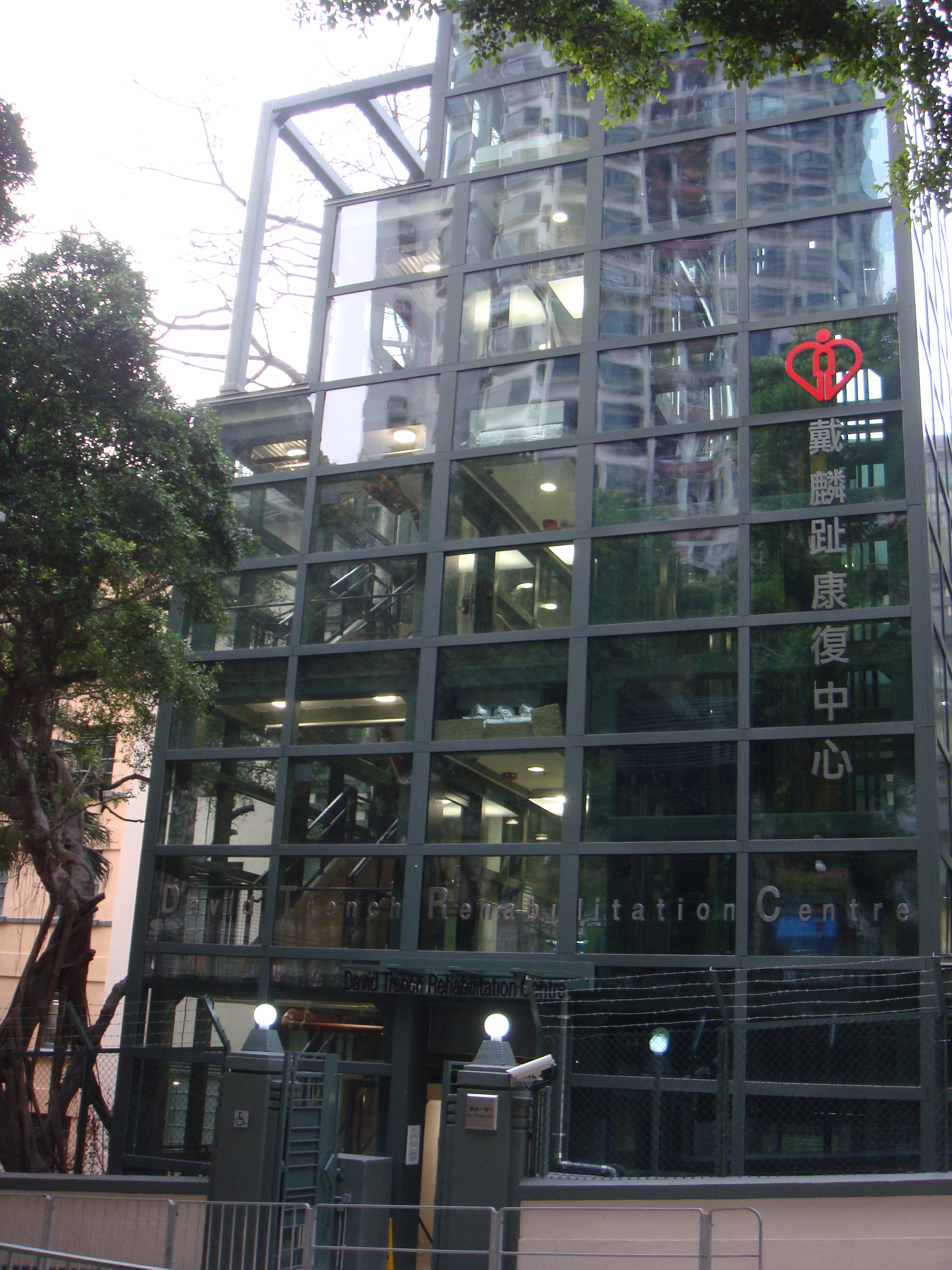
David Trench Rehabilitation Centre

- C.M.G., 1960
- K.C.M.G., 1962
- K.St.J., 1964
- Honorary LL.D. degree from the University of Hong Kong, 1968
- G.C.M.G., 1969
- Governor of Hong Kong, 1964 to 1971
- President of St. John Ambulance Brigade and Association in Dorset since 1972.
- Chairman, Dorset Area Health Authority from 1973 to 1982
- Deputy Lieutenant of Dorset, 1977
- The Trench Methadone Clinic and the David Trench Rehabilitation Clinic, both in Hong Kong, are named after him
- Ching Cheung Road in Kwai Chung, New Territories, Hong Kong is named in honour of him

== See also ==
- John James Cowperthwaite
- History of Hong Kong

Government offices
Preceded by John Gutch	High Commissioner for the Western Pacific; 1961–1964	Succeeded by Robert Sidney Foster
Preceded by John Gutch	Governor of the Solomon Islands; 1961–1964	Succeeded by Robert Sidney Foster
Preceded by Robert Brown Black	Governor of Hong Kong; 1964–1971	Succeeded by Murray MacLehose
