= Governor Stanley =

Governor Stanley may refer to:

- Augustus Owsley Stanley (1867–1958), 38th Governor of Kentucky
- Herbert Stanley (1872–1955), Governor of Northern Rhodesia from 1924 to 1927, of Ceylon from 1928 to 1931, and of Southern Rhodesia from 1935 to 1942
- Robert Christopher Stafford Stanley (1899–1983), Governor of the Solomon Islands from 1953 to 1955
- Thomas B. Stanley (1890–1970), 57th Governor of Virginia
- William Eugene Stanley (1844–1910), 15th Governor of Kansas
