= Governor Waddington =

Governor Waddington may refer to:

- John Waddington (governor) (1890–1957), Governor of Barbados from 1938 to 1941, and Governor of Northern Rhodesia from to 1941 to 1947
- David Waddington, Baron Waddington (1929–2017), Governor of Bermuda from 1992 to 1997
