= High Commissioner for the Western Pacific =

British imperial CEO

- High Commissioner for the Western Pacific
- Style: His Excellency The Right Honourable
- Residence: Suva, Fiji (1877–1952); Honiara, British Solomon Islands (1953–1976)
- Appointer: King/Queen of the United Kingdom
- Formation: 13 August 1877
- First holder: Sir Arthur Hamilton-Gordon
- Final holder: Sir Donald Luddington
- Abolished: 2 January 1976

The high commissioner for the Western Pacific was a colonial office of the British Empire in the western Pacific Ocean. The High Commissioner was the head of the Western Pacific High Commission, which was based in Fiji from 1877 to 1952 and in the British Solomon Islands Protectorate from 1952 to 1976.

The High Commission filled various roles during its existence. It was created by an order-in-council in 1877 and initially exercised extraterritorial jurisdiction over British subjects within a defined portion of the western Pacific Ocean, largely for the purpose of controlling the illegal blackbirding trade in Pacific Islander labourers. A High Commissioner's Court was also established, presided over by the Chief Judicial Commissioner for the Western Pacific.

In 1893, the role of the High Commission expanded to include a supervisory role over the British protectorates proclaimed over individual islands, including the Ellice Islands (Tuvalu), Gilbert Islands and southern Solomon Islands. Authority in protectorates was typically delegated to deputy commissioners or resident commissioners, who exercised varying administrative powers or filled quasi-diplomatic roles (in the case of the Kingdom of Tonga and the New Hebrides condominium).

The role of High Commissioner was filled ex officio by the Governor of Fiji until 1952, when the High Commissioner was moved to Honiara in the Solomon Islands. After that point, the High Commission directly administered the British Solomon Islands Protectorate until it was granted self-government in 1976, with resident commissioners also exercising powers in the New Hebrides and the Gilbert and Ellice Islands Colony until 1972.

== History ==
The Pacific Islanders Protection Act 1875 (38 & 39 Vict. c. 51), then later, the Foreign Jurisdiction Act 1890 (53 & 54 Vict. c. 37), provided for jurisdiction over British subjects in the Pacific. In 1877 the position of High Commissioner for the Western Pacific was formalised by the Western Pacific Order in Council 1877 by the Privy Council of the United Kingdom. Article 12 established the Chief Justice of Fiji as the Chief Judicial Commissioner for the Western Pacific. The Order in Council granted the High Commissioner authority to manage the engagement of indentured labourers and to otherwise give the colonial entity authority over British subjects in the Western Pacific beyond the jurisdiction of British and colonial Australian laws.

The Governor of Fiji was given authority over persons and acts in the islands south of the equator. The Governor, as High Commissioner and Consul-General, was given the authority: to conduct diplomatic relations with local representatives of the foreign powers, to regulate the labour trade where it was conducted by British subjects only, and to maintain law and order among British subjects in the Pacific islands where there were no recognised governments. The regulation of the coercive labour trade in Melanesia, which was known as Blackbirding, was significant problem for the Western Pacific High Commission. Ships of the Royal Navy Australian Station were responsible for limiting blackbirding. The High Commissioner appointed resident commissioners to manage specific island territories. Following a commission of inquiry, a revised Order in Council was issued in 1893, which gave the resident commissioners wider autonomy over the islands under their control.

In 2002 the archived records of the High Commission were transferred to New Zealand, and are now held in the Special Collections of the University of Auckland Library.

== List of high commissioners for the Western Pacific (1877–1976) ==
#	Incumbent	Portrait	Tenure		Monarch	Concurrent office
#	Incumbent	Portrait	Took office	Left office	Monarch	Concurrent office
High Commissioner for the Western Pacific
1.	Sir Arthur Hamilton-Gordon		13 August 1877	1880	Victoria	Governor of Fiji
2.	Sir William Des Vœux		20 December 1880	21 January 1885	Victoria	Governor of Fiji
	John Bates Thurston; Acting		21 January 1885	1 January 1887	Victoria	Governor of Fiji (acting)
3.	Sir Charles Mitchell		1 January 1887	February 1888	Victoria	Governor of Fiji
4.	Sir John Bates Thurston		February 1888	7 February 1897	Victoria	Governor of Fiji
5.	Sir George T. M. O'Brien		March 1897	1901	Victoria	Governor of Fiji
	Sir William Allardyce; Acting		1901	10 September 1902	Edward VII	Governor of Fiji (acting)
6.	Sir Henry Jackson		10 September 1902	11 October 1904	Edward VII	Governor of Fiji
7.	Sir Everard im Thurn		11 October 1904	1910	Edward VII	Governor of Fiji
	Sir Charles Major; Acting		1910	21 February 1911	Edward VII; George V	Governor of Fiji (acting)
8.	Sir Francis May		21 February 1911	25 July 1912	George V	Governor of Fiji
9.	Sir Ernest Sweet-Escott		25 July 1912	10 October 1918	George V	Governor of Fiji
	Sir Eyre Hutson; Acting for Sweet-Escott		1915	1916	George V	Governor of Fiji (acting)
10.	Cecil Hunter-Rodwell		10 October 1918	25 April 1925	George V	Governor of Fiji
	Sir Eyre Hutson; Acting for Hunter-Rodwell		1919	1919	George V	Governor of Fiji (acting)
11.	Sir Eyre Hutson		25 April 1925	22 November 1929	George V	Governor of Fiji
12.	Sir Arthur Fletcher		22 November 1929	May 1936	George V Edward VIII	Governor of Fiji
	Sir Cecil Barton; Acting		May 1936	November 1936	Edward VIII	Governor of Fiji (acting)
13.	Sir Arthur Richards		28 November 1936	August 1938	Edward VIII; George VI	Governor of Fiji
	Sir Cecil Barton; Acting		August 1938	September 1938	George VI	Governor of Fiji (acting)
14.	Sir Harry Luke		16 September 1938	1942	George VI	Governor of Fiji
	Office suspended		1942	1945		
15.	Sir Alexander Grantham		1945	21 March 1947	George VI	Governor of Fiji
	Sir John Nicoll; Acting		21 March 1947	8 October 1947	George VI	Governor of Fiji (acting)
16.	Sir Brian Freeston		8 October 1947	3 July 1952	George VI; Elizabeth II	Governor of Fiji
17.	Sir Robert Stanley		3 July 1952	July 1955	Elizabeth II	Governor of the Solomon Islands (From 1 January 1953)
18.	Sir John Gutch		1955	4 March 1961	Elizabeth II	Governor of the Solomon Islands
19.	Sir David Trench		4 March 1961	16 June 1964	Elizabeth II	Governor of the Solomon Islands
20.	Sir Robert Sidney Foster		16 June 1964	6 March 1969	Elizabeth II	Governor of the Solomon Islands
21.	Sir Michael Gass		6 March 1969	1973	Elizabeth II	Governor of the Solomon Islands
22.	Sir Donald Luddington		10 October 1973	2 January 1976	Elizabeth II	Governor of the Solomon Islands

== Sources and external links ==
- Scarr, Deryck (1967). Fragments of Empire: A History of the Western Pacific High Commission, 1877-1914. ANU Press. ISBN 9780708106846.
- Scarr, Deryck (2000). "Western Pacific High Commission". In Lal, Brij V.; Fortune, Kate (eds.). The Pacific Islands: An Encyclopedia. University of Hawaii Press. pp. 240–241. ISBN 9780824822651.
- McIntyre, William David. "Disraeli's colonial policy: The creation of the Western Pacific High Commission, 1874–1877." Historical Studies: Australia and New Zealand Volume 9, Issue 35 (1960): 279–294.
- Moore, Clive (2019). Tulagi: Pacific Outpost of British Empire (PDF). ANU Press. ISBN 9781760463090.
