= Alexander Grantham =

British colonial administrator and diplomat (1899–1978)

Sir Alexander Grantham GCMG

22nd Governor of Hong Kong
- In office 25 July 1947 – 31 December 1957
- Monarchs: George VI; Elizabeth II
- Colonial Secretary: David Mercer MacDougall; John Fearns Nicoll; Sir Robin Black; Edgeworth Beresford David
- Preceded by: Sir Mark Aitchison Young
- Succeeded by: Sir Robin Black

17th Governor of Fiji
- In office 1 January 1945 – 1947
- Monarch: George VI
- Preceded by: Sir Philip Mitchell
- Succeeded by: Sir Brian Freeston

15th High Commissioner for the Western Pacific
- In office 1 January 1945 – 1947
- Monarch: George VI
- Preceded by: (vacant)
- Succeeded by: Sir Brian Freeston

Personal details
- Born: Alexander William George Herder Grantham; 15 March 1899 London, England
- Died: 4 October 1978 (aged 79) London, England
- Spouses: Maurine Samson, Lady Grantham (m. 1925; died 1970) M. E. Lumley, Lady Grantham (m. 1972)
- Relations: Warren de la Rue; Thomas de la Rue; Sir William Grantham
- Education: Royal Military College, Sandhurst; Pembroke College, Cambridge; Imperial Defence College
- Occupation: Soldier, Colonial administrator

Chinese name
- Chinese: 葛量洪
Transcriptions
Standard Mandarin
- Hanyu Pinyin: Gě Liànghóng
Yue: Cantonese
- Jyutping: got3 loeng4 hung4

Sir Alexander William George Herder Grantham, GCMG (Chinese: 葛量洪; 15 March 1899 – 4 October 1978) was a British colonial administrator who governed Hong Kong and Fiji.

== Early life, colonial administration career ==
Grantham was born on 15 March 1899 and was educated at Wellington and the Royal Military College, Sandhurst

He was granted a regular army commission and gazetted a second lieutenant in the 18th Hussars as of 12 September 1917 but was attached to the 5th Reserve Regiment of Cavalry stationed at Tidworth, where it trained men for nine different cavalry regiments, including the 18th Hussars. He was promoted a Lieutenant in the 18th Hussars 13 March 1919 but resigned his commission on 30 May 1919.

After resigning his commission and leaving the army he went up to Pembroke College, Cambridge later in 1919 and after graduating in 1922 he joined the Colonial Office as an Eastern Cadet in Hong Kong. He was the Deputy Clerk of the Legislative Council of Hong Kong for a short period in 1933. In 1934, he was called to the Bar at the Inner Temple and attended the Imperial Defence College later that year.

Grantham became Colonial Secretary of Bermuda from 1935 to 1938, and of Jamaica from 1938 to 1941. He then served as Chief Secretary of Nigeria from 1941 to 1944 and as Governor of Fiji and High Commissioner for the Western Pacific from 1945 to 1947.

Immediately after his tenure as High Commissioner ended, he became Governor of Hong Kong, until 1957. He opposed his predecessor, Sir Mark Young's proposal of expanding social services on the grounds that the local Chinese population cared little about social welfare. Instead, he proposed the election of Unofficial members of the Legislative Council among British subjects only with the Governor holding reserved power to override LegCo decisions.

== Legacy of governorship ==
His tenure marked the beginning of a unitary housing policy by the Hong Kong Government. In December 1953, a fire burned down a large slum area in Shek Kip Mei, Kowloon, killing nine and leaving many homeless. It was under Grantham's administration that the government began to build settlement houses for the homeless. From that point on, the government was deeply involved in low-cost public housing programmes that allowed many Hong Kong people who could not afford to own a flat to live in government-owned housing estates at relatively low cost. The housing programme eventually evolved over time to allow people to buy low-cost housing and receive favourable loans to buy their own houses.

== Honours ==
- Honorary Fellow, Pembroke College, Cambridge
- Honorary Doctorate of Laws degree, Hong Kong University
- CMG, 1941
- KCMG, 1945
- GCMG, 1951

== Personal life ==
Grantham grew up partly in Tianjin, where his father practised law. Both his father and brother were killed in World War I. His mother then remarried, to Johan Wilhelm Normann Munthe, and the family moved to Beijing.

Grantham was married twice. His first marriage, in 1925, was to the well-travelled Maurine Samson, daughter of the late Amos Roland Samson and Liberty "Libby" Cole (Neal) of Champaign County, Illinois. The Governor's official yacht, a Hong Kong health clinic, and a locomotive, were named "Lady Maurine" after her. His first wife died in 1970, and Grantham married (Mrs) M.E. Lumley in 1972. He died on 4 October 1978.

== Honours ==
- United Kingdom :
  - Companion of the Order of St Michael and St George (C.M.G.) (1941)
  - Knight Commander of the Order of St Michael and St George (K.C.M.G.) - Sir (1945)
  - Knight Grand Cross of the Order of St Michael and St George (G.C.M.G.) - Sir (1951)

== Places/facilities named after him ==
- Grantham Hospital in Aberdeen, Hong Kong
- Grantham College of Education in Hong Kong
- Alexander Grantham, a fireboat of the Fire Services Department of the Government of Hong Kong
- Sir Alexander, an EMD G12 Diesel-electric locomotive No. 51, introduced in Hong Kong in 1955 and on display at the Hong Kong Railway Museum

== Bibliography ==
- Alexander Grantham (1965). Via ports, from Hong Kong to Hong Kong. Hong Kong University Press.

== See also ==
- History of Hong Kong

Government offices
Preceded by Sir Philip Euen Mitchell	Governor of Fiji; 1946–1947	Succeeded by Sir Brian Freeston
Vacant Title last held by Sir Harry Luke	High Commissioner for the Western Pacific; 1946–1947	Succeeded by Sir Brian Freeston
Preceded by Sir Mark Aitchison Young	Governor of Hong Kong; 1947–1957	Succeeded by Sir Robin Black
