= Juxon Barton =

British colonial administrator

Sir Juxon Barton

Acting High Commissioner for the Western Pacific
- In office May 1936 – November 1936
- Monarch: Edward VIII
- Preceded by: Sir Arthur Fletcher
- Succeeded by: Sir Arthur Richards

Acting Governor of Fiji
- In office May 1936 – November 1936
- Monarch: Edward VIII
- Preceded by: Sir Arthur Fletcher
- Succeeded by: Sir Arthur Richards

Acting High Commissioner for the Western Pacific
- In office August 1938 – September 1938
- Monarch: George VI
- Preceded by: Sir Arthur Richards
- Succeeded by: Sir Harry Luke

Acting Governor of Fiji
- In office August 1938 – September 1938
- Monarch: George VI
- Preceded by: Sir Arthur Richards
- Succeeded by: Sir Harry Luke

Personal details
- Born: Cecil James Juxon Talbot Barton; 13 April 1891 Ross-on-Wye, Herefordshire
- Died: 29 September 1980 (aged 89) Hastings, Sussex, England

Sir Cecil James Juxon Talbot Barton CMG OBE (13 April 1891 – 29 September 1980) known as Sir Juxon Barton, was a British colonial administrator who twice served as Governor of Fiji and High Commissioner for the Western Pacific. His first term in both roles ran from May to November 1936, and his second from August to September 1938.

Born in Ross-on-Wye, he was the eldest child of Robert Cecil Eustace Barton and Amy Isabella Barton.

Perhaps his best-known quote is: "Be daring, be different, be impractical, be anything that will assert integrity of purpose and imaginative vision against the play-it-safers, the creatures of the commonplace, the slaves of the ordinary."

Government offices
Preceded by Sir Arthur Fletcher	Acting; High Commissioner for the Western Pacific; 1936	Succeeded by Sir Arthur Richards
Preceded by Sir Arthur Fletcher	Acting; Governor of Fiji; 1936	Succeeded by Sir Arthur Richards
Preceded by Sir Arthur Richards	Acting; High Commissioner for the Western Pacific; 1938	Succeeded by Sir Harry Luke
Preceded by Sir Arthur Richards	Acting; Governor of Fiji; 1938	Succeeded by Sir Harry Luke
