= Eyre Hutson (colonial administrator) =

English colonial administrator (1864–1936)

Sir Eyre Hutson KCMG

Acting High Commissioner for the Western Pacific
- In office 1915–1916
- Monarch: George V
- Preceded by: Cecil Hunter-Rodwell
- Succeeded by: Cecil Hunter-Rodwell

Acting Governor of Fiji
- In office 1915–1916
- Monarch: George V
- Preceded by: Sir Ernest Sweet-Escott
- Succeeded by: Sir Ernest Sweet-Escott

8th Governor of British Honduras
- In office 1918–1925
- Monarch: George V
- Preceded by: William Hart-Bennett
- Succeeded by: John Burdon

Acting High Commissioner for the Western Pacific
- In office 1919–1919
- Monarch: George V
- Preceded by: Cecil Hunter-Rodwell
- Succeeded by: Cecil Hunter-Rodwell

Acting Governor of Fiji
- In office 1919–1919
- Monarch: George V
- Preceded by: Cecil Hunter-Rodwell
- Succeeded by: Cecil Hunter-Rodwell

13th High Commissioner for the Western Pacific
- In office 1925–1929
- Monarch: George V
- Preceded by: Cecil Hunter-Rodwell
- Succeeded by: Arthur George Murchison Fletcher

12th Governor of Fiji
- In office 1925–1929
- Monarch: George V
- Preceded by: Cecil Hunter-Rodwell
- Succeeded by: Arthur George Murchison Fletcher

Personal details
- Born: 25 August 1864
- Died: 14 September 1936 (aged 72) East Grinstead, Sussex, England
- Occupation: Colonial administrator

Sir Eyre Hutson KCMG (25 August 1864 – 14 September 1936) was an English colonial administrator who became Governor of British Honduras and later Governor of Fiji.

== Biography ==
Hutson was born on 25 August 1864 and in 1885 entered the colonial service. After serving in Barbados, Mauritius, British Guiana and Jamaica he was appointed colonial secretary in Bermuda in July 1901. In 1908 he transferred to Fiji as colonial secretary and between 1915 and 1916 and again in 1919 he was Acting Governor of Fiji and Acting High Commissioner for the Western Pacific.

In 1918 he became the Governor of British Honduras until 1924 when he moved back to Fiji as governor. He retired from the colonial service in 1929. He died aged 72 at East Grinstead, Sussex on 14 September 1936 after a short illness.

Government offices
Preceded by William Hart-Bennett	Governor of British Honduras; 1918–1924	Succeeded by Sir John Burdon
Preceded by Sir Cecil Hunter-Rodwell	High Commissioner for the Western Pacific; 1925–1929	Succeeded by Sir Arthur George Murchison Fletcher
Preceded by Sir Cecil Hunter-Rodwell	Governor of Fiji; 1925–1929	Succeeded by Sir Arthur George Murchison Fletcher
