= Francis Henry May =

British colonial administrator (1860–1922)

Sir Francis Henry May GCMG KStJ

15th Governor of Hong Kong
- In office 24 July 1912 – 12 September 1918
- Monarch: George V
- Colonial Sec.: Sir Claud Severn
- Preceded by: Sir Frederick Lugard
- Succeeded by: Sir Edward Stubbs

11th Colonial Secretary of Hong Kong
- In office 1902–1911
- Monarchs: Edward VII; George V
- Preceded by: Sir James Stewart Lockhart
- Succeeded by: Warren Delabere Barnes

Acting Administrator of Hong Kong
- In office 21 November 1903 – 29 July 1904
- Monarch: Edward VII
- Preceded by: Sir Henry Blake
- Succeeded by: Sir Matthew Nathan
- In office 20 April 1907 – 29 July 1907
- Monarch: Edward VII
- Preceded by: Sir Matthew Nathan
- Succeeded by: Sir Frederick Lugard

8th High Commissioner for the Western Pacific
- In office 21 February 1911 – 25 July 1912
- Monarch: George V
- Preceded by: Sir Everard im Thurn
- Succeeded by: Sir Bickham Sweet-Escott

9th Governor of Fiji
- In office 21 February 1911 – 25 July 1912
- Monarch: George V
- Preceded by: Sir Everard im Thurn
- Succeeded by: Sir Bickham Sweet-Escott

Personal details
- Born: 14 March 1860 Dublin, Ireland
- Died: 6 February 1922 (aged 61) Suffolk, England
- Resting place: Clare, Suffolk
- Spouse(s): Helena Barker, Lady May
- Children: 4
- Education: Trinity College, Dublin
- Occupation: Colonial administrator

Chinese name
- Chinese: 梅含理
Transcriptions
Yue: Cantonese
- Jyutping: mui4 ham4 lei5

Sir Francis Henry May GCMG KStJ (Chinese: 梅含理; 14 March 1860 – 6 February 1922) was a British colonial administrator who served as Governor of Fiji from 1911 to 1912 and Governor of Hong Kong from 1912 to 1918.

== Early life and education ==
May was born in Dublin, Ireland on 14 March 1860. He was the 4th son of Rt. Hon. George Augustus Chichester May, Lord Chief Justice of Ireland, and his wife Olivia Barrington. May was educated at Harrow School and Trinity College, Dublin, where a few of his predecessors to the Governorship of Hong Kong attended school. May received the 1st Honourman and Prizeman Classics and Modern Languages and B.A. in 1881.

== Career ==
In 1881, May was appointed to a Hong Kong Cadetship after a competitive examination. In 1886, he became the Assistant Protector of Chinese and private secretary to Governor Sir William Des Vœux. He was also the private secretary to Acting Administrator Digby Barker from 1889 to 1891.

May would hold the office of Assistant Colonial Secretary in 1891 and Acting Colonial Treasurer in 1892. He was made a member of the Legislative Council in 1895.

From 1893 to 1901, May was the Captain Superintendent of the Hong Kong Police Force, and Superintendent of Victoria Gaol and Fire Brigade between 1896 and 1902.

He was appointed to the position of Colonial Secretary for Hong Kong in April 1902, serving until 21 January 1911, and as such was appointed acting administrator of Hong Kong during transitions totalling almost a year between governors in 1903-1904 and 1907. In 1911, May was appointed Governor of Fiji and High Commissioner Western Pacific, a position he would hold until 1912.

== Governor of Hong Kong ==
In 1912, May was appointed Governor of Hong Kong, a position he occupied in his own right until 1918. It was also his last post in the Colonial Service.

May was the only Governor of Hong Kong to be the target of an assassination attempt. He was fired upon near the General Post Office as he rode in a sedan chair after arriving from Fiji in July 1912. May was not injured; the bullet lodged in the sedan of his wife. The gunman, Li Hung-hung, had a grudge against May. Several years before, this former Police Superintendent had imprisoned Li's father, an undesirable mainland immigrant. May used a car for daily transport from then onwards.

On 22 January 1918, May personally negotiated with the remaining member of a gang holed up in the "Siege of Gresson Street", following a running gun battle through the streets of Wanchai in which five police officers were killed.

In 1919, due to deteriorating health condition, May was relieved of his duty as the Governor.

== Personal ==
In 1891 May married Helena Barker, the daughter and heiress of Acting Administrator Major-General Sir Digby Barker of Clare Priory in Suffolk. They had four daughters, Stella, Phoebe, Iris and Dionne. Stella married General Philip de Fonblanque. Iris (Olivia Helena) married Edward Hamilton Johnston the Sanskritist in the early 1920s.

He died at Clare Priory, Suffolk, England. He is buried at Clare, Suffolk.

== Honours ==
- K.St.J.
- J.P. for Suffolk
- C.M.G., 1895
- G.C.M.G., 1919

== Publications ==
- Guide to Cantonese Colloquial
- Yachting in Hong-Kong

== Places named after him ==
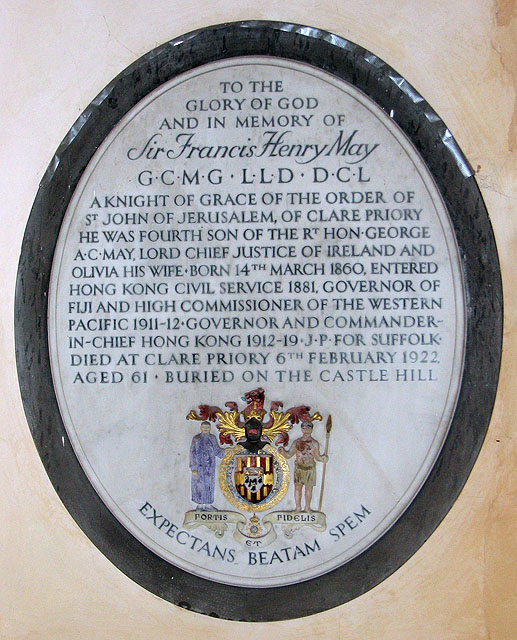
Monument to Sir Francis May in Clare Church, Suffolk

May Road, a roadway in the Upper Mid-Levels area in Hong Kong Island, and May Hall of the University of Hong Kong were named after him. Also, the Helena May Foundation was named after his wife.

== See also ==
- British Hong Kong
- Charles May, after which some "May" places are also named in Hong Kong, including May House.

Police appointments
Preceded by Alexander Herman Adam Gordon	Captain-Superintendent of Police; 1893–1902	Succeeded by Francis Badeley
Government offices
Preceded by James Stewart Lockhart	Colonial Secretary of Hong Kong; 1902–1911	Succeeded by Warren Delabere Barnes
Preceded by Sir Henry Arthur Blake	Governor of Hong Kong (Administrator); 1903–1904	Succeeded by Sir Matthew Nathan
Preceded by Sir Everard F. im Thurn	High Commissioner for the Western Pacific; 1911–1912	Succeeded by Sir Ernest Bickham Sweet-Escott
Preceded by Sir Everard F. im Thurn	Governor of Fiji; 1911–1912	Succeeded by Sir Ernest Bickham Sweet-Escott
Preceded by Claud Severn as Administrator	Governor of Hong Kong; 1912–1919	Succeeded by Claud Severn as Administrator
