= William Gordon Cameron =

British soldier and colonial administrator (1827-1913)

General Sir William Gordon Cameron GCB
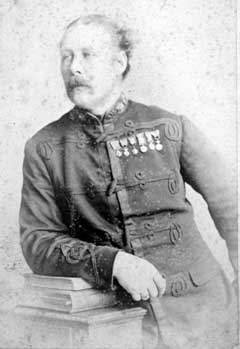
- Born: 16 October 1827; Kingdom of France
- Died: 2 March 1913 (aged 85); Christchurch, Hampshire, England, United Kingdom
- Relatives: Helen Colebrook Mary Cameron (wife); Colonel Aylmer Cameron VC (brother)
- Military career
- Allegiance: United Kingdom
- Branch: British Army
- Service years: 1844–1896
- Rank: General
- Commands: Northern District; Commander of British Troops in China, Hong Kong and the Straits Settlements; Cape Colony
- Conflicts: Crimean War (1854–1856); Abyssinian Expedition (1867–1868)
- Awards: Knight Grand Cross of the Order of the Bath

General Sir William Gordon Cameron GCB (Chinese translated Name: 金馬倫; 16 October 1827 – 2 March 1913) was a British soldier and colonial administrator.

== Military career ==
William Gordon Cameron was commissioned into the 42nd (Royal Highland) Regiment of Foot in 1844. He transferred to the Grenadier Guards in 1847. In 1854 he was deployed to the Crimean War and took part in the Battle of Alma. He was appointed commanding officer of 3rd Regiment of the British German Legion in 1855.

In 1867 he became commanding officer of 1st Battalion 4th King's Own Royal Regiment and led the capture of Magdala during the British Expedition to Abyssinia.

In 1875, he became commander of a brigade at Gibraltar and in 1875 of a brigade at Aldershot. In April 1881 he was appointed general officer commanding Northern District. Then in 1884 he became Commander of British Troops in China, Hong Kong and the Straits Settlements. He governed Hong Kong in a period between April 1887 to October 1887.

He was appointed honorary colonel of the 5th (West Middlesex) Middlesex Rifle Volunteer Corps in 1880.

From January 1891 to December 1892 and then again in May to July 1894 he was administrator of the Cape Colony. He retired in 1895.

== Family ==
General Sir William Gordon Cameron was the son of Lieutenant-Colonel William Gordon Cameron J.P. (1790–1856) and his wife Caroline née Edwards (1801–1872), and the elder brother of Colonel Aylmer Cameron VC, who won the Victoria Cross in 1858 during the Indian Mutiny.

He married Helen Colebrooke Mary, daughter of General Sir John Hunter Littler, GCB on 20 January 1857 in the Church of the Holy Trinity, Buckfastleigh, Devon, England.

== Memory ==
Several places in Hong Kong were named after Cameron: Cameron Road and Cameron Lane in Tsim Sha Tsui, Kowloon, as well as Mount Cameron and Mount Cameron Road.

Military offices
Preceded by George Willis	GOC Northern District; 1881–1884	Succeeded by Frederick Willis
Preceded by John Sargent	Commander of British Troops in China, Hong Kong and the Straits Settlements; 1885–1889	Succeeded by Sir James Edwards
Government offices
Preceded by Acting Administrator William H. Marsh	Administrator of Hong Kong; April–October 1887	Succeeded by Sir William Des Vœux
