= Cecil Hunter-Rodwell =

British colonial administrator

Sir Cecil Hunter Rodwell GCMG

High Commissioner for the Western Pacific
- In office 10 October 1918 – 25 April 1925
- Monarch: George V
- Preceded by: Sir Ernest Sweet-Escott
- Succeeded by: Sir Eyre Hutson

Governor of Fiji
- In office 10 October 1918 – 25 April 1925
- Monarch: George V
- Preceded by: Sir Ernest Sweet-Escott
- Succeeded by: Sir Eyre Hutson

Governor of British Guiana
- In office 31 August 1925 – 7 November 1928
- Monarch: George V
- Preceded by: Graeme Thomson
- Succeeded by: Sir Frederick Guggisberg

Governor of Southern Rhodesia
- In office 24 November 1928 – 1 May 1934
- Monarch: George V
- Prime Minister: Howard Unwin Moffat; George Mitchell; Godfrey Huggins
- Preceded by: Sir Murray Bisset
- Succeeded by: Sir Fraser Russell

Personal details
- Born: 29 December 1874
- Died: 23 February 1953 (aged 78)
- Children: 3 sons, 2 daughters
- Education: University of Cambridge
- Occupation: Colonial administrator, businessman, soldier

Sir Cecil William Hunter-Rodwell GCMG (29 December 1874 – 23 February 1953) was a British colonial administrator who served as Governor of Southern Rhodesia, British Guiana, and Fiji.

== Biography ==
Born in England, Rodwell attended Cheam School and Eton College and went up in 1892 to study at King's College, Cambridge, graduating with a BA in 1896. Upon the outbreak of the South African War, Rodwell joined the Suffolk Yeomanry and was awarded the Queen's Medal with two clasps for bravery.

Rodwell remained in South Africa after the war, working on the staff of Lord Milner, the British High Commissioner in South Africa, from 1901 to 1903 and as Imperial Secretary for the High Commission from 1903 to 1918, during which time he was made a CMG.

In 1918 Rodwell was appointed Governor of Fiji and High Commissioner for the Western Pacific, positions he held until 1924 when he was appointed Governor of British Guiana. During his term the Legislative Council of British Guiana was established and Rodwell did much to develop the economic resources of the colony.

In 1928 Rodwell was appointed Governor of Southern Rhodesia.

Rodwell returned to South Africa to work in the mining industry at the end of his term as Governor of South Rhodesia in 1934, serving on the board of directors of the oil company Ultramar. After retiring and moving to England Rodwell was appointed Controller of Industrial Diamonds in the Ministry of Supply in 1942, serving until 1945.

Rodwell died at his home near Ipswich, survived by his wife, three sons, and two daughters. He was appointed CMG in 1909, KCMG in 1919 and GCMG in 1934.

Government offices
Preceded by Sir Ernest Bickham Sweet-Escott	High Commissioner for the Western Pacific; 1918–1925	Succeeded by Sir Eyre Hutson
Preceded by Sir Ernest Bickham Sweet-Escott	Governor of Fiji; 1918–1925	Succeeded by Sir Eyre Hutson
Preceded by Sir Graeme Thomson	Governor of British Guiana; 1925–1928	Succeeded by Sir Frederick Gordon Guggisberg
Preceded by Murray Bisset	Governor of Southern Rhodesia; 1928–1934	Succeeded by Fraser Russell
