= Miles Gerald Keon =

Irish journalist, novelist and colonial secretary (1821-1875)

Miles Gerald Keon (20 February 1821 – 3 June 1875) was an Irish Roman Catholic journalist, novelist, colonial secretary and lecturer.

== Biography ==
He was born on 20 February 1821, last descendant of the Keons, of Keonbrooke, County Leitrim, Ireland; he died at Bermuda on 3 June 1875. He was the only son of Myles Gerald Keon, barrister, and on his mother's side was descended from the Fallons of Runnymede, County Roscommon. Both parents dying in his infancy, Keon was left to the care of his maternal grandmother, Countess Magawley, and later to that of his uncle, Francis Philip, Count Magawly. He studied at the Jesuit college at Stonyhurst, where he wrote the prize poem on Queen Victoria's accession (Stonyhurst Magazine, no. 32). An adventurous pedestrian tour across the European continent followed graduation, terminating in a brief service in the French army in Algeria.

On his return to England he studied law at Gray's Inn, abandoning it shortly for literary pursuits. In 1843 he published "The Irish Revolution, or What can the Repealers do? And what shall be the New Constitution?" ("Tablet", IV, 532), and in 1845 a vindication of the Jesuits (Oxford and Cambridge Review, September, 1845), a controversial article that provoked more than passing interest. The results of his pedestrian tour and military service were apparent in a series of contributions to Colburn's "United Service Magazine" (from September, 1845 to October, 1846). For a few months in 1846 he became editor of "Dolman's Magazine".

On 21 November 1846, he married Anne de la Pierre, daughter of an English army officer.

In 1847 appeared his "Life of Saint Alexis, the Roman Patrician". For the next twelve years he served on the staff of The Morning Post, becoming its representative at St. Petersburg in 1850. In 1852 his first novel, Harding, the Money-Spinner, appeared, serially, in the London Journal. In 1856, on the occasion of the coronation of Alexander II of Russia, he was sent to St. Petersburg representing The Morning Post. On this occasion he met Boucher de Perthes, in whose reminiscences Keon is pleasantly appreciated.

He spend a year in India in 1858. On his return in 1859 from Calcutta in British India, where he had been sent "under a mistaken arrangement" to edit the "Bengal Hurkaru", he was appointed colonial secretary at Bermuda, a position which he held until his death. The year following, at Mechanics' Hall, Hamilton, he gave a course of lectures on "Government, its Source, its Form, and its Means", declining subsequently to lecture in the United States on account of his official position. He attended the opening of the First Vatican Council at Rome in 1869.

== Publications ==
- Harding, the Money-Spinner (1852)
- Dion and the Sibyls (1866)

== Sources ==
Attribution
