= Robert Christopher Stafford Stanley =

British colonial administrator

Sir Robert Stanley KBE, CMG, OBE

17th High Commissioner for the Western Pacific
- In office 3 July 1952 – July 1955
- Monarch: Elizabeth II
- Preceded by: Sir Brian Freeston
- Succeeded by: Sir John Gutch

1st Governor of the Solomon Islands
- In office 1 January 1953 – July 1955
- Monarch: Elizabeth II
- Preceded by: Sir Henry Gregory-Smith; As Resident Commissioner
- Succeeded by: Sir John Gutch

Personal details
- Born: 12 May 1899
- Died: 15 November 1983 (aged 84)

Sir Robert Christopher Stafford Stanley, KBE, CMG, OBE (12 May 1899 – 15 November 1983) was a British colonial administrator.

After serving as Chief Secretary of Northern Rhodesia, he was appointed High Commissioner of the Western Pacific in January 1952, although he did not arrive in Suva, Fiji, until June, taking up his duties on 3 July. He was the first person to hold the office separately from the Governor of Fiji, the two positions having been joined since 1877. After touring the Solomon Islands, New Hebrides, and the Gilbert and Ellice Islands in September, he moved the High Commission to Headquarters to Honiara in the Solomon Islands on 22 December. On 1 January 1953, he also became Governor of the Solomon Islands. He retired as High Commissioner and Governor in July 1955.

His daughter, Phillada Stanley, was married to Sir Cosmo Haskard, sometime Governor of the Falkland Islands.
