= George Digby Barker =

British Army general

General Sir George Digby Barker GCB
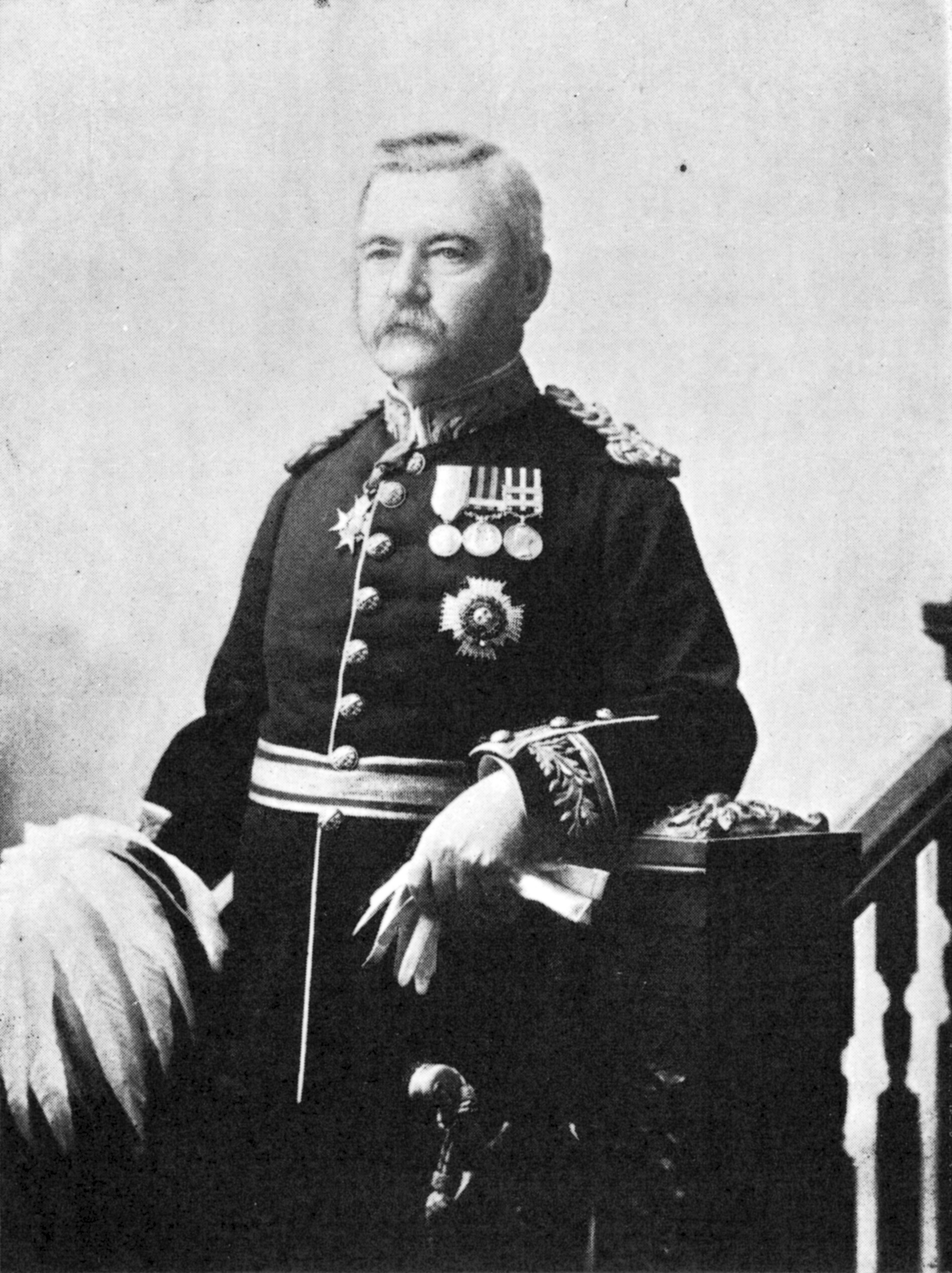
- Barker c. 1906 or earlier
- Born: 9 October 1833; Clare, Suffolk, England
- Died: 15 April 1914 (aged 80); Risbridge, Suffolk, United Kingdom
- Military career
- Allegiance: United Kingdom
- Branch: British Army
- Rank: General
- Commands: Commander of British Troops in China and Hong Kong; General Officer Commanding (or Commander-in-Chief) Bermuda
- Conflicts: Anglo-Persian War; Indian Mutiny
- Awards: Knight Grand Cross of the Order of the Bath

General Sir George Digby Barker GCB (9 October 1833 – 15 April 1914) was a British soldier and colonial administrator.

== Military career ==
Barker was commissioned into the 78th Regiment of Foot in 1853. He served in Anglo-Persian War of 1856 and in the Indian Mutiny of 1857 and was present at Siege of Lucknow.

He went on to become adjutant of his regiment in 1859. He was then made assistant adjutant and quartermaster-general in 1884. Then in 1874 he was made a Professor at the Staff College and in 1877 Assistant Director of Military Education at Headquarters.

He became Commander of British Troops in China and Hong Kong in 1890. Under his command, the size of the garrison increased by 50 per cent in response to Governor Des Voeux's concerns about the defence of the colony.

Barker was briefly the acting administrator of Hong Kong between May and December 1891. Upon Sir William Robinson's arrival to serve as Governor in December 1891, Barker recommended an extension of Hong Kong's northern frontier. The proposed new frontier would extend from Deep Bay to Mirs Bay, and encompass offshore islands within three miles of Hong Kong. This new frontier would eventually be realised in the 1898 Second Convention of Peking in which Britain leased the New Territories.

Barker was then appointed Governor and General Officer Commanding of the Imperial fortress colony of Bermuda, with its large garrison, in 1896 and retired in 1902.

He was colonel of the North Staffordshire Regiment from 1905 to 1911 and of the Seaforth Highlanders from 1911 to 1914.

In retirement he lived at Clare Priory in Suffolk.

== Memory ==
Barker Road, where the Residence of the Chief Secretary is located (Victoria House – 15 Barker Road), on The Peak was named after him.

== Family ==
Barker married twice. In 1862 he married Frances Isabella Murray, daughter of George Murray, of Rosemount, Ross-shire. She died in 1900. They had a son and two daughters. One of their daughters, Helena Barker, married in 1891 Francis Henry May, who would become Governor of Hong Kong from 1912 to 1919. The Helena May Institute was named after her. General Barker remarried on 30 September 1902 Katherine Weston Elwes, daughter of Edward Golding Elwes, of London.

Military offices
Preceded by Sir James Edwards	Commander of British Troops in China and Hong Kong; 1890–1895	Succeeded by Sir Wilsone Black
Government offices
Preceded by Sir William Des Vœux	Administrator of Hong Kong; May 1891 – December 1891	Succeeded by William Robinson
