= Arthur Richards, 1st Baron Milverton =

British colonial administrator (1885-1978)

The Right Honourable The Lord Milverton GCMG
- Richards in 1936

Governor of North Borneo
- In office 1930–1933
- Monarch: George V
- Preceded by: Sir John Humphreys
- Succeeded by: Sir Douglas Jardine

Governor of Gambia
- In office 12 April 1933 – 22 October 1936
- Monarchs: George V Edward VIII
- Preceded by: Sir Herbert Palmer
- Succeeded by: Sir Thomas Southorn

High Commissioner for the Western Pacific Governor of Fiji
- In office 28 November 1936 – August 1938
- Monarchs: Edward VIII; George VI
- Preceded by: Sir Cecil Barton (acting)
- Succeeded by: Sir Cecil Barton (acting)

Governor of Jamaica
- In office 19 August 1938 – July 1943
- Monarch: George VI
- Preceded by: Charles Campbell Woolley (acting)
- Succeeded by: William Henry Flinn (acting)

Governor of Nigeria
- In office 18 December 1943 – 5 February 1948
- Monarch: George VI
- Preceded by: Sir Bernard Bourdillon
- Succeeded by: Sir John Macpherson

Personal details
- Born: 21 February 1885 Bedminster, Bristol, England, United Kingdom
- Died: 27 October 1978 (aged 93) Cox Green, Berkshire, England, United Kingdom
- Spouse: Noelle Bënda Whitehead (m. 1927–1978; his death)

Arthur Frederick Richards, 1st Baron Milverton GCMG (21 February 1885 – 27 October 1978), was a British colonial administrator who over his career served as Governor of North Borneo, Gambia, Fiji, Jamaica, and Nigeria.

== Early life and education ==
Richards was born in Bristol in 1885, the son of William Richards. He was educated at Clifton College in Bristol, and graduated from Christ Church, Oxford, in 1907 with a BA.

== Colonial service ==
Richards entered the Malayan Civil Service in 1908. By 1921, he had become the Acting 1st Assistant Colonial Secretary for the Straits Settlements. He served as Acting Under-Secretary of the Federated Malay States in 1926, and became full Under-Secretary from 1927 to 1929. He was the Acting General Advisor in Johore between 1929 and 1920, and from 1930 to 1933 he served as the governor of Northern Borneo. Following this, he served as Governor of the Gambia from 1933 to 1936.

He served as Governor of Fiji from 1936 to 1938, holding this office concurrently with the position of High Commissioner for the Western Pacific. From 1938 to 1943, he served as Governor of Jamaica. From 1943 to 1948, he served as Governor of Nigeria.

He was known in the Colonial Service as 'Old Sinister'. He became the first Colonial Office official to be raised to the peerage while still in office. In 1986, his former private secretary in Nigeria, Richard Peel, published a memoir of Richards, titled Old Sinister: A Memoir of Sir Arthur Richards.

== Politics ==
In the House of Lords Milverton sat for the Labour Party until 1949 when, objecting to Labour's nationalisation plans, he joined the Liberal Party. Soon after that he joined the Conservative Party.

== Honours ==
He was made a CMG in 1933, elevated to KCMG in 1935, and again to GCMG in 1942. In 1947 he was raised to the peerage as Baron Milverton, of Lagos and of Clifton in the City of Bristol. He was also appointed as K.St.J., and was awarded the US Medal of Freedom with Silver Palm.

== Family ==
In 1927, Richards married Noelle Bënda Whitehead (18 December 1904 – 11 September 2010), daughter of Charles Basil Whitehead. He died in October 1978, aged 93, and was succeeded in the Barony by his eldest son, the Revd Fraser Arthur Richard Richards. The Second Baron Milverton died in August 2023 and was succeeded in the title by his brother, Michael Hugh Richards (born 1 August 1936), Third Baron Milverton.

== Arms ==
Coat of arms of Arthur Richards, 1st Baron Milverton
Crest A Malay tiger’s head erased Proper gorged with a collar lozengy Argent and Gules. Escutcheon Argent three lozenges conjoined in fess Gules between two barrulets Sable all within two flaunches of the second both charged with a spear head of the field. Supporters On either side a Malay tiger Proper gorged with a collar lozengy Argent and Gules. Motto Mens Cujusque Id Est Quisque

Government offices
Preceded by John Lisseter Humphreys	Governor of North Borneo; 1930–1933	Succeeded by Douglas James Jardine
Preceded by Herbert Richmond Palmer	Governor of The Gambia; 1934–1936	Succeeded by Thomas Southorn
Preceded by Sir Arthur George Murchison Fletcher	High Commissioner for the Western Pacific; 1936–1938	Succeeded by Sir Harry Charles Luke
Preceded by Sir Arthur George Murchison Fletcher	Governor of Fiji; 1936–1938	Succeeded by Sir Harry Charles Luke
Preceded by Charles Campbell Woolley, acting	Governor of Jamaica; 1938–1943	Succeeded by William Henry Flinn, acting
Preceded by Bernard Henry Bourdillon	Governor of Nigeria; 1943–1948	Succeeded by John Stuart Macpherson
Peerage of the United Kingdom
New creation	Baron Milverton; 1947–1978	Succeeded by Fraser Arthur Richard Richards
