= John Gutch (colonial administrator) =

British colonial administrator (1905–1988)

Sir John Gutch KCMG, OBE

18th High Commissioner for the Western Pacific
- In office 1955 – 4 March 1961
- Monarch: Elizabeth II
- Preceded by: Sir Robert Stanley
- Succeeded by: Sir David Trench

2nd Governor of the Solomon Islands
- In office 1955 – 4 March 1961
- Monarch: Elizabeth II
- Preceded by: Sir Robert Stanley
- Succeeded by: Sir David Trench

Personal details
- Born: 12 July 1905
- Died: 11 February 1988 (aged 82)

Sir John Gutch, KCMG, OBE (12 July 1905 – 11 February 1988) was a British colonial administrator.

His career in the Colonial Service began in 1928, with his appointment as an Assistant District Commissioner in the Gold Coast (now Ghana). In 1934, he was promoted to Assistant Colonial Secretary. He was posted to the Mandate of Palestine in 1936, eventually becoming Principal Commissioner. He was one of the survivors of the King David Hotel bombing in Jerusalem on 22 July 1946. He was posted by the Foreign Office to Cyrenaica in 1948. He became Chief Secretary of British Guiana in 1950. From September 1955 to January 1961, he was Governor of the Solomon Islands and High Commissioner for the Western Pacific. In this role he oversaw not only the Solomon Islands but also the New Hebrides and the Gilbert and Ellice Islands. During his term, the Solomon Islands took their first steps towards self-government, with the establishment of the first Legislative Council.

Gutch was awarded the OBE and a knighthood in 1957.
