= Claud Hollis =

British colonial administrator (1874–1961)

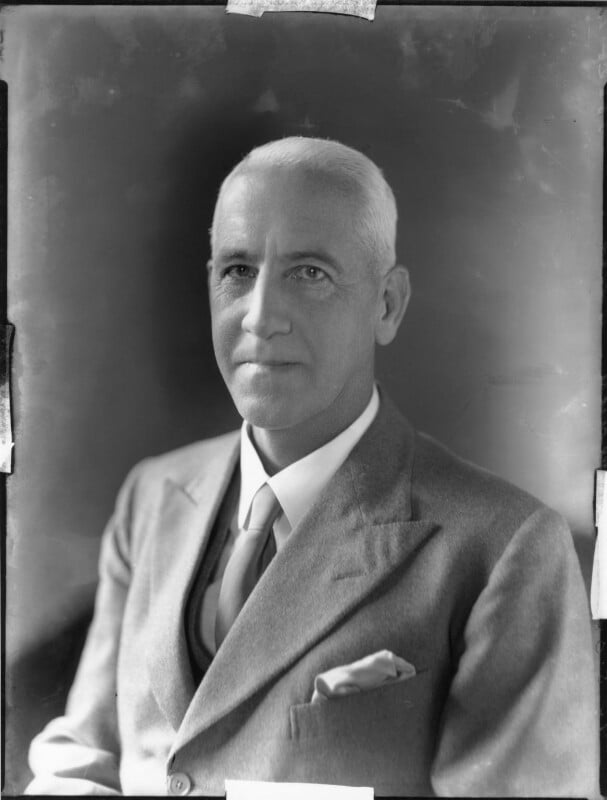
Hollis in 1934

Sir Alfred Claud Hollis GCMG CBE (12 May 1874 – 22 November 1961) was a British colonial administrator who served as British Resident to the Sultan of Zanzibar between 1923 and 1929 and Governor of Trinidad and Tobago between 1930 and 1936 and author of a historical account of Spanish Trinidad.

== Education and career ==
Hollis was born in Highgate, London, and was privately educated in England, Switzerland and Germany.

He worked for a commercial company in German East Africa (1893–1996) and in 1897 was appointed assistant collector in the British East Africa Protectorate. He wrote pioneering works on the Maasai (1905) and the Nandi people (1908). During his time in East Africa, he took part in numerous expeditions including the Uganda Mutiny (1897–98) and the Jubaland Expedition (1900–01). Between 1901 and 1907, he worked as Secretary to the East Africa Protectorate administration, and he was Secretary for Native Affairs between 1907 and 1913.

In 1913, Hollis took up the post of colonial secretary in Sierra Leone and in 1920, he was appointed chief secretary in Tanganyika. In 1924 he became British Resident Minister in Zanzibar.

In 1930 Hollis was made governor of Trinidad and Tobago and held that post until his retirement in 1936. He came into conflict with Arthur Andrew Cipriani over the transfer of the electric works to the authority of the Port of Spain City Corporation.

Hollis died at the age of 87 in Cambridge.

== Pitt Rivers Museum controversy ==
In 2017, the Maasai activist Samwel Nangiria discovered that many Maasai objects donated by Hollis to the Pitt Rivers Museum had been mislabelled and likely either stolen and taken by the Maasai under coercion. After the discovery, the museum's director Laura Van Broekhoven worked in collaboration with Maasai activists and academics to relabel and recontextualise the Pitt River's Maasai collections. He also stole the Ngaji sacred drum of the Pokomo tribe and donated it to the British Museum.

Government offices
Preceded by Horace Archer Byatt	Governor of Trinidad and Tobago; 1930–1936	Succeeded by Arthur George Murchison Fletcher
