= John Waddington (colonial administrator) =

English colonial administrator

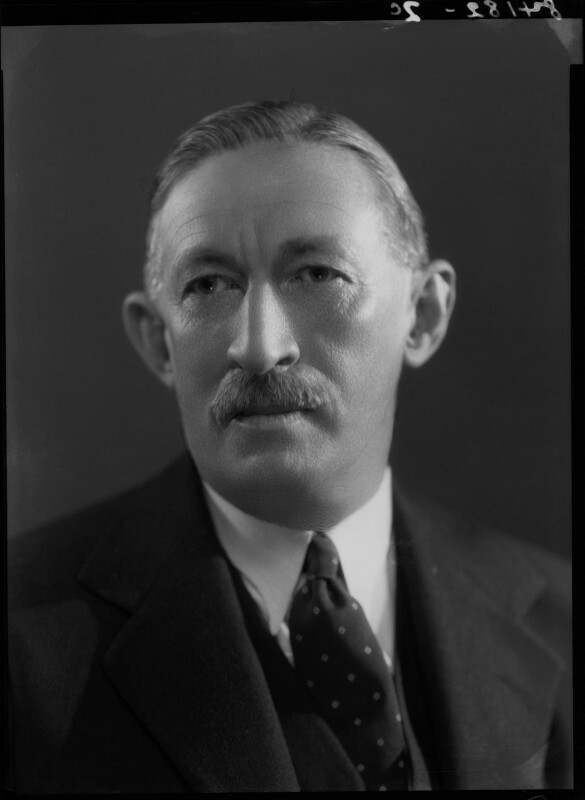
Waddington in 1938

Sir Eubule John Waddington, GBE, KCMG, KCVO (9 April 1890 – 18 January 1957) was an English colonial administrator.

== Biography ==
He was educated at Saltus Grammar School, Bermuda, at Dulwich College, England, and later as a Rhodes Scholar at Merton College, Oxford, where he studied from 1909 to 1913.

He served in the Administrative Service in Kenya from 1914 to 1932, Colonial Secretary of Bermuda from 1932 to 1935, and of British Guiana from 1935 to 1938.

He served as Governor of Barbados from 1938 to 1941, and Governor of Northern Rhodesia from to 1941 to 1947. After leaving the Colonial Service, he was Chairman of the International African Institute from 1949 until his death.

Government offices
Preceded by Sir Mark Aitchison Young	Governor of Barbados; 1938 to 1941	Succeeded by Sir Grattan Bushe
Preceded by William Marston Logan (acting)	Governor of Northern Rhodesia; 1941 to 1947	Succeeded by Robert Christopher Stafford Stanley (acting)
