= William Hart-Bennett =

British colonial governor (1861–1918)

William M. Hart-Bennett CMG

Governor of British Honduras
- In office 29 January 1918 – 4 September 1918
- Preceded by: Wilfred Collet
- Succeeded by: Eyre Hutson

Personal details
- Born: 1861
- Died: 1918 (aged 56–57) Belize City
- Citizenship: British

William M. Hart-Bennett CMG (1861–1918) was a British government official who served overseas. He was a British colonial minister in Nassau, Bahamas, and a governor of British Honduras (now known as Belize) from 29 January 1918 to 4 September 1918, and before that was employed as Colonial Secretary of the Bahamas.

== Personal life ==
Hart-Bennett was married on 27 April 1899 to Ella Mary Tuck, the daughter of Charles E. Tuck and his second wife Emily Mary Tuck of Norwich, England.

Ella was an author and a prominent figure in Nassau's society. She was president of the Nassau Dumb Friends League and a member of the Imperial Order Daughters of the Empire. She is best remembered as the author of the book An English Girl In Japan (1906). Ella died at the age of 49 in the sinking of the RMS Empress of Ireland on 29 May 1914.

== Death and legacy ==
Bennett himself died on 4 September 1918 from injuries sustained in a fire on 17 August 1918, when a flagpole at the courthouse in Belize fell on him.

A new building (which now serves the Supreme Court of Belize) was completed in 1926, and its clock tower memorializes him.
