= Bickham Sweet-Escott =

British colonial administrator (1857–1941)

Sir Bickham Sweet-Escott KCMG
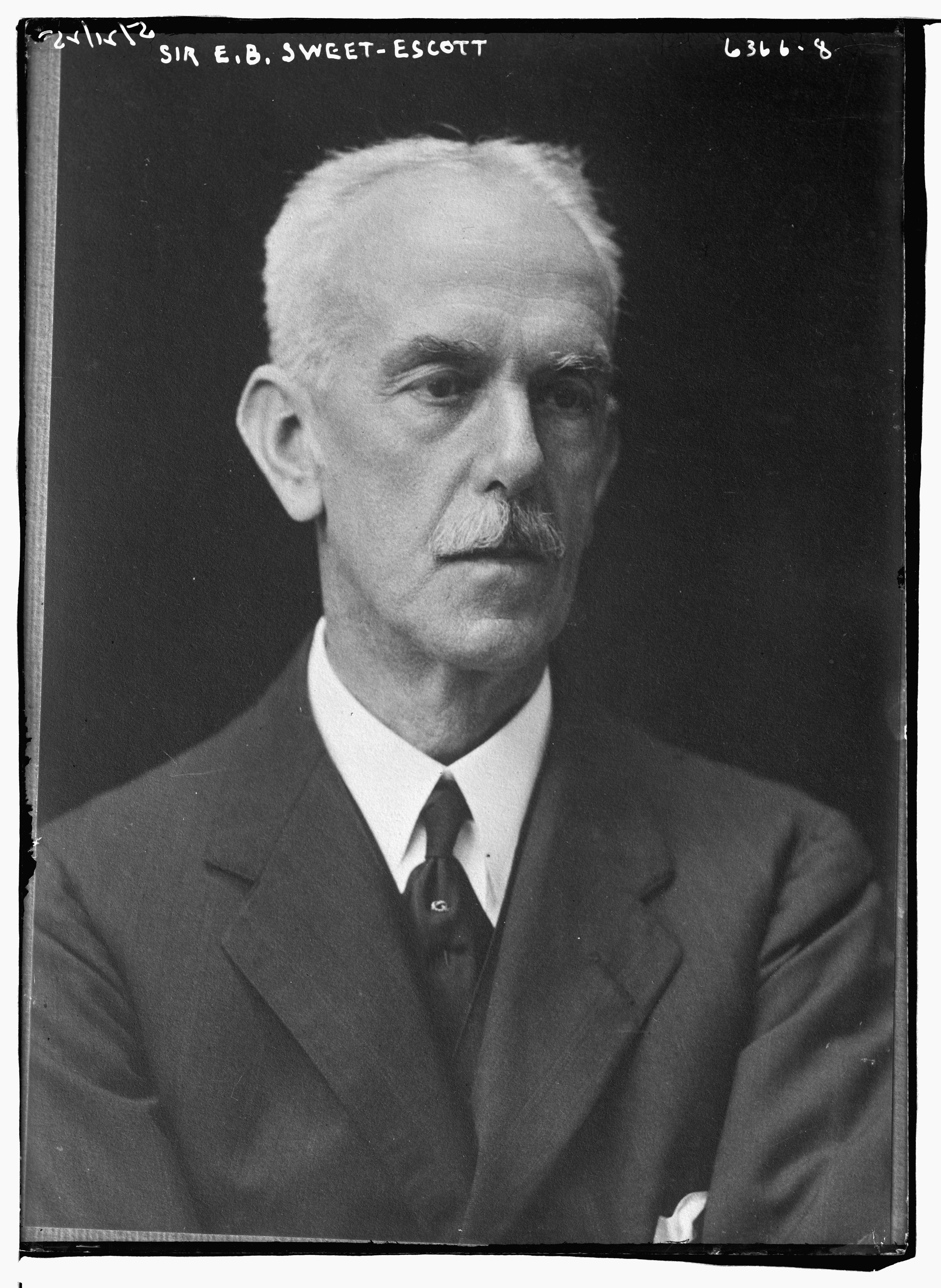
- Sweet-Escott in 1924

3rd Administrator of the Seychelles
- In office August 1899 – November 1903
- Preceded by: Henry Cockburn Stewart
- Succeeded by: Himself (as Governor)

1st Governor of the Seychelles
- In office November 1903 – 1904
- Monarch: Edward VII
- Preceded by: Himself (as Administrator)
- Succeeded by: Walter Edward Davidson

4th Governor of British Honduras
- In office 15 April 1904 – 1906
- Monarch: Edward VII
- Preceded by: David Wilson
- Succeeded by: Eric John Eagles Swayne

34th Governor of the Leeward Islands
- In office 1906–1912
- Preceded by: Clement Courtenay Knollys
- Succeeded by: Henry Hesketh Bell

9th High Commissioner for the Western Pacific
- In office 25 July 1912 – 10 October 1918
- Preceded by: Francis Henry May
- Succeeded by: Cecil Hunter-Rodwell

10th Governor of Fiji
- In office 25 July 1912 – 10 October 1918
- Preceded by: Francis Henry May
- Succeeded by: Cecil Hunter-Rodwell

Personal details
- Born: 20 August 1857 Bath, Somerset, England
- Died: 9 April 1941 (aged 83) Worthing, England
- Spouse(s): Mary Jane Hunt, Lady Sweet-Escott (m. 1881)

Sir Ernest Bickham Sweet-Escott, KCMG (20 August 1857 – 9 April 1941) was a British colonial administrator who was in turn governor of the British Seychelles, British Honduras, British Leeward Islands and British Fiji.

== Early years ==
Sweet-Escott was born at Bath, the fifth son of the Rev. Hay Sweet-Escott, headmaster of Somersetshire College, Bath, and Rector of Kilve, Somerset, by his wife Eliza, daughter of Rev. John Coombes Collins, Vicar of St John's Bridgwater. He was educated at the Royal Somersetshire College, Bath, Bromsgrove School and Balliol College, Oxford. From 1881 he was professor of classics at the Royal College of Mauritius.

In 1886 he became assistant colonial secretary at Mauritius and was promoted in 1889 to acting colonial secretary. His next posting was in British Honduras from May 1893 until September 1898 when he returned to take up a post as acting government clerk at the Colonial Office.

== Colonial administrator ==
Sweet-Escott then became administrator of the Seychelles in June 1899 and then Governor of the Seychelles when the post was created from 1903 to 1904. He was knighted in 1904 and became Governor of British Honduras from 15 April 1904 to 13 August 1906. From 1906 until 1912 he was Governor of the Leeward Islands.

Sweet-Escott became Governor of Fiji on 25 July 1912 and was also High Commissioner and Consul General for the West Pacific region. During World War I a German squadron under Maximilian von Spee was a day away from Fiji. Sweet-Escott wired a message to the Australian fleet, then 2000 miles away, which the Germans intercepted and von Spee was convinced that he was heading for a trap, turned away and laughed at the "fool of a governor for giving the show away". Sweet-Escott's term of office ended on 10 October 1918.

== Miscellaneous ==
Sweet-Escott instituted the Escott Shield as a rugby trophy in 1913, which was first won by the Pacific Club.

Sweet-Escott married Mary Jane Hunt on 14 December 1881 and had five children.

Sweet-Escott was appointed a Order of St Michael and St George in the 1895 Birthday Honours, and a Knight Companion of the Order in the 1904 Birthday Honours.

Government offices
Preceded by Henry Cockburn Stewart	Administrator of the Seychelles; 1899–1903	Succeeded by Himself as Governor
Preceded by Himself as Administrator	Governor of the Seychelles; 1903–1904	Succeeded by Walter Edward Davidson
Preceded by David Wilson	Governor of British Honduras; 1904–1906	Succeeded by Eric John Eagles Swayne
Preceded by Clement Courtenay Knollys	Governor of the Leeward Islands; 1906–1912	Succeeded by Henry Hesketh Bell
Preceded by Sir Francis May	High Commissioner for the Western Pacific; 1912–1918	Succeeded by Sir Cecil Hunter-Rodwell
Preceded by Sir Francis May	Governor of Fiji; 1912–1918	Succeeded by Sir Cecil Hunter-Rodwell
