= William Robinson (colonial administrator, born 1836) =

British colonial governor (1836-1912)

Sir William Robinson GCMG
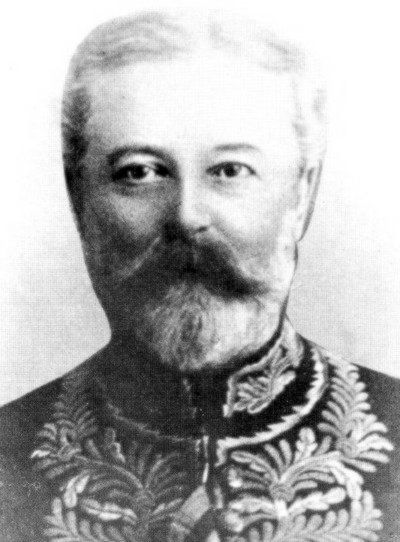

11th Governor of Hong Kong
- In office 10 December 1891 – 25 November 1898
- Monarch: Victoria
- Lieutenant Governor: MG Sir George Barker; MG Sir Wilsone Black
- Colonial Secretary: Francis Fleming; G.T.M. O'Brien; Sir Stewart Lockhart
- Preceded by: Sir William Des Vœux
- Succeeded by: Sir Henry Arthur Blake

Personal details
- Born: 9 February 1836 Wetherden, Suffolk, England
- Died: 1 December 1912 (aged 76) 28 Evelyn Mansions, Carlisle Place, London, England
- Spouses: Juliana Sophia Dampier (m. 1862; died 1881) Felicia Ida Helen Rattray (m. 1884; died 1894)
- Profession: Colonial administrator

Chinese name
- Traditional Chinese: 羅便臣
- Simplified Chinese: 罗便臣
Transcriptions
Yue: Cantonese
- Jyutping: lo4 bin6 san4

Sir William Robinson GCMG (Chinese: 羅便臣; 9 February 1836 – 1 December 1912) was a British colonial governor who was the last Governor of Trinidad and the first Governor of the merged colony of Trinidad and Tobago. He was also the 11th Governor of Hong Kong.

== Early life and colonial services ==
Robinson was born in 1836 in Suffolk, England. He was the eldest son of the Rev. Isaac Banks Robinson and Jane Susan (née Syer). He entered the Colonial Office at age 18 as a clerk, and within several years served as private secretary to Herman Merivale, Frederic Rogers and Edward Cardwell.

He became a Member of Slave Trade Commission in 1869 and was appointed Governor of Bahama Isles from 1874 to 1880. A year later, Robinson was appointed governor of the Windward Islands, a position he held until 1884. Afterwards, he became Governor of Barbados, and was transferred to become the Governor of Trinidad a year later. In 1889 the colony of Tobago was merged with Trinidad into the united colony of Trinidad and Tobago, with Robinson as its first governor, a position he held until 1891.

== Governor of Hong Kong ==
In 1891, Robinson was appointed Governor of Hong Kong, a position he served until 1898 and later became his last post in the Colonial Services. During his tenure, Sun Yet-Sen graduated from the colony's Medical School. Also, Robinson received the thanks of the Hong Kong government for the settlement of the Fanny Josephine affair (Venezuela).

== Personal life ==
Robinson married twice. He married his first wife, Julia Sophia Dampier, 17 July 1862 at St. Saviour's Church, Paddington. The couple had three sons. She died in 1881 and Robinson married Felicia Ida Helen Rattray three years later, 21 July 1884 in Nassau. She died ten years later and is buried in Hong Kong Cemetery. The couple had three daughters. Robinson himself died of heart disease on 1 December 1912 in London.

== Honours ==
- CMG, 1877
- KCMG, 1883
- GCMG, 1897

== Places named after him ==
Robinson Road, a major thoroughfare in Nassau, Bahamas, is named after Sir William Robinson, during whose term it was laid out. Despite public perceptions to the contrary, there are no places in Hong Kong named after Sir William Robinson. Places in Hong Kong with the name Robinson were actually named for an earlier Governor, Hercules Robinson, later the 1st Baron Rosmead. Robinson, Mark Aitchison Young and Christopher Patten are the only former Governors of Hong Kong who have no places in Hong Kong named in their honour.

== See also ==
- History of Hong Kong

Government offices
Preceded by Sir John Pope Hennessy	Governor of the Bahamas; 1874–1880	Succeeded by Jeremiah Thomas Fitzgerald Callaghan
Preceded by D. J. Gamble, acting	Governor of Barbados and the Windward Islands; 1880–1885	Succeeded by Sir Charles Cameron Lees as Governor of Barbados
Preceded by D. J. Gamble, acting	Governor of Barbados and the Windward Islands; 1880–1885	Succeeded by Sir Walter Joseph Sendall as Governor of the Windward Islands
Preceded by Sir Arthur Elibank Havelock	Governor of Trinidad; 1885–1889	Post abolished
Preceded by himself as Governor of Trinidad	Governor of Trinidad and Tobago; 1889–1891	Succeeded by Sir Frederick Napier Broome
Preceded by J. C. O'Halloran as Governor of Tobago	Governor of Trinidad and Tobago; 1889–1891	Succeeded by Sir Frederick Napier Broome
Preceded by Major-General Digby Barker as Acting Administrator	11th Governor of Hong Kong; 1891–1898	Succeeded by Major-General Wilsone Black as Acting Administrator
