= Governor of Fiji =

- Flag of the governor of Fiji from 1908 to 1970
- Style: His Excellency The Right Honourable
- Residence: Government House, Suva
- Appointer: King/Queen of the United Kingdom
- Formation: 10 October 1874
- First holder: Sir Hercules Robinson
- Final holder: Sir Robert Sidney Foster
- Abolished: 10 October 1970
- Succession: Governor-General of Fiji

Fiji was a British Crown colony from 1874 to 1970, and an independent dominion in the Commonwealth from 1970 to 1987. During this period, the head of state was the British monarch, but in practice the functions of the crown were normally exercised locally by the governor prior to independence (on 10 October 1970), and by the governor-general prior to the proclamation of a republic on 7 October 1987.

From 1877 to 3 July 1952, governors of Fiji were also high commissioners for the Western Pacific.

== List of governors of Fiji (1874–1970) ==
Following is a list of people who have served as governor of Fiji.

No.	Portrait	Name (Birth–Death)	Term of office		Monarch
No.	Portrait	Name (Birth–Death)	Took office	Left office	Monarch
Colony of Fiji
1	Sir Hercules Robinson (1824–1897)		10 October 1874	June 1875	Victoria
2	Sir Arthur Hamilton-Gordon (1829–1912)		19 August 1875	1880	Victoria
3	Sir William Des Vœux (1834–1909)		20 December 1880	21 January 1885	Victoria
—	John Bates Thurston (1836–1897); Acting Governor		21 January 1885	1 January 1887	Victoria
4	Sir Charles Mitchell (1836–1899)		1 January 1887	February 1888	Victoria
5	Sir John Bates Thurston (1836–1897)		February 1888	7 February 1897	Victoria
6	Sir George T. M. O'Brien (1844–1906)		March 1897	1901	Victoria
—	Sir William Allardyce (1861–1930); Acting Governor		1901	10 September 1902	Edward VII
7	Sir Henry Jackson (1849–1908)		10 September 1902	11 October 1904	Edward VII
8	Sir Everard im Thurn (1852–1932)		11 October 1904	1910	Edward VII
—	Sir Charles Major (1860–1933); Acting Governor		1910	21 February 1911	Edward VII
—	Sir Charles Major (1860–1933); Acting Governor		1910	21 February 1911	George V
9	Sir Francis May (1860–1922)		21 February 1911	25 July 1912	George V
10	Sir Ernest Sweet-Escott (1857–1941)		25 July 1912	10 October 1918	George V
—	Sir Eyre Hutson (1864–1936); Acting for Sweet-Escott		1915	1916	George V
11	Sir Cecil Hunter-Rodwell (1874–1953)		10 October 1918	25 April 1925	George V
—	Sir Eyre Hutson (1864–1936); Acting for Hunter-Rodwell		1919	1919	George V
12	Sir Eyre Hutson (1864–1936)		25 April 1925	22 November 1929	George V
13	Sir Murchison Fletcher (1878–1954)		22 November 1929	May 1936	George V
13	Sir Murchison Fletcher (1878–1954)		22 November 1929	May 1936	Edward VIII
—	Sir Juxon Barton (1891–1980); Acting Governor		May 1936	November 1936	Edward VIII
14	Sir Arthur Richards (1885–1978)		28 November 1936	August 1938	Edward VIII
14	Sir Arthur Richards (1885–1978)		28 November 1936	August 1938	George VI
—	Sir Juxon Barton (1891–1980); Acting Governor		August 1938	September 1938	George VI
15	Sir Harry Luke (1884–1969)		16 September 1938	20 July 1942	George VI
—	Alexander Theodore Newboult (1896–1964); Acting Governor		20 July 1942	22 July 1942	George VI
16	Sir Philip Mitchell (1890–1964)		22 July 1942	12 January 1944	George VI
—	Sir John Rankine (1907–1987); Acting Governor		12 January 1944	4 May 1944	George VI
—	Sir John Nicoll (1899–1981); Acting Governor		4 May 1944	23 October 1944	George VI
—	Sir John Rankine (1907–1987); Acting Governor		23 October 1944	1 January 1945	George VI
17	Sir Alexander Grantham (1899–1978)		1 January 1945	21 March 1947	George VI
—	Sir John Nicoll (1899–1981); Acting Governor		21 March 1947	8 October 1947	George VI
18	Sir Brian Freeston (1892–1958)		8 October 1947	6 October 1952	George VI
18	Sir Brian Freeston (1892–1958)		8 October 1947	6 October 1952	Elizabeth II
19	Sir Ronald Garvey (1903–1991)		6 October 1952	28 October 1958	Elizabeth II
20	Sir Kenneth Maddocks (1907–2001)		28 October 1958	6 January 1964	Elizabeth II
21	Sir Derek Jakeway (1915–1993)		6 January 1964	December 1968	Elizabeth II
22	Sir Robert Sidney Foster (1913–2005)		December 1968	10 October 1970	Elizabeth II

In 1970, Fiji gained independence from the United Kingdom. After independence, the viceroy in Fiji was the governor-general of Fiji.

== Governor's flag ==
Governor's flag, 1908–1970

Governor's flag, 1903–1908

Governor's flag, 1883–1903

Governor's flag, 1877–1883

== See also ==
- Governor-General of Fiji
- List of heads of state of Fiji
