= Murchison Fletcher =

British colonial administrator

Sir Murchison Fletcher KCMG CBE
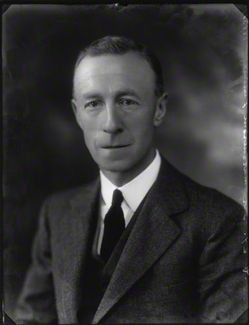
- Sir Arthur George Murchison Fletcher

Acting Governor of British Ceylon
- In office June 1927 – 20 August 1928
- Monarch: George V
- Preceded by: Hugh Clifford
- Succeeded by: Herbert Stanley

12th High Commissioner for the Western Pacific
- In office 22 November 1929 – May 1936
- Monarchs: George V Edward VIII
- Preceded by: Sir Eyre Hutson

13th Governor of Fiji
- In office 22 November 1929 – May 1936
- Monarchs: George V Edward VIII
- Preceded by: Sir Eyre Hutson
- Succeeded by: Sir Cecil Barton (acting)

11th Governor of Trinidad and Tobago
- In office 17 September 1936 – 10 January 1938
- Monarchs: Edward VIII; George VI
- Preceded by: Sir Alfred Hollis
- Succeeded by: Sir Hubert Young

Personal details
- Born: Arthur George Murchison Fletcher; 27 September 1878
- Died: 9 April 1954 (aged 75)

Sir Arthur George Murchison Fletcher, KCMG, CBE (27 September 1878 – 9 April 1954) was a British colonial administrator.

== Career ==
He was Colonial Secretary of Ceylon from 1926 to 1929, during which time he was Acting Governor from 1927 to 1928. He was appointed Governor of Fiji and High Commissioner for the Western Pacific from 22 November 1929 to 28 November 1936, and Governor of Trinidad and Tobago from 1936 to 1938. His tenure coincided with the British West Indian labour unrest of 1934–39.

Murchison Fletcher is mentioned in several contemporary Trinidadian calypso songs, notably "The Governor's Resignation" and "Commission's Report" by Attila the Hun and "We Mourn the Loss of Sir Murchison Fletcher" by Lord Executor.

Government offices
Preceded by Hugh Clifford	Acting; Governor of British Ceylon; 1927-1928	Succeeded by Herbert Stanley
Preceded by Sir Eyre Hutson	High Commissioner for the Western Pacific; 1929–1936	Succeeded by Sir Arthur Richards
Preceded by Sir Eyre Hutson	Governor of Fiji; 1929–1936	Succeeded by Sir Arthur Richards
Preceded by Alfred Claud Hollis	Governor of Trinidad and Tobago; 1936–1938	Succeeded by Hubert Winthrop Young
