= William Des Vœux =

British colonial governor

Sir William Des Vœux GCMG
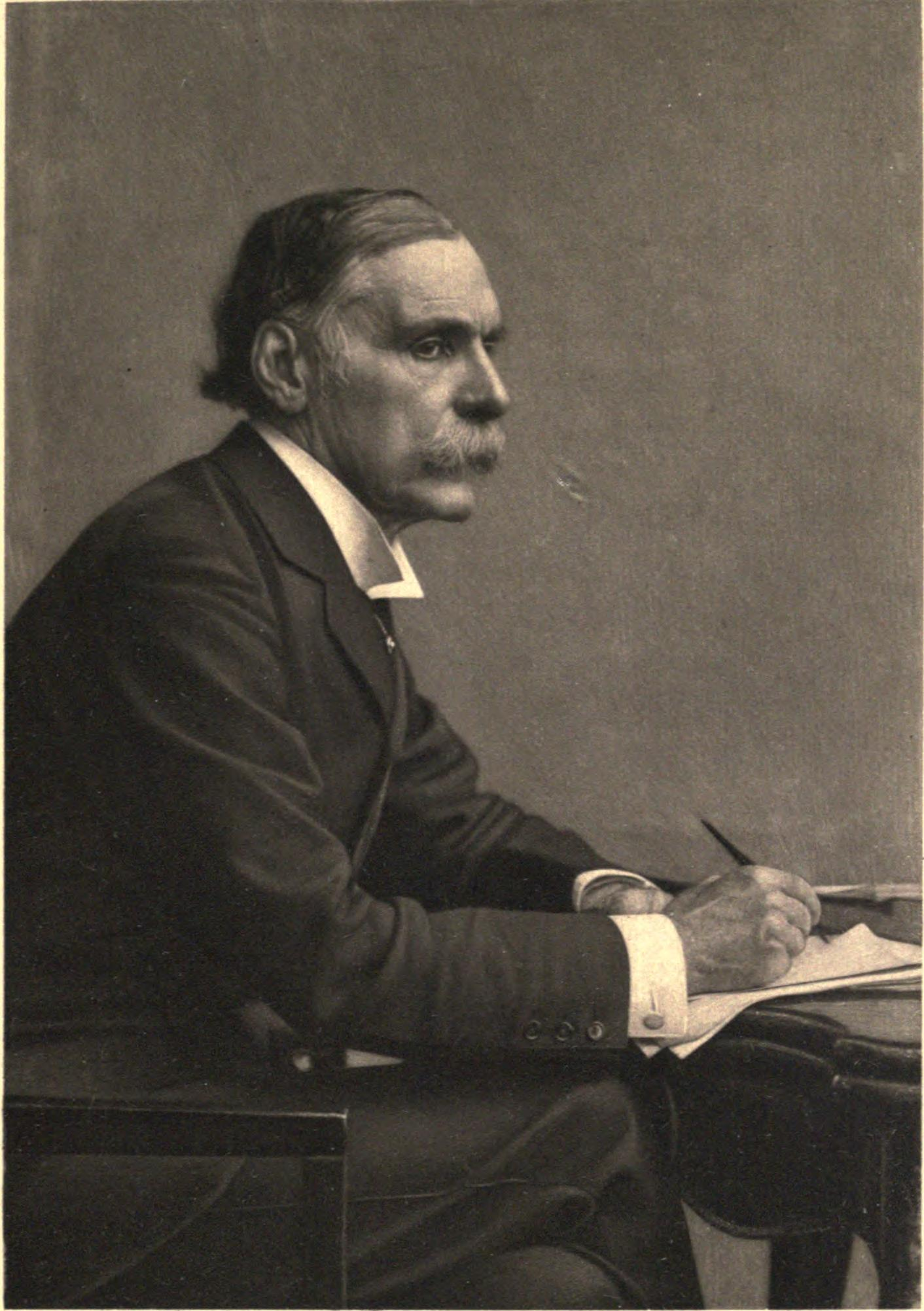

3rd Administrator of Saint Lucia
- In office January 1869 – December 1878
- Monarch: Victoria
- Preceded by: James Mayer Grant
- Succeeded by: Sir Arthur Havelock

2nd High Commissioner for the Western Pacific
- In office January 1880 – December 1886
- Monarch: Victoria
- Preceded by: Sir Arthur Hamilton Gordon
- Succeeded by: Sir Charles Bullen Hugh Mitchell

3rd Governor of Fiji
- In office January 1880 – December 1886
- Monarch: Victoria
- Preceded by: Sir Arthur Hamilton Gordon
- Succeeded by: Sir Charles Bullen Hugh Mitchell

54th Governor of Newfoundland
- In office 1886–1887
- Monarch: Victoria
- Prime Minister: Sir Robert Thorburn
- Preceded by: Sir John Hawley Glover
- Succeeded by: Sir Henry Arthur Blake

10th Governor of Hong Kong
- In office 6 October 1887 – 10 December 1891
- Monarch: Victoria
- Lieutenant: Sir William Cameron; Sir James Edwards; Sir George Barker
- Colonial Secretary: Frederick Stewart; Francis Fleming
- Preceded by: Sir George Bowen
- Succeeded by: Sir William Robinson

Personal details
- Born: George William Des Vœux; 22 September 1834 Baden-Baden, Grand Duchy of Baden, German Confederation
- Died: 15 December 1909 (aged 75) Brighton, England
- Spouse: Marion Pender (m. 1875)
- Children: 7
- Education: Balliol College, Oxford; University of Toronto (BA)

Chinese name
- Traditional Chinese: 德輔
- Simplified Chinese: 德辅
Transcriptions
Yue: Cantonese
- Jyutping: dak1 fu6

Viceregal styles of Sir William Des Vœux
- Reference style: His Excellency
- Spoken style: Your Excellency

Sir George William Des Vœux GCMG (22 September 1834 – 15 December 1909) was a British colonial administrator who served as governor of Fiji (1880–1885), Newfoundland (1886–1887), and Hong Kong (1887–1891).

== Early life ==
Des Vœux was born as the eighth of nine children of Reverend Henry Des Vœux and his second wife Fanny Elizabeth Hutton in Baden-Baden, Germany, on 22 September 1834. His grandfather was Irish politician Sir Charles des Voeux, 1st Baronet. His great-grandfather was a Huguenot from Normandy, France, who settled in Ireland in the early 18th century.

Des Vœux attended a public school in London before starting his studies at Charterhouse School (1845–1853) and Balliol College, Oxford (1854–1856), but left without a degree after his father gave him the choice of finishing his degree and becoming a clergyman or seeking his fortune in the colonies. Des Vœux then moved to Canada, where he finished his BA at the University of Toronto and became a barrister in Upper Canada in 1861.

== Colonial services ==
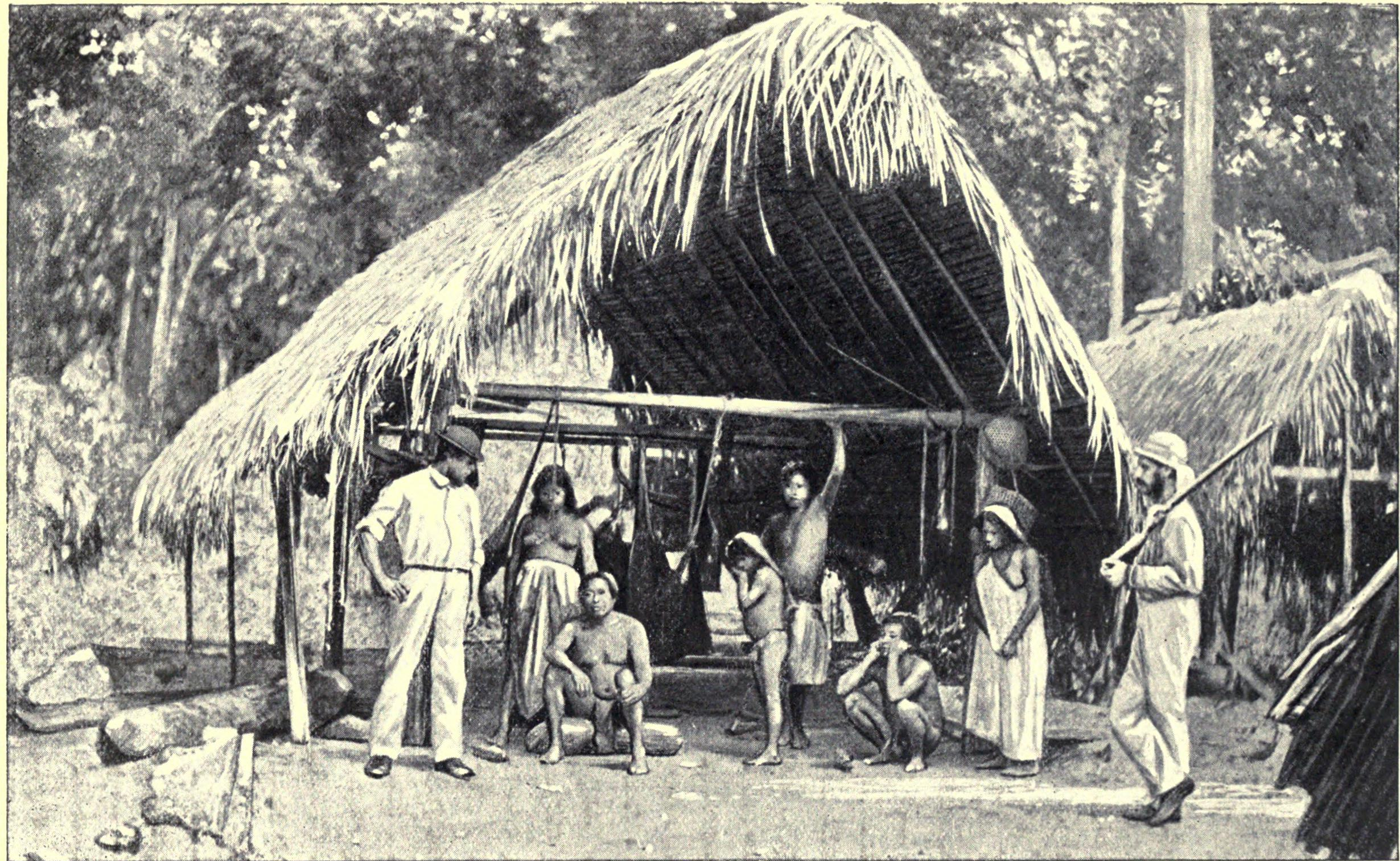
Des Vœux (far right) in Guiana

Des Vœux became stipendiary magistrate and superintendent of rivers and creeks in British Guiana from 1863 to 1869, where he championed native causes. First stipendiary magistrate in the East Bank Demerara district, he was later transferred to the Upper Demerara-Berbice region, he argued that this transfer was to limit his influence and power on decisions being made in the main city of the colony Georgetown. He was one of the leading figures (with Joseph Beaumont and James Crosby) against the Indian indenture system. Based on his experience in Guiana where he witnessed many instances of cruel and unjust treatment of indentured servants by plantation owners and managers, des Vœux wrote a 10,000-word report in 1869 to Lord Granville, the Secretary of State for the Colonies in which he detailed many abuses. When the contents of the report were published, there was a great outcry and the Commission of Inquiry into the Treatment of Immigrants was conducted. Des Vœux gave testimony before the commission in Georgetown and its report led to many improvements in the workers' treatment.

He reorganised and codified old French system of law when he was the Administrator and Colonial Secretary of St. Lucia between 1869 and 1880. Afterwards, Des Vœux was appointed Governor of Fiji and High Commissioner for the Western Pacific from 1880 to 1885. He was appointed Governor of Newfoundland from 1886 to 1887.

== Governor of Hong Kong ==
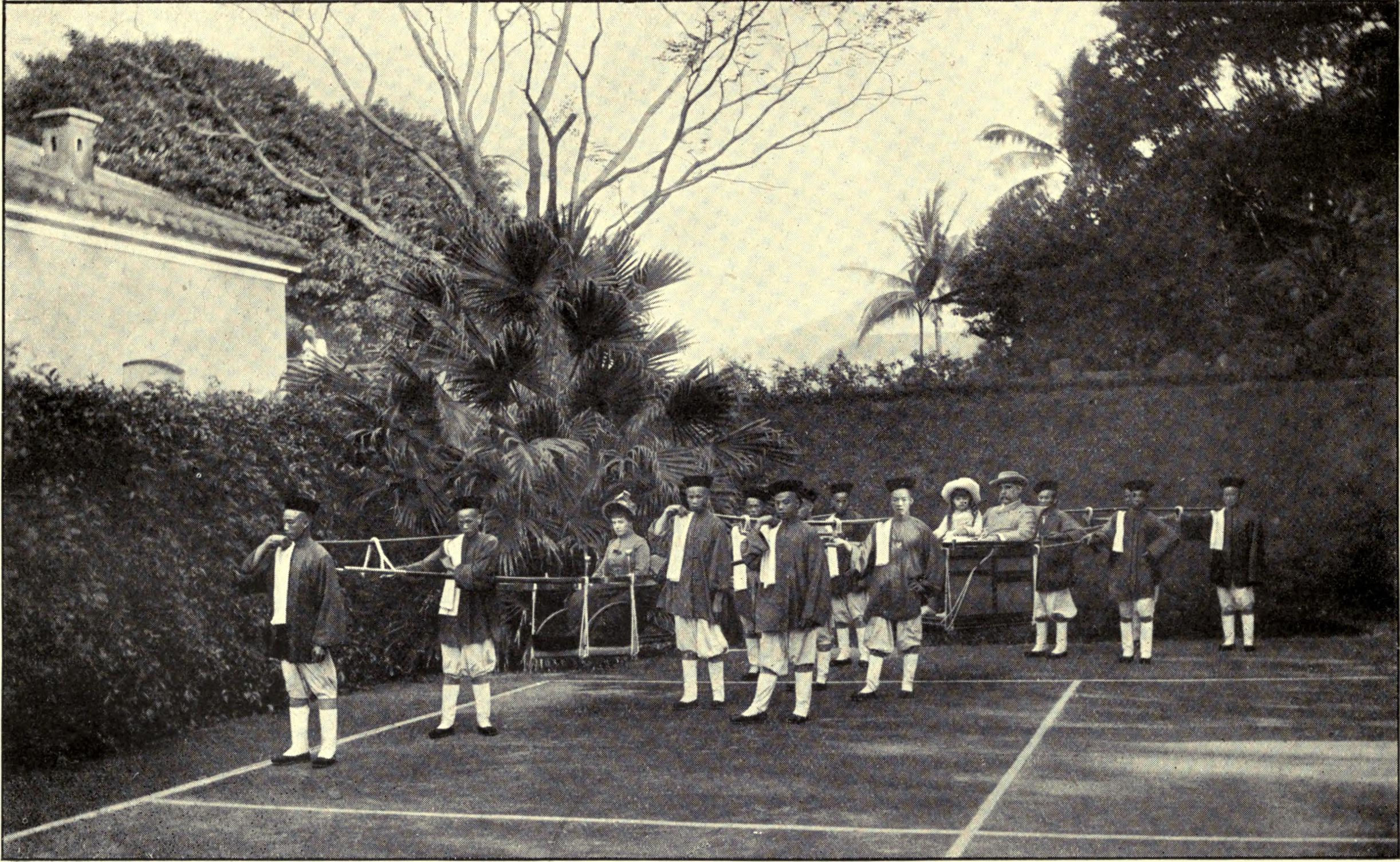
Des Vœux with his daughter on sedan chairs in Hong Kong

Des Vœux served as the tenth Governor of Hong Kong from 1887 to 1891. This was the last post he held in the Colonial Services. During his tenure the Peak Tram began operation in 1888, providing relatively affordable transportation for people living on The Peak. Des Vœux segregated the Peak together with effectively all the elevated areas of Hong Kong Island from crowded Chinese-style tenements by enacting the European District Reservation Ordinance in November of that year. A year before he left office, the newly established Hong Kong Electric Company began providing electricity to Hong Kong Island.

== Post-governorship ==
After Des Vœux's time as Governor of Hong Kong ended, he entered retirement. He was created a Knight Grand Cross of the Order of St Michael and St George in 1893. In 1903, he published his memoirs called My Colonial Service in British Guiana, St. Lucia, Trinidad, Fiji, Australia, Newfoundland, and Hong Kong with Interludes.

== Personal life ==
On 24 July 1875, Des Vœux married Marion Denison Pender, daughter of submarine telegraphy pioneer John Pender and Emma Denison. They had two daughters and five sons, three of whom died in infancy. Des Vœux died in Brighton, England, on 15 December 1909. William Des Vœux's son Henry John (1876-1940), married Dorothy Turner-Farley in 1911. Their son, Lt-Colonel Sir Richard, the eighth and last Des Vœux baronet, was killed in action at Arnhem in September 1944.

== Honours ==
- Companion of the Order of St Michael and St George, 1877
- Knight Commander of the Order of St Michael and St George, 1883
- Knight Grand Cross of the Order of St Michael and St George, 1893

== Namesakes ==
- Des Voeux Road, Hong Kong
- Des Voeux Peak, second highest peak on Taveuni Island, Fiji

== Sources ==
- Stephanie Williams, Running the Show: The Extraordinary Stories of the Men who Governed the British Empire, Viking 2011, ISBN 978-0670918041.

Government offices
Preceded by James Mayer Grant	Administrator of Saint Lucia; 1869–1878	Succeeded by Arthur Elibank Havelock
Preceded by Sir Arthur Hamilton Gordon	Governor of Fiji; 1880–1885	Succeeded by Sir Charles Bullen Hugh Mitchell
Preceded by Sir Arthur Hamilton Gordon	High Commissioner for the Western Pacific; 1880–1885	Succeeded by Sir Charles Bullen Hugh Mitchell
Preceded by Sir John Hawley Glover	Governor of Newfoundland; 1886–1887	Succeeded by Sir Henry Arthur Blake
Preceded by Major-General William Cameron as Acting Administrator	Governor of Hong Kong; 1887–1891	Succeeded by Major-General Digby Barker as Acting Administrator
