= John Skinner Wilson (rugby union) =

Scotland international rugby union player

John Wilson
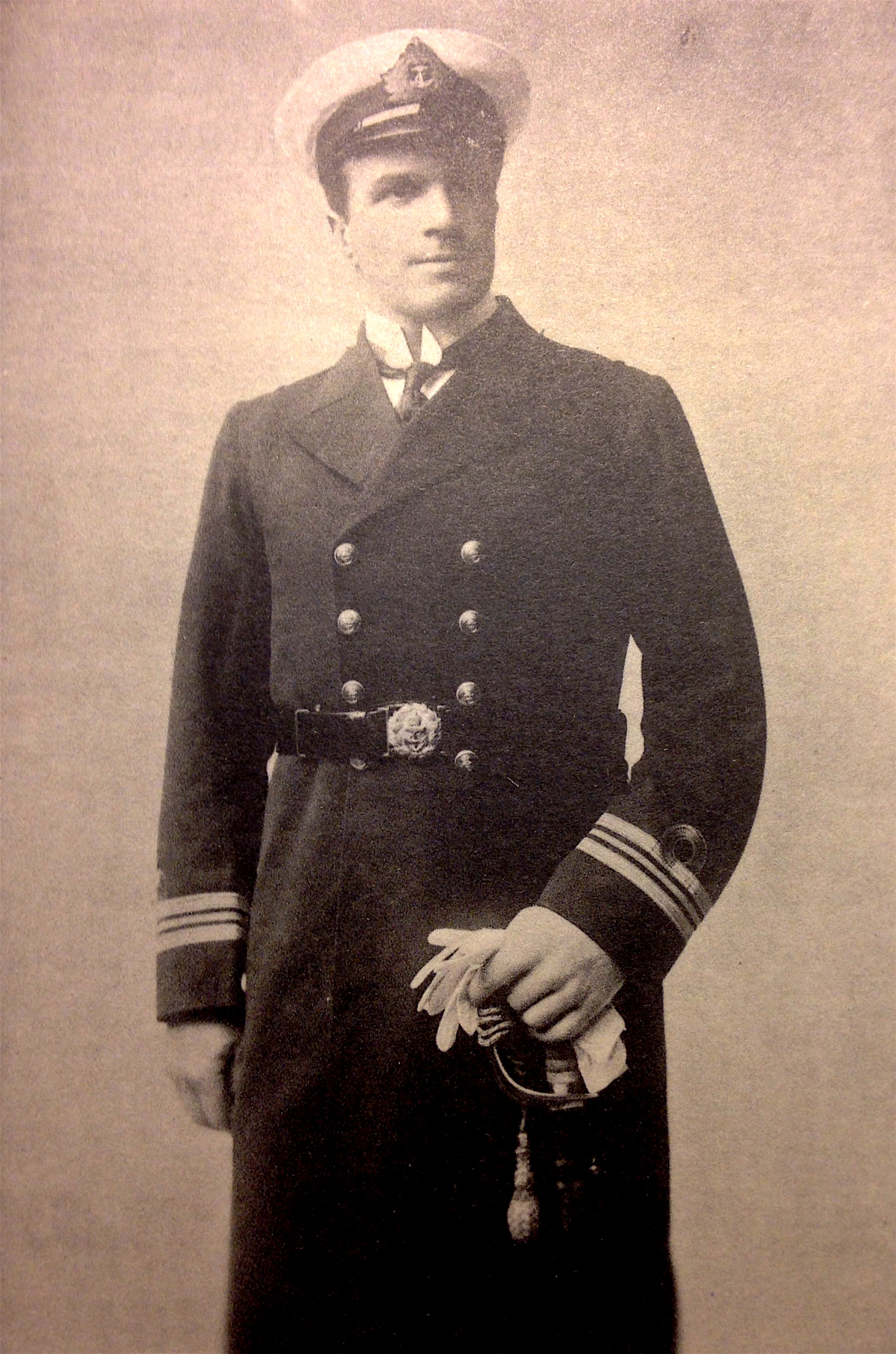
- Born: John Skinner Wilson; 10 March 1884 Trinidad
- Died: 31 May 1916 (aged 32) HMS Indefatigable, North Sea
- Height: 6 ft 0 in (183 cm)
- Weight: 12 st 0 lb (76 kg)

Rugby union career
- Position: Forward
Senior career
Years	Team	Apps	(Points)
–	United Services Portsmouth		
–	London Scottish FC		
International career
Years	Team	Apps	(Points)
1908–1909	Scotland	2	(0)
- Military career
- Allegiance: United Kingdom
- Branch: Royal Navy
- Rank: Lieutenant-Commander
- Commands: HMS Indefatigable
- Conflicts: First World War: Naval campaign; North Sea campaign; Battle of Jutland †

Lieutenant-Commander John Skinner Wilson (10 March 1884 – 31 May 1916) was a Trinidad-born rugby player, who represented Scotland, United Services RFC and London Scottish FC. He enrolled in the Royal Navy in 1898. He was killed in World War I in the Battle of Jutland, serving as Lieutenant-Commander aboard HMS Indefatigable. He is remembered on panel 10 at the Plymouth Naval Memorial.

== Early life ==
John Skinner Wilson was born on 10 March 1884 to Colonel Sir David Wilson KCMG and Nora Kate in Trinidad, where his father was superintendant of Crown Lands. From 1897 to 1904, his father was Governor and Commander in Chief of British Honduras. John had two brothers: the elder, Major Harry Stuart Wilson (born 1883), passed out of Sandhurst in 1902, and was killed in action on 9 September 1916 on the Western Front serving as Commanding Officer with the Royal Munster Fusiliers; his younger brother, Eric Ronald Wilson, survived the War as a captain in the Black Watch, and earned the Military Cross.

Wilson signed up as a navy officer cadet at Britannia Royal Naval College on 15 September 1898, and on 14 January 1900 was gazetted midshipman aboard HMS Canopus, on which he served for three years. On 12 July 1904, he was promoted to sub-lieutenant, with seniority backdated to 10 March 1903; and on 5 January 1905, to lieutenant, backdated to 10 March 1904. He served in the submarines for six months, before joining HMS King Edward VII, the flagship of Sir Arthur May. In 1906, he went to HMS Vernon, where he undertook specialist torpedo training, and in the years running up to the First World War, he served aboard HMS Talbot, HMS Formidable, HMS Superb, HMS Dreadnought, and finally, from 1913, HMS Indefatigable.

== Rugby career ==
Wilson was a forward with a reputation for keeping busy and remaining close to the action. He played for United Services RFC, and was captain of the team in 1908 and 1909, considered to be his best years of rugby, according to E. H. D. Sewell. It was in 1908 that he earned his first cap for Scotland, against Ireland, on 29 February 1908. He was selected a second time for Scotland, to play against Wales at Inverleith on 6 February 1909. Ahead of the game, the Welsh were 'quietly confident' of beating the home side. Wilson also played for the Navy against the Army 1907–1908 and again in 1913.

Off the rugby field, he was also an accomplished oarsman and sailor.

=== International appearances ===
Opposition	Score	Result	Date	Venue	Ref(s)
Ireland	16–11	Lost	29 February 1908	Lansdowne Road	
Wales	3–5	Lost	6 February 1909	Inverleith	

== First World War ==
Wilson served aboard HMS Indefatigable from 1913. On 31 May 1916, the ship was engaged in the Battle of Jutland, and blew up and sank after coming under fire from SMS von der Tann. Only two survivors were rescued by the German torpedo boat S.68.

Wilson is commemorated on the Plymouth Naval Memorial, and, alongside his brother Harry, on the Chandler's Ford War Memorial.

== See also ==
- List of international rugby union players killed in action during the First World War
