= Colonial Secretary of Bermuda =

This is a list of persons who have held the position of Colonial Secretary of Bermuda:

- 1808–1859: Robert Kennedy
- 1859–1875: Miles Gerald Keon
- 1875–1877: James Tucker
- 1877–1882: Randal (or Randall) Eden Webster
- 1882–1888: Charles Cavendish Boyle
- 1888–1900: [William] Archibald Alison
- 1900 (acting): Allan Frith Smith
- 1901–1908: Eyre Hutson
- 1908 (acting): Francis Goodwin Gosling
- 1908–1915: Reginald Popham Lobb (later Nicholson)
- 1915 (acting): Francis Goodwin Gosling
- 1916–1921: Wilfrid Edward Francis Jackson
- 1922–192?: Henry Monck-Mason Moore
- 1925–1929: Herbert Henniker-Heaton
- 1929–1932: Edward Walter Evans
- 1932–1935: Eubule John Waddington
- 1935–1938: Alexander William George Herder Grantham
- 1938–1942: Eric Aldhelm Torlogh Dutton
- 1942–1945: William Lindsay Murphy
- 1945–1950: William Addis
- 1951–1954: Oswald Raynor Arthur
- 1954–1956: Alan Geoffrey Tunstal Chaplin
- 1956–1968: Joseph Walter Sykes

== Chief Secretary of Bermuda ==
- 1968–1971: Joseph Walter Sykes

== See also ==
- Chief secretary (British Empire)
- Governor of Bermuda
