= Harry Luke =

British colonial administrator (1884–1969)

The Honourable Sir Harry Luke KCMG
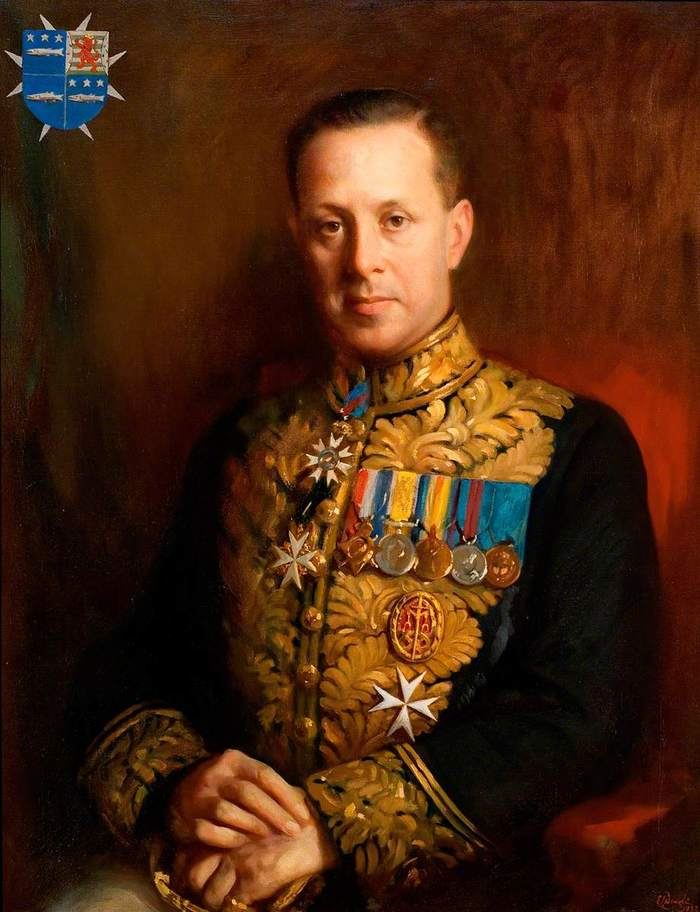
- 1932 portrait

Acting High Commissioner for Palestine
- In office 31 July 1928 – 6 December 1928
- Monarch: George V
- Preceded by: Herbert Onslow Plumer
- Succeeded by: John Chancellor

Governor of Fiji High Commissioner for the Western Pacific
- In office 16 September 1938 – 20 July 1942
- Monarch: George VI
- Preceded by: Arthur Richards
- Succeeded by: Philip Euen Mitchell

Personal details
- Born: Harry Charles Lukách; 4 December 1884 London, England
- Died: 11 May 1969 (aged 84) Cyprus
- Resting place: Conventual church of the Order of St John of Jerusalem in Clerkenwell, London
- Spouse: Joyce Evelyn Fremlin (m. 1918; div. 1949)
- Relations: Peter Luke (son)
- Children: 2 sons
- Education: Trinity College, Oxford
- Occupation: Naval officer, author, colonial administrator

Military service
- Battles/wars: World War I

Sir Harry Charles Luke KCMG (born Harry Charles Lukach; (Note: Anglicised spelling of the Hungarian (Lukács), from the personal name Lukács, Hungarian form of Lucas (English: Luke).) 4 December 1884 – 11 May 1969) was an official in the British Colonial Office. He served in Barbados, Cyprus, Transcaucasia, Sierra Leone, Palestine, Malta, and Fiji. He is the author of some books on several of these countries.

== Biography ==
Luke was born in London in 1884. His father, J. H. Luke (né Lukács), was an Austro-Hungarian, but later acquired American citizenship; his mother was a Polish Catholic of the minor nobility. Luke was educated at Eton College and at Trinity College, Oxford, of which he became an Honorary Fellow in 1952, and converted to Anglicanism.

Luke's first official appointment was as private secretary in Sierra Leone in 1908. He became aide-de-camp the following year, and briefly acted as Colonial Secretary for a few months. In 1911 he moved to Barbados to become private secretary to the Governor. He subsequently served as private secretary to the High Commissioner of Cyprus (1911–1912) and as commissioner of Famagusta (1918–1920). From 1909 to 1911 he was also a second lieutenant in the London Yeomanry.

During World War I, Luke served as Commander of the Royal Naval Volunteer Reserve on the Syrian Coast, and as a Political Officer on the staff of Admiral Sir Rosslyn Wemyss; for his services he was awarded the Italian Silver Medal of Military Valor.

In 1919 Luke was appointed Political Officer to the Admiral of the Fleet, Sir John de Robeck. In 1920 he spent six months (from April to September) as British Chief Commissioner in Transcaucasia (Georgia, Armenia, and Azerbaijan).

In 1921, he was assistant Governor of Jerusalem and was appointed a member of the Haycraft Commission, which was established by Sir Herbert Samuel to investigate the cause of the riot which started in Jaffa on 1 May that year, and into the affairs of the Orthodox Patriarchate of Jerusalem.

From 1924 to 1928 Luke held the post of Colonial Secretary of Sierra Leone. He was subsequently appointed to be the acting High Commissioner to the Government of Palestine. He assumed this position on 19 July 1928 and held it until 6 December 1928.

In August 1929, acting as deputy to Sir John Robert Chancellor, Luke attempted to mediate an agreement between Jewish and Arab leaders, without success. Later he was Lieutenant Governor of Malta (1930–1938) and Governor of Fiji and High Commissioner for the Western Pacific from 1938 to 1942. He left Fiji on 20 July 1942.

On his retirement from the Colonial Service in 1943, Luke served for three years as chief representative of the British Council in the Caribbean. He died in Cyprus, where he often spent the winter, on 11 May 1969.

A Freemason of the United Grand Lodge of England, in 1919–1920 he served as the 28th First Principal of the St. Paul's Royal Arch Chapter N. 2277 E. C. in Cyprus.

== Family ==
In 1918 Luke married Joyce Evelyn Fremlin, the daughter of Henry James Leigh Fremlin and his wife, Maud Evelyn Deane (divorced 1949). They had two sons, Peter Ambrose Cyprian Luke, born in 1919, and Michael Charles Deane Luke, born in 1925.

== Honours ==
- CMG (1926)
- Knight Batchelor (1933)
- Knight Commander of the Order of St Michael and St George (1939)
- Bailiff Grand Cross of the Order of St John (1960)

== Luke's published works ==
- The Fringe of the East. Journey through Past and Present Provinces of Turkey, (Macmillan & Co), 1913 (First published under the name Harry Charles Lukach)
- The City of the Dancing Dervishes, 1914
- Cypriote Shrines, (Faith Press), 1920
- The Handbook of Cyprus (London), 1920 (together with D.J. Jardine)
- Cyprus under the Turks 1571–1878, (Oxford University Press), 1921
- Report of the commission appointed by the government of Palestine to inquire into the affairs of the orthodox patriarchate of Jerusalem, 1921 (together with Anton Bertram)
- The handbook of Palestine, 1922 (together with Edward Keith Roach)
- Anatolica, (London), 1924
- Mosul and its minorities, 1925
- Prophets, Priests and Patriarchs: sketches of the sects of Palestine and Syria, 1927
- In the Margin of History, 1933
- An Eastern Checkerboard, 1934
- More Moves on an Eastern Checkerboard, 1935
- The Making of Modern Turkey, (Macmillan & Co), 1936
- The British Pacific islands, 1944
- From a South Seas Diary, 1938–1942, 1945
- "Aden", in: The British Empire, by Hector Bolitho, 1948.
- Malta, an account and an appreciation, 1949
- Caribbean Circuit, 1950
- Aegean, Cyprus, Turkey, Transcaucasia and Palestine (1914–1924), 1953
- Cities and Men: an autobiography – Vols. 1 & 2, 1953
- Queen Salote and her Kingdom, 1954
- The Tenth Muse: A Gourmet's Compendium, 1954 (a cookery book)
- The Old Turkey and the New: from Byzantium to Ankara, 1955 (First published in 1936 under the title The Making of Modern Turkey)
- Cities and Men: an autobiography, Vol. 3, 1956
- Cyprus: a Portrait and an Appreciation, (Harrap), 1957

Government offices
Preceded by Herbert Onslow Plumer	High Commissioner of Palestine (acting); 1928	Succeeded by John Robert Chancellor
Preceded by Arthur Frederick Richards	High Commissioner for the Western Pacific; 1938–1942	Vacant Title next held by Alexander Grantham
Preceded by Arthur Frederick Richards	Governor of Fiji; 1938–1942	Succeeded by Philip Euen Mitchell

== See also ==
- List of governors of Fiji
- Mandate for Palestine

== Sources ==
- Holland, Robert (September 2004). "Luke, Sir Harry Charles (1884–1969)". Oxford Dictionary of National Biography (online ed.). Oxford University Press. doi:10.1093/ref:odnb/34629. (Subscription, Wikipedia Library access or UK public library membership required.)
