= John Nicoll (colonial administrator) =

British colonial administrator

Sir John Nicoll KCMG KStJ
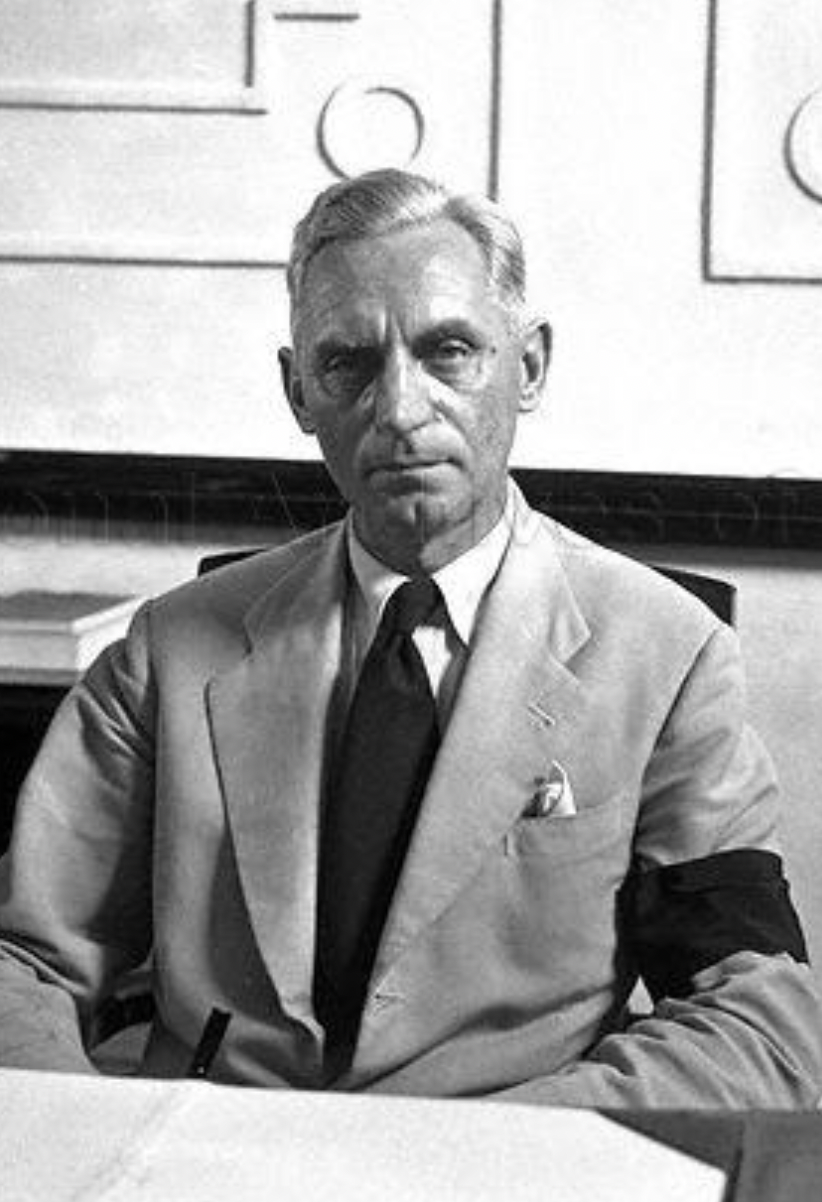
- Nicoll in 1952

2nd Governor of Singapore
- In office 21 April 1952 – 2 June 1955
- Monarch: Elizabeth II
- Chief Minister: David Marshall
- Preceded by: Franklin Gimson; Wilfred Lawson Blythe (acting)
- Succeeded by: William Goode (acting); Robin Black

18th Colonial Secretary of Hong Kong
- In office 25 May 1949 – 23 January 1952
- Monarchs: George VI; Elizabeth II
- Preceded by: David Mercer MacDougall
- Succeeded by: Robin Black

Acting High Commissioner for the Western Pacific
- In office 21 March 1947 – 8 October 1947
- Monarch: George VI
- Preceded by: Alexander Grantham
- Succeeded by: Brian Freeston

Acting Governor of Fiji
- In office 4 May 1944 – 23 October 1944
- Monarch: George VI
- Preceded by: John Rankine (acting)
- Succeeded by: John Rankine (acting)

Personal details
- Born: John Fearns Nicoll; 26 April 1899
- Died: 12 January 1981 (aged 81) Wimbledon Common, London, England
- Spouse(s): Irene, Lady Nicoll (m. 1939)
- Children: 1
- Education: Pembroke College, Oxford
- Occupation: Colonial administrator

Sir John Fearns Nicoll KCMG KStJ (26 April 1899 – 12 January 1981) was a British colonial administrator who served as Governor of Singapore from 1952 to 1955.

== Early years and colonial service ==
Nicoll was born in 1899 and attended Carlisle Grammar School, Pembroke College, Oxford and University of Oxford and embarked on a colonial career in British Protectorate of North Borneo in 1921.

Nicoll became Deputy Colonial Secretary of the British Crown Colony Trinidad and Tobago in 1937, the Colonial Secretary of the British Colony of Fiji from 1944 to 1949. During this time, he served as Acting Governor twice, in 1944 and 1947. This was followed by his appointment as administrator and Colonial Secretary of Hong Kong in 1949.

Nicoll became Governor of Singapore in 1952 and was present during the 1954 National Service riots. After the Hock Lee bus riots in May 1955, Nicoll retired from the Governorship and Colonial Service in June. He returned to Britain.

== Awards and honours ==
Nicoll was invested as Companion of the Order of St Michael and St George (CMG) in the 1946 New Year Honours and was promoted to Knight Commander of the Order of St Michael and St George (KCMG) in 1953 New Year Honours.

He was knighted with Order of the Hospital of Saint John of Jerusalem (KStJ) in 1952.

== Personal ==
Nicoll and his wife, Irene, had one son, Anthony Nicoll.

Nicoll died on 12 January 1981 at Scio House Hospital, Putney Heath, London, United Kingdom.

== Legacy ==
Nicoll Highway was named in his honour and a portrait of Nicoll by Elliott & Fry hangs in the National Portrait Gallery.

Government offices
Preceded by Sir John Rankine (Acting)	Acting Governor of Fiji; 1944	Succeeded by Sir John Rankine (Acting)
Preceded by Sir Alexander Grantham (Acting)	Acting Governor of Fiji; 1947	Succeeded by Sir Brian Freeston (Acting)
Preceded by David Mercer MacDougall	Colonial Secretary of Hong Kong; 1949-1952	Succeeded by Sir Robert Black
Preceded by Franklin Gimson; Wilfred Lawson Blythe (Acting)	Governor of Singapore; 1952-1955	Succeeded by Sir William Goode (Acting); Sir Robert Black
