= David Wilson (governor) =

British colonial administrator and military officer (1832-1924)

Colonel Sir David Wilson, KCMG VD (1832 – 15 March 1924) was a British colonial administrator and military officer.

David Wilson was the son of the Very Rev. Dean Wilson, of Fyvie, Aberdeen. He was Private Secretary to Sir Arthur Hamilton-Gordon, Lieutenant-Governor of New Brunswick and Governor of Trinidad from 1861 to 1869, a Stipendiary Magistrate in Trinidad from 1870 to 1878, Commissioner of Northern Province and Sub-Intendant of Crown Lands, Trinidad from 1878 to 1897, and was Acting Colonial Secretary of Trinidad on several occasions between 1875 and 1896; He was finally Governor of British Honduras from 1897 to 1903.

Wilson became a Captain in the New Brunswick Volunteer Militia in 1863, a Major in the St John Volunteer Battalion on frontier service in 1866, receiving the Canada General Service Medal with one clasp. He was subsequently Officer commanding Trinidad Volunteer Force from 1879 to 1890, and Colonel commanding Light Infantry Volunteers from 1890 to 1897. He was Honorary Colonel, Trinidad Light Infantry Volunteers, and was a recipient of the Volunteer Officers' Decoration for India and the Colonies.

Wilson was appointed a CMG in 1890 and promoted KCMG in 1899.

Wilson married firstly in 1870 Jane (died 1874), daughter of the late Alexander Milne. He married secondly in 1881 Nora, daughter of Norval Clyne, of Aberdeen; they had two (or three) sons and two daughters. The rugby player and Royal Navy officer John Skinner Wilson was his son.
