= James Edwards (British Army officer) =

British Army officer and politician

Lieutenant-General Sir James Edwards KCB KCMG
- Lieutenant-General Sir James Edwards, c. 1895
- Born: 5 November 1834
- Died: 8 July 1922 (aged 87); London, England
- Burial place: Brompton Cemetery, London
- Military career
- Allegiance: United Kingdom
- Branch: British Army
- Service years: 1852–1893
- Rank: Lieutenant-General
- Commands: Commander of British Troops in China and Hong Kong; Royal School of Military Engineering
- Conflicts: Crimean War; Indian Mutiny; Mahdist War
- Awards: Knight Commander of the Order of the Bath; Knight Commander of the Order of St Michael and St George; Mentioned in Despatches

Lieutenant-General Sir James Bevan Edwards, KCB, KCMG (5 November 1834 – 8 July 1922) was a senior British Army officer and politician.

== Military career ==
Edwards was commissioned into the Royal Engineers in 1852. He served with the Royal Engineers in the Crimean War in 1853 and the Indian Mutiny of 1857.

He transferred to the Indian Staff Corps in 1882, and, during the Mahdist War, became Commanding Royal Engineer for the Suakin Expeditionary Force in 1885. He was mentioned in despatches for his role in this Expedition.

On return to the United Kingdom, Edwards became Commandant of the Royal School of Military Engineering. He was then appointed Commander of British Troops in China and Hong Kong in 1889.

Edwards was also selected by the British Government to inspect the forces of the Australian colonies in 1889 and to advise on their organisation. He recommended a structure to enable the colonies to combine for mutual defence, uniform organisation and armament, a common Defence Act, a military college to train officers and a uniform gauge for railways.

At the 1895 general election, he was elected to the House of Commons as Member of Parliament (MP) for Hythe in Kent, but he made his resignation from the British House of Commons in February 1899.

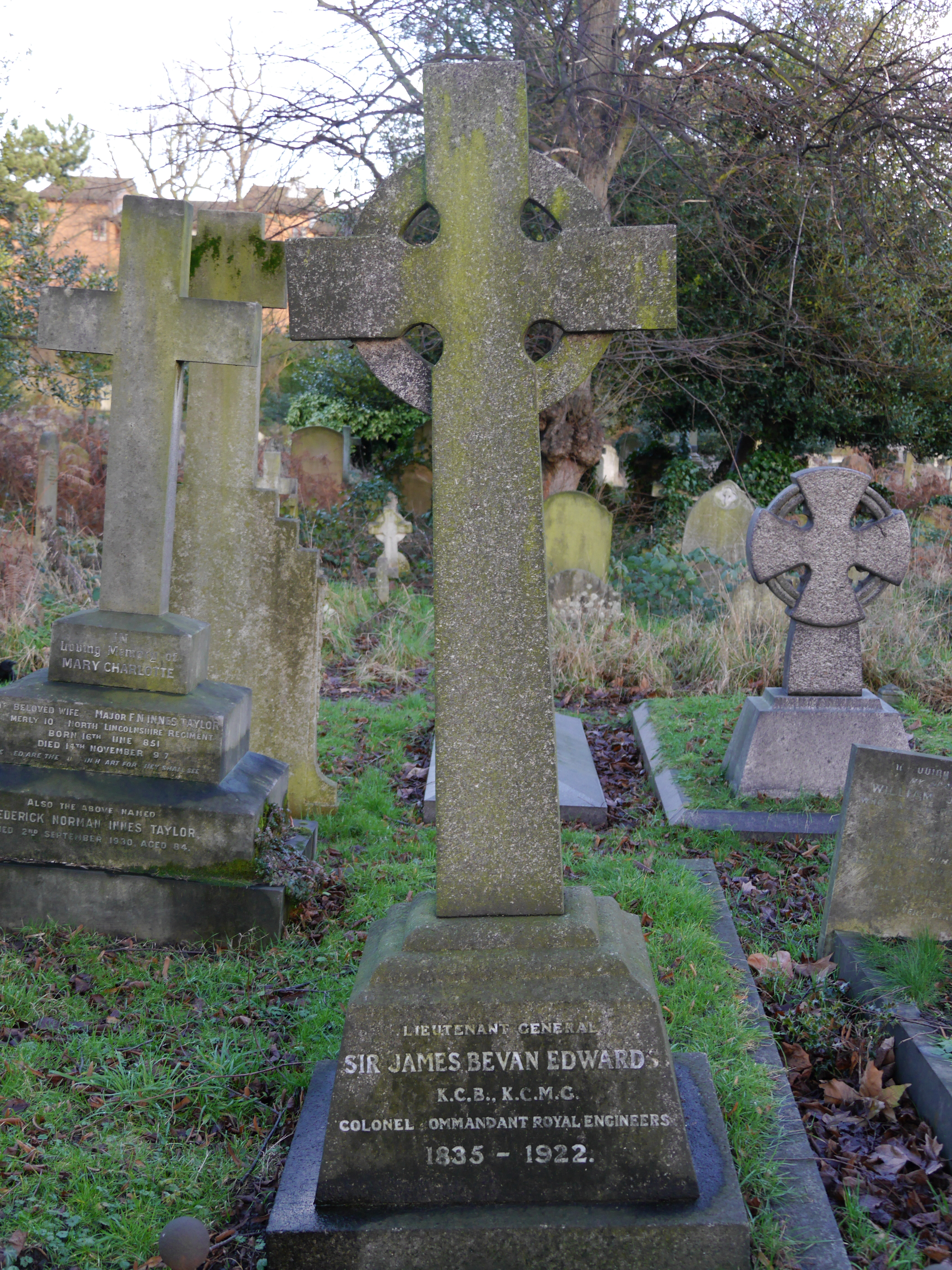
Funerary monument, Brompton Cemetery, London

He became colonel-commandant of the Royal Engineers in 1903.

Edwards died in 1922 and is buried in Brompton Cemetery, London.

== Family ==
Edwards married three times: in 1868 to Alice Brocklebank, daughter of Ralph Brocklebank; in 1901 to Nina Balfour, daughter of John Balfour; and, in 1918, Amy Ann Harding. He had several children, including:

- Isabel Sybil Edwards (died 1956), who married in 1902 Colonel Edward Charles Walthall Delves Walthall, CMG, DSO, (1874–1961), an officer in the Royal Artillery.

Military offices
Preceded by Sir William Cameron	Commander of British Troops in China and Hong Kong; 1889–1890	Succeeded by Sir George Barker
Parliament of the United Kingdom
Preceded by Edward Watkin	Member of Parliament for Hythe; 1895–1899	Succeeded by Sir Edward Sassoon
