= Alec Newboult =

British colonial administrator

Sir Alexander Theodore Newboult, KBE, CMG, MC, ED (3 January 1896 – 5 January 1964) was a British colonial administrator. He was Chief Secretary of the Federation of Malaya from 1946 to 1950. During that period, he was Officer Administering the Government of Malaya from July to October 1948 after the death of Sir Edward Gent.

Newboult was the elder son of the Rev. A. W. Newboult. His younger brother was the mathematician Harold Oliver Newboult. He was educated at Oakwood School and Kingswood School and Exeter College, Oxford. During the First World War, he served with the Royal Naval Division and the Duke of Cornwall's Light Infantry, being awarded the Military Cross in 1918. He then joined the Colonial Administrative Service, beginning his service in Malaya in 1920. He went to Fiji as Colonial Secretary in 1942, after the Japanese invasion of Malaya, and remained in the colony until his return in Malaya. He retired from the service in 1950.
