= Brian Freeston =

British colonial official

Sir Brian Freeston KCMG OBE

Governor of the Leeward Islands
- In office 1943–1947
- Monarch: George VI
- Preceded by: Sir Douglas Jardine
- Succeeded by: W. R. Macnie (Acting)

16th High Commissioner for the Western Pacific
- In office 1945 – 21 March 1947
- Monarch: George VI
- Preceded by: Sir John Rankine (Acting)
- Succeeded by: John Fearns Nicoll (Acting)

18th Governor of Fiji
- In office 8 October 1947 – 6 October 1952
- Monarch: George VI
- Preceded by: Sir John Rankine (Acting)
- Succeeded by: John Fearns Nicoll (Acting)

2nd Secretary General of the Pacific Commission
- In office 12 November 1951 – 12 November 1954
- Preceded by: William D. Forsyth
- Succeeded by: Ralph Clairon Bedell

Personal details
- Born: Leslie Brian Freeston; 11 August 1892 Brentford, Middlesex, England
- Died: 16 July 1958 (aged 65) Bromley, Kent, England

Military service
- Years of service: 1914–1919
- Rank: Captain
- Unit: London Regiment

Sir Leslie Brian Freeston KCMG OBE (11 August 1892 – 16 July 1958) was a British colonial official.

== Career ==
Freeston was educated at Willaston School and New College, Oxford. After service in the London Regiment of the British Army in the First World War he joined the then Colonial Office in 1919. He was Governor of the Leeward Islands 1944–48; Governor of Fiji and High Commissioner for the Western Pacific 1948–52; Secretary-General of the South Pacific Commission 1951–54. Freeston was knighted on 1 January 1945.

== Sources ==
- FREESTON, Sir (Leslie) Brian, Who Was Who, A & C Black, 1920–2015 (online edition, Oxford University Press, 2014)
- Sir Brian Freeston – Former Governor Of Fiji (obituary), The Times, London, 17 July 1958, page 12
