= 2000 Birthday Honours =

British government recognitions

The Queen's Birthday Honours were announced on 19 June 2000 to celebrate the Queen's Official Birthday in the United Kingdom, Australia (12 June), New Zealand (13 June), Barbados, The Bahamas, Grenada, Papua New Guinea, Tuvalu, Saint Lucia, and Belize,

The recipients of honours are displayed or referred to as they were styled before their new honour and arranged first by country, honour and where appropriate by rank (Knight Grand Cross, Knight Commander etc.) then division (Military, Civil, Overseas or Police list).

== United Kingdom ==
=== Knight Bachelor ===
- Professor Anthony Barnes Atkinson, Warden, Nuffield College, University of Oxford. For services to Economics.
- David Rowat Barclay. For charitable services.
- Frederick Hugh Barclay. For charitable services.
- David Sydney Rowe-Beddoe, Chairman, Welsh Development Agency. For services to Industrial and Economic Development in Wales.
- Ian Charles Rayner Byatt, Director General of Water Services. For services to Water Consumers and to the Water Industry.
- Michael Caine, C.B.E., Actor. For services to Drama.
- William Martin Castell, Chief Executive, Nycomed Amersham plc. For services to the Life Sciences Industry.
- Iain Geoffrey Chalmers. For services to health care.
- Howard John Davies, Chairman, Financial Services Authority. For services to Financial Regulation.
- Stuart Anthony Lipton, Chief Executive, Stanhope. For services to the Property Industry and to the Environment.
- Murdo Maclean, Private Secretary to the Chief Whip, Chief Whip's Office, 12 Downing Street.
- Professor Roderick Norman McIver MacSween, lately President, Royal College of Pathologists and Chairman, Academy of Medical Royal Colleges. For services to Medicine and to Pathology.
- Neil William David McIntosh, C.B.E., Chairman, Scottish Council for Voluntary Organisations. For services to the community.
- Graham Morgan, Executive Director of Nursing and Quality, North West London Hospitals NHS Trust. For services to Health Care.
- Professor Howard Joseph Newby, C.B.E., Vice-Chancellor, University of Southampton. For services to Higher Education.
- John David Phillips, Q.P.M., Chief Constable, Kent County Constabulary. For services to Police.
- Professor George Karoly Radda, C.B.E., F.R.S., Chief Executive, Medical Research Council. For services to Biomedical Science.
- Professor John Shipley Rowlinson, F.R.S. For services to Chemistry, Chemical Engineering and to Education.
- Paul Brierley Smith, C.B.E., Designer. For services to the Fashion Industry.
- George Sweeney, Principal, Knowsley Community College. For services to Further Education.
- Robert Andrew Wales, Leader, London Borough of Newham. For services to Local Government.
- John Anthony Wall, C.B.E., Chairman, Royal National Institute for the Blind. For services to Disabled People.
- Professor Adrian Leonard Webb, Vice-Chancellor, University of Glamorgan. For services to Higher Education.
- Alan Charles Laurence Whistler, C.B.E., Glass engraver, poet and writer. For services to Art.
- Nicholas Charles Young, Chief Executive, Macmillan Cancer Relief. For services to Cancer Care.
- Bernard Schreier. For services to the development of UK-Hungary trade.

=== Order of the Bath ===
==== Knight Commander of the Order of the Bath (KCB) ====
- Lieutenant General Christopher Francis Drewry, C.B.E., late Welsh Guards.
- Air Marshal Timothy Ivo Jenner, C.B., Royal Air Force.
- Stephen James Lander, C.B., Director-General, Security Service.
- John Laughlin Semple, C.B., Head, Northern Ireland Civil Service.

==== Companion of the Order of the Bath (CB) ====
Military Division

- Local Vice Admiral John Henry Stuart McAnally, L.V.O.
- Rear Admiral Robert Patrick Stevens.
- Major General John Milne, late Royal Regiment of Artillery.
- Major General Gordon Risius, late Adjutant General's Corps (Army Legal Services).
- Major General Philip Charles Cornwallis Trousdell, late The Royal Irish Regiment.
- Air Vice-Marshal Ian Brackenbury, O.B.E., Royal Air Force.
- Air Vice-Marshal Ian Michael Stewart, A.F.C., Royal Air Force.
- Air Vice-Marshal Graham Eric Stirrup, A.F.C., Royal Air Force.

Civil Division

- Harry John Bush, Deputy Director, Financial Regulation and Industry, H.M. Treasury.
- David Randall Coates, Chief Economic Adviser and Head, Economics Profession, Department of Trade and Industry.
- Michael Barclay Gahagan, Director, Housing Directorate, Department of the Environment, Transport and the Regions.
- Robert Smith Benzie Gordon, Head, Executive Secretariat, Scottish Executive.
- Paul Richard Charles Gray, Group Director, Department of Social Security.
- Barrie Rowland Ireton, Director-General, Resources, Department for International Development.
- Michael Alan Johns, Chief Executive, Valuation Office Agency and Commissioner of Inland Revenue, H.M. Board of Inland Revenue.
- Dr Keith Owen Mead, Director of Technology and Engineering, GCHQ.
- Peter Alan Shaw, Director General, Finance and Analytical Services, Department for Education and Employment.
- Hugh Taylor, Director of Human Resources, NHS Executive, Department of Health.
- Janet, Mrs Thompson, Chief Executive, Forensic Science Service, Home Office.

=== Order of St Michael and St George ===
==== Knight Commander of the Order of St Michael and St George (KCMG) ====
- Anthony Arthur Duncan Montague Browne, C.B.E., D.F.C. For long and distinguished public service.
- Stephen John Gomersall, C.M.G., H.M. Ambassador, Tokyo.
- Ivor Anthony Roberts, C.M.G., H.M. Ambassador, Dublin.
- Mark Moody-Stuart, Group Managing Director, Royal Dutch Shell Group.

==== Companion of the Order of St Michael and St George (CMG) ====
- Anthony John Cragg, lately Assistant Secretary General, Defence Planning and Operations, NATO.
- Timothy John Garton Ash, For services to the promotion of democracy in Central and Eastern Europe.
- Professor Michael Arthur Branch, Director, School of Slavonic and East European Studies.
- David Thomas Handley, Counsellor, Foreign and Commonwealth Office.
- Malcolm Charles Harper, Director-General, UN Association.
- John Philip Kelly, L.V.O., M.B.E., lately Governor, Turks and Caicos Islands.
- The Right Reverend Walter Paul Khotso Makhulu, Archbishop of Central Africa.
- David Byron Merry, Deputy British High Commissioner, Karachi.
- David Bernard, Viscount Montgomery of Alamein, C.B.E. For services to UK-Latin American relations.
- John Anthony Penney, lately Deputy Head of Mission, Brasilia.
- Roy Gregory Reynolds. For services to the Commonwealth Development Corporation.
- David Frederick Charles Ridgway, O.B.E., H.M. Ambassador, Havana.
- The Honourable Emma Georgina Rothschild. For services to Britain's international cultural and academic relations.
- David Roger Thomas, H.M. Ambassador, Baku.
- David John Woodward, UK Director of Audit Operations, United Nations Headquarters, New York.

=== Royal Victorian Order ===
==== Knight Commander of the Royal Victorian Order (KCVO) ====
- Michael Kershaw Ridley, C.V.O., Clerk of the Council, Duchy of Lancaster.

==== Commander of the Royal Victorian Order (CVO) ====
- Simon Dallas Cairns, The Earl Cairns, C.B.E., Receiver-General of the Duchy of Cornwall.
- Kevin John Selwyn Knott, L.V.O., Deputy Secretary of the Duchy of Cornwall and Deputy Treasurer to The Prince of Wales.
- John Edward Pugsley, Member of The Prince's Council.
- Graham Reynolds. For services to the Royal Collection.
- Richard John Boileau Walker. For services to the Royal Collection.
- Robin Wight, Chairman, The Duke of Edinburgh's Award, Charter for Business.

Honorary Commander

- Harold Edward (Harry) Fitzgibbons, Chairman of Trustees, The Prince of Wales's Innovation Trust.

==== Lieutenant of the Royal Victorian Order (LVO) ====
- Gerald William Priestman Barber, Joint Headmaster of Ludgrove School.
- Barrie England, lately Deputy Head of Protocol Division, Foreign and Commonwealth Office.
- George Albert Griffiths, M.V.O., Fire, Health and Safety Manager, Royal Household.
- Charles Nicholas John Marston, Joint Headmaster of Ludgrove School.
- Lieutenant Colonel Richard Mayfield, D.S.O., The Queen's Body Guard of the Yeomen of the Guard.
- Robert Fraser Newell, Director-General, Royal Over-Seas League.
- Michael Trevor Parker, M.V.O., Assistant to the Master of the Household 'G', Royal Household.
- Richard John Popplewell, M.V.O., Organist, Choirmaster and Composer, Her Majesty's Chapels Royal.
- Margaret, The Honourable Mrs Rhodes, Lady in Waiting to Queen Elizabeth The Queen Mother.
- Major Robert Philip Rising, Royal Marines, Secretary, Royal Yacht Squadron.
- Richard Martin Sands, lately Honours Secretary, Foreign and Commonwealth Office.
- Miss Penelope Russell-Smith, Deputy Press Secretary to The Queen.

==== Member of the Royal Victorian Order (MVO) ====
- Robert Bruce Collins, Deputy Clerk of the Lieutenancy, Leicestershire.
- Miss Sybil Alexandra Grant, B.E.M., Personal Secretary to the General Officer Commanding London District and the Household Division.
- Inspector David Stephen Hall, Royalty Protection Department, Metropolitan Police.
- Superintendent Roger Derek Kingsmill, Royalty Protection Department, Metropolitan Police.
- Miss Patricia Ann Lloyd, Personnel Officer, Royal Household.
- Major Ian Gordon Manning, lately Honorary Secretary, Grand Military Race Committee.
- Roy Alan Smith, Deputy Keeper of the Records, Duchy of Lancaster.
- Norman Thain, Clerk of Works, Balmoral Estate.
- Gerard Anthony Wheeldon, Royal Estates Branch, Department for Culture, Media and Sport.
- Wing Commander James Edward Sissmore Wilson, lately Accountant to The Princess Margaret, Countess of Snowdon.

==== Royal Victorian Medal (Silver) (RVM) ====
- Ivan Richard Boggis, Tractor Driver, Sandringham Estate.
- Anthony Gerald Brent, Storekeeper and Messenger, Windsor Castle.
- Leslie Champion, lately Fire Surveillance Officer, Buckingham Palace.
- Terence Clifford, lately Senior Fire Precautions Officer, Buckingham Palace.
- Constable Desmond Joseph D’Arcy, Royalty Protection Department, Metropolitan Police.
- John Gilbert Emery, Livery Porter, Windsor Castle.
- Hazel Ann, Mrs Esson, Head Housemaid, Balmoral Castle.
- Leighton Daniel Fice, Divisional Sergeant Major, The Queen's Body Guard of the Yeomen of the Guard.
- Mark Fromont, Sous Chef, Royal Household.
- Sheila, Mrs Henderson, lately Senior Sales Assistant, Palace of Holyroodhouse.
- David Allen Ives, Woodman, Crown Estate, Windsor.
- William Verron Jackson, lately Groundsman, Ascot Racecourse.
- Barrie Lister, lately Assistant Manager, The Royal Studs.
- Edward Peter Mills, Leading Polisher, Royal Household.
- Henry Thomas Phillips, Assistant to the Crown Jeweller.
- Olga Joyce, Mrs Powell. For services to The Prince of Wales.
- Frederick Alan Young, Craftsman Welder, Crown Estate, Windsor.

=== Order of the British Empire ===
==== Knight Grand Cross of the Order of the British Empire (GBE) ====
- The Right Honourable Edward Alan John George, Governor, Bank of England. For services to the Economy.

==== Dame Commander of the Order of the British Empire (DBE) ====
- Ms Beryl Bainbridge, Author. For services to Literature.
- Vivien Louise, Mrs Duffield, C.B.E. For services to the Arts.
- Miss Anne Elizabeth Jane Evans, Opera Singer. For services to music.
- Madelaine Glynne Dervel Evans, C.M.G., lately H.M. Ambassador, Santiago.
- Miss Geraldine Mary Marcella Keegan, O.B.E. For services to Secondary Education.
- Judith Ann Gladys, Mrs Kilpatrick, Headteacher, City of Portsmouth Girls' School, Portsmouth. For services to Education.
- Miss Mary Elizabeth Peters, C.B.E. For services to Sport and to the community in Northern Ireland.

==== Knight Commander of the Order of the British Empire (KBE) ====
- Vice Admiral James Francis Perowne, O.B.E.
- The Right Honourable Jeremy John Durham (Paddy) Ashdown, M.P. For political and public service.
- Ka-shing Li, C.B.E. For services to British industry and to medical research.
- Antony Sher, KBE. For services in art.

==== Commander of the Order of the British Empire (CBE) ====
Military division:

- Commodore Richard John Lord, Royal Navy.
- Colonel Alexander Malcolm Mason, OBE, Royal Marines.
- Commodore Neill Wynell Thomas, DSC, Royal Navy.
- Group Captain Robert William Joseph, Royal Air Force.
- Air Commodore Iain Walter McNicoll, Royal Air Force.

Civil division:

- John Martin Abbott, QPM. Director-General, National Criminal Intelligence Service. For services to the police and to criminal intelligence.
- Peter Vincent Addyman, Director, York Archaeological Trust. For services to archaeology.
- Professor Robert McNeill Alexander, lately Secretary, Zoological Society. For services to zoology.
- James Iain Walker Anderson, lately Special Adviser on the Millennium Bug. For services to industry.
- John William Baker, Chairman, Environment Task Force Advisory Group and Member, New Deal Task Force. For services to unemployed people and to educational standards.
- John David William Barnard, Dean, Faculty of Dental Surgery, the Royal College of Surgeons of England. For services to oral surgery and dentistry.
- Professor Janet Margaret Bately, Professor of English, King's College, London. For services to the study of Old and Middle English.
- Alexander Scott Bell, Group Managing Director, Standard Life Assurance Company. For services to the insurance industry in Scotland.
- Professor Donald Lynden-Bell, Professor of Astrophysics, University of Cambridge. For services to astronomy.
- Professor Colin Carmichael Bird, Provost and Dean, Faculty of Medicine, University of Edinburgh. For services to medicine.
- Alan Birks, Principal, South Birmingham College. For services to further education.
- Gautam Govindlal Bodiwala, Consultant, Leicester Royal Infirmary. For services to accident and emergency medicine.
- Frederick Edwin John Gedge Brackenbury, Chairman, Business in Sport and Leisure. For services to tourism, education and employment.
- Mrs Jane Mary Bradford, For services to business in the East Midlands.
- Mrs Gill Denise Brook, Clinical Nurse Specialist, Liver Unit, Birmingham Children's Hospital. For services to health care.
- Geoffrey Keith Bruce, lately Chief Executive, Pesticides Safety Directorate, Ministry of Agriculture, Fisheries and Food.
- Marcus Charles Buck, Chief Executive, The Queen Elizabeth II Conference Centre, Department of the Environment, Transport and the Regions.
- Willem Hendrik Buiter, For services to economics.
- Professor Alexander Cameron, Executive Director of Social Work, South Lanarkshire. For services to social work and to the prevention of drug misuse.
- David Ross Campbell, Chairman, Health Education Board for Scotland. For services to health education.
- Robert Trefor Campbell, OBE. For services to the food industry.
- Professor Peter Burns Carolin, Professor of Architecture, University of Cambridge. For services to architecture.
- Ian George Caulfield, Chief Executive, Warwickshire County Council. For services to local government.
- Rodney Frank Chase, Deputy Group Chief Executive, BP Amoco plc. For services to environmental protection.
- John William Chisholm, For services to the General Practitioners Committee, British Medical Association.
- Robert Clark, Director of Education, Wigan, Merseyside. For services to education.
- Robert Joseph Clark, South Eastern Circuit Administrator, Court Service Agency, Lord Chancellor's Department.
- Victor Cocker, Group Chief Executive, Severn Trent plc. For services to the water industry.
- Miss Suzanna Cooper, For public service.
- Ronald Dennis, Chairman and Chief Executive, TAG McLaren Group. For services to motor sport.
- Henry Andrew Cridland Densham, Joint Senior Partner, Burges Salmon Solicitors. For services to the agricultural industry.
- Andrew William Dilnot, Director, Institute for Fiscal Studies. For services to economics and economic policy.
- George Neilson Donaldson, For services to the timber industry.
- Morrison Alexander Rankin Dunbar, For services to the Royal Scottish Academy of Music and Drama Trust.
- Miss Rosalind Eyben, lately Chief Social Development Adviser, Department for International Development.
- Professor Ian Fells, Professor of Energy Conversion, University of Newcastle. For services to energy technology and policy.
- Leonard Raymond Fenwick, Chief Executive, Newcastle upon Tyne Hospitals NHS Trust. For services to the NHS.
- Miss Deirdre Christine Fordham, lately Divisional Manager, Disability Policy Division, Department for Education and Employment.
- William Michael Thomas Fowle, For services to the Business in the Community Partners in Leadership Mentoring Programme.
- Richard Stanley Francis, OBE. Author. For services to literature.
- Professor Hazel Gillian Genn, For services to research in civil justice.
- Mrs Kathleen Margaret Gibbons, Headteacher, St Kentigern's Academy, Bathgate. For services to education.
- Anthony Arthur Edward Glenton, MBE, TD. Chairman, Port of Tyne Authority. For services to the ports industry and to the community in North East England.
- Alastair Ross Goobey, Chief Executive, Hermes Pensions Management Ltd. For services to the pensions industry.
- Professor Roderic Keith Griffiths, Regional Director of Public Health, NHS Executive, Department of Health.
- George Edwin Guy, Head, Fire Policy Unit, Home Office.
- Professor Wendy Hall, Professor of Computer Science, University of Southampton. For services to education and science.
- Anthony Donald Hawkins, Director, Fisheries Research Services Executive Agency, Scottish Executive.
- Ms Ruth Henig, JP. Chair, Association of Police Authorities. For services to the police.
- Peter Michael Homa, Director, Commission for Health Improvement. For services to health care.
- Ms Elizabeth Jane Howard, Author. For services to literature.
- Professor Barry William Ife, Cervantes Professor of Spanish, King's College, London. For services to Hispanic studies.
- Mrs Yvonne Clare Jeffries, lately Headteacher, Haywood High School, Stoke-on-Trent. For service to education.
- Suresh Kamal Khanna, Director, Middle East and Africa, British Trade International, Department of Trade and Industry.
- Derek Robert Langslow, lately Chief Executive, English Nature. For services to nature conservation.
- Mrs Judith Littlewood, Chief Research Officer, Research Analysis and Evaluation Division, Department of the Environment, Transport and the Regions.
- Professor Richard Brabazon Macrory, Member, Royal Commission on Environmental Pollution. For services to environment protection and law.
- Mrs Kim Manley, Acting Head, Practice Development, Royal College of Nursing. For services to the development of quality care for patients.
- Mrs Mandy Shala Mayer, lately Head, Year 2000 Team, Cabinet Office.
- Allen James McClay, OBE. For services to the pharmaceutical industry and to industry/university partnerships.
- Ann McPherson, General Medical Practitioner, Oxford. For services to teenage health and to innovations in women's health care.
- Samuel Alexander Mendes, Theatre and film director. For services to drama.
- Professor Ian Cedric Milburn, Deputy Managing Director, Nissan Technical Centre Europe Ltd. For services to industry and science.
- Miss Anthea Christine Millett, For services to the Teacher Training Agency.
- Martin Anthony Mogg, For public service.
- Miss Oona Grant Muirhead, OBE. lately director of Information Strategy and News, Ministry of Defence.
- Raymond Francis O'Brien, Chairman, Speke Garston Development Company. For services to regeneration on Merseyside.
- Michael O'Connor, Director of the Millennium Commission. For services to the Millennium.
- Sean O'Dwyer, OBE, JP. Chairman, Omagh Fund. For services to industry, education and to the community.
- Professor Christopher John Oliver, Former Consultant, Defence Evaluation and Research Agency, Ministry of Defence.
- Philip Christopher Ondaatje, For charitable services to museums and galleries.
- Gordon Francis De Courcy Page, Chief Executive, Cobham plc. For services to the defence and aerospace industries.
- Michael Parkinson, For services to broadcasting.
- Laurence Arthur Pavelin, Grade 5, National Assembly for Wales.
- Miss Sian Phillips, Actress. For services to drama.
- Professor Anne Elizabeth Power, MBE. For services to regeneration and the promotion of resident participation.
- Ms Anne Quinn, Group Vice President, BP Amoco plc. For services to gas marketing.
- Roderick James Rennet, Chief Executive, East of Scotland Water Authority. For services to water supplies.
- Mervyn Rolfe, JP, DL. Depute Leader, Dundee City Council. For services to local government.
- Roger Colin Shelton, Managing Director, R Griggs Group plc. For services to the footwear manufacturing industry.
- Alan Sinclair, Chief Executive, Wise Group. For services to training for long-term unemployed people.
- Miss Prudence Patricia Skene, Dance Executive and Member, Arts Council of England. For services to the arts, especially dance.
- Joseph Desmond Smyth, For services to broadcasting and to business.
- Mrs Saxon May Spence, Member, Devon County Council. For services to local government.
- Neil Spencer, Deputy Director, HM Board of Inland Revenue.
- John Stannard, Director, National Literacy Strategy, Department for Education and Employment.
- Brian Reginald Taylor, lately Chief Executive, Wardle Storeys plc. For services to the defence and aerospace industries.
- Keith Henry Taylor, lately Chairman, Esso UK plc. For services to the oil and gas industry.
- Professor Janet Thornton, FRS. For services to structural biology.
- Stewart Till, lately President, Universal Pictures International. For services to the film industry.
- Professor Anthea Margaret Tinker, For services to housing for older people.
- David Christopher Veness, QPM. Assistant Commissioner, Metropolitan Police Service. For services to the police.
- Christopher James Vickers, Chairman, Construction Industry Board. For services to surveying and to the construction industry.
- Professor Leslie Wagner, Vice-Chancellor, Leeds Metropolitan University. For services to higher education and to the Jewish community.
- Mrs Janet Anne Warwick, Headteacher, Rhyn Park School, St Martins, Oswestry, Shropshire. For services to education.
- Miss Fanny Waterman, OBE. Chairman, Leeds International Pianoforte Competition. For services to music.
- William Powell Wilkins, For services to environmental projects in West Wales.
- Professor Robert George Will, Director, Creutzfeldt-Jacob Disease Surveillance Unit. For services to health care.
- Mrs Pamela Jill Wilson, TEC Director, Further Education Funding Council Committee for Yorkshire and Humberside. For services to education and training.
- Martin Harry Wolf, Associate Editor and Chief Economics Commentator, The Financial Times. For services to financial journalism.
- John Henry Wonnacott, Painter. For services to art.
- James Humphrey George Woollcombe, Chairman, Devon and Cornwall Careers. For services to young people.
- Alan Will Wyatt, lately Chief Executive, broadcasting, BBC. For services to broadcasting.

Diplomatic list:

- Professor John Argyris, FRSl For services to Mathematics and Engineering.
- Baroness Heather Renwick Brigstocke, For services to the English Speaking Union.
- Miss Christina Hambley Brown, For services to journalism overseas.
- Jonathan Carr, For services to UK-German relations.
- Frances, Lady Clarke, OBE. For services to UK-Italian cultural relations.
- Maurice Flanagan, For services to UK-Dubai trade and community relations.
- Professor George Ernest Kalmus, FRSl For services to particle physics research.
- Professor Paul Kennedy, For services to contemporary history.
- Professor Paul Preston, For services to UK-Spanish cultural relations.
- John Nigel Barten Sinclair, For services to British interests, California, USA.

==== Officer of the Order of the British Empire (OBE) ====
Military division:

Navy

- Commander Stephen Harry Guy Bennett, Royal Navy.
- Commander Russell Richard Best, Royal Navy.
- Commander Richard Farrington, Royal Navy.
- Commander Christopher Sutcliffe Hadden, Royal Navy.
- Captain Patricia Margaret Hambling, A.R.R.C, Quen Alexandra's Royal Naval Nursing Service.
- Surgeon Commander Steven John Ryder, Royal Navy.
- Commander Andrew Young, Royal Navy.

Army

- Lieutenant Colonel Paul Vivian Budd (503772), The Royal Logistic Corps.
- Colonel Geoffrey Charles William Dodds, M.B.E. (504445) late Corps of Royal Engineers.
- Lieutenant Colonel Michael John Tooth Hewetson (484250), Army Air Corps.
- Lieutenant Colonel Christopher Glyn Sheridan Hughes (518370), The Staffordshire Regiment.
- Lieutenant Colonel Peter Douglas McLelland (483971), The Princess of Wales's Royal Regiment.
- Lieutenant Colonel Jonathan David Page, M.B.E. (512953), The Parachute Regiment.
- Acting Colonel Thomas Quinn (458510), 1st (Northern Ireland) Battalion, Army Cadet Force.
- Lieutenant Colonel Alan William Richards, M.B.E., M.M. (520931), The Parachute Regiment.
- Lieutenant Colonel Ronald Martin Smith (479432), Royal Regiment of Artillery, Territorial Army.
- Lieutenant Colonel Robert Andrew Steel (514968), Army Physical Training Corps.
- Lieutenant Colonel Stuart Alastair Watts (514971), Corps of Army Music.

Royal Air Force

- Wing Commander Gary Barber (4232609S), Royal Air Force.
- Wing Commander Peter James Brook (5201370D), Royal Air Force.
- Wing Commander John Anthony Cooke (0594667G), Royal Air Force.
- Wing Commander Jeremy Nicholas Fradgley, A.F.C. (5204057D), Royal Air Force.
- Wing Commander Gerald Henry Monte, A.E. (2617393R), Royal Air Force Reserve.
- Wing Commander Edna Felicity Partridge (9159P), Royal Auxiliary Air Force.
- Wing Commander Gareth Alun Williams (8027103F), Royal Air Force.

Civil division

- John Philip Aldridge, D.L., Chairman, Methodist Recorder. For services to the Regional Newspaper Industry.
- Donald Robertson Anderson. For services to International Trade and to the Textile Industry.
- Elizabeth, Lady Andrew. For services to the Prisoners' Education Trust.
- John Roper Appleton. For services to the Royal Academy of Engineering.
- James Christopher Armfield. For services to Association Football.
- Janet, Mrs. Atfield. For services to Promoting Volunteering.
- Stanley Ayling, Head of Transport and Travel, H.M. Board of Inland Revenue.
- Oliver Humphrey Baines, Director, Cornwall Rural Community Council, Cornish Millennium Projects. For services to the Millennium.
- Ben Ball, Associate Director, Career Development Unit, University of Sussex. For services to Careers Guidance.
- Terrence Donald Bamford, lately Executive Director, Housing and Social Services, Royal Borough of Kensington and Chelsea, London. For services to the community.
- Neil Vivian Bartlett, Artistic Director, Lyric Theatre, Hammersmith. For services to the Arts.
- Alan Bean, Group Manager, Court Service Agency, Lord Chancellor's Department.
- James Gordon Beaton, Registrar of the Scottish Court in the Netherlands, Scottish Executive.
- Charles John Beattie. For public service.
- Barbara, Mrs. Bells, Headteacher, Wingate Nursery School, Durham. For services to Education.
- Kay Margaret Kingwell, Mrs. Begg. For services to Family Mediation.
- Patricia Ann, Mrs. Bennett. For services to Swimming for People with Disabilities.
- Colin Edward Birt, Grade 7, Home Office.
- Gerald John Black, lately Director of Housing, Perth and Kinross Council. For services to Housing.
- Professor Andrew Blowers, Member, Radioactive Waste Management Advisory Committee. For services to Environmental Protection.
- John Leslie Bone, Grade 7, Ministry of Defence.
- David James Bonnar, lately Lottery Director, Scottish Arts Council. For services to the Millennium.
- David Alexander Borland, Deputy Group Valuation Officer, Valuation Office Agency, HM Board of Inland Revenue.
- Dorit Paula, Mrs. Braun. For services to Parenting.
- David John Brooks, Head of Business Support, Employment Services, Department for Education and Employment, North West Region.
- Jean Elizabeth, Mrs. Brown, Grade 6, Child Support Agency, Department of Social Security.
- Michael John Brundell, Principal Housing and Planning Inspector, Planning Inspectorate, Department of the Environment, Transport and the Regions.
- Michael John Brunson, lately Political Editor, ITN. For services to Broadcasting.
- Mary Josephine, Mrs. Brydon. For services to Allergy Nursing.
- James Anthony Burke, Headteacher, Cardinal Heenan RC High School, Liverpool. For services to Education.
- Miss Lulu Kennedy-Cairns, Singer and Entertainer. For services to Music.
- Professor Peter Calow, Chairman, Advisory Committee on Hazardous Substances. For services to Environmental Protection.
- William Cameron, Chairman, Walter Alexander plc. For services to Manufacturing.
- Maureen Rosalind, Mrs. Campion, Policy Adviser, VAT Policy Analysis and Formulation, H.M. Board of Customs and Excise.
- Anthony Edward Cardell, Principal Scientist, Defence Evaluation and Research Agency, Ministry of Defence.
- Shiela Eadie, Mrs. Campion, Consultant, National Institute of Adult Continuing Education. For services to Adult Education.
- Professor Yvonne Helen Carter, Professor of General Practice and Primary Care, Queen Mary and Westfield College, London. For services to Health Research.
- John Alfred Cashen. For public service on the Isle of Man.
- Sibdas Chakrabarti, Senior Bridge Engineer, Highways Agency, Department of the Environment, Transport and the Regions.
- John William Chappelow, Grade 7, Defence Evaluation and Research Agency, Ministry of Defence.
- Jagdish Chander Chawla, Consultant Ophthalmologist, Royal Alexandra Hospital NHS Trust, Paisley. For services to Ophthalmology.
- David Nowell Clark, lately Chairman, Botanics Trading Company. For services to the Royal Botanic Garden, Edinburgh.
- Christopher James (Chris) Clarke, Leader, Somerset County Council. For services to Local Government and to the community in South West England.
- John Wilson Clarke. For services to St John Ambulance.
- The Reverend Robert Sydney Clarke. For services to Chaplaincy in the NHS.
- Barry Stanley Cleverdon, Chief Executive, National Exhibition Centre Group. For services to Business in the West Midlands.
- Palma Clara Rosa, Mrs. Coggins. For services to Victim Support.
- Stanley Cohen, For charitable services to the community, especially the Duke of Edinburgh's Award, in London.
- Wendy, Mrs. Colley. For services to Continence Nursing in West Cumbria.
- James Gerard Connelly, Headteacher, Firpark School, Motherwell. For services to Pupils with Special Educational Needs.
- Anthony Brian Connolly. For services to the Steel Industry and to Industrial Relations in Wales.
- John Connolly, Leader, Falkirk Council. For services to local Government.
- Mary, Mrs. Curnock-Cook, Chief Executive, British Institute of Innkeeping. For services to Training in the Hospitality and Tourism Industries.
- Peter Cook, Chairman, International Air Transport Association Year 2000 Project. For services to the Millennium Bug in the Aviation Industry.
- Ms Anne-Marie Costain, Managing Director, Planning and Transport Research and Computation. For services to Education and Training in Transport.
- Wing Commander John Stewart Cresswell, R.A.F. (Retd.). For services to the Church Lads' and Church Girls' Brigade.
- Wendy Elizabeth, Mrs. Crockett, Special Educational Needs Co-ordinator, Alderman Blaxill School, Colchester, Essex. For services to Education.
- Hermione Mary, Mrs. Crosfield. For services to the British Red Cross Society in London.
- Patrick Francis Curran, Grade 7, Department for Education and Employment.
- Malcolm Raymond Curtis, M.B.E., lately Director General, People's Dispensary for Sick Animals. For services to Animal Welfare.
- Eric Samuel Dalzell. For public service.
- Gethin Davies. For services to the Birmingham Mentoring Consortium Millennium Award Scheme.
- Lennard Davies. For services to the Administration of Justice and to the community in Teesside.
- Derek Deane, Artistic Director, English National Ballet. For services to Dance.
- Martin Joseph Dent. For services to International Development and Relief from Debts.
- Ronald Leitch Devlin, Director, Pensions Review, Financial Services Authority. For services to Financial Regulation.
- Norman Colin Dexter, Author. For services to Literature.
- Bernard Dixon. For services to Scientific Journalism.
- Thomas Dixon, Head of Design, Habitat. For services to Design and Innovation.
- Malcolm Terence Doherty, Leader, Blackburn with Darwen Unitary Council. For services to the community in Lancashire.
- Miss Rosemary Inez Doidge. For services to the Civil Service Benevolent Fund.
- Richard Edwin Dolby, Research and Technology Director, TWI. For services to Industry and to Technology Transfer.
- Miss Sara Jane Donaldson, National Programme Director, New Millennium Experience Company. For services to the Millennium Dome.
- Timothy Gerard Doran, Head, Service and Contract Management, H.M. Board of Customs and Excise.
- Brian George Kirby Downing. For services to the England and Wales Cricket Board.
- Aires Angelo Barnabe Barros D'Sa, Consultant Vascular Surgeon, Royal Victoria Hospital. For services to Vascular Surgery.
- Peter William East, Technical Director, Racal Radar Defence Systems Ltd. For services to the Defence Industry.
- John Eggleston. For services to the National Space Science Centre, Leicester.
- Professor Marianne Elliott, Professor of Modern History, University of Liverpool. For services to Irish Studies and to the Northern Ireland Peace Process.
- Ms Rebecca Jane Endean, Grade 6, Department of Social Security.
- David Ennis, Senior Director, OKI (UK) Ltd. For services to Human Resources and to the Electronics Industry.
- Jill Teresa, Mrs. Evans, Founder, Cardiac Rehabilitation Clinic, Royal Gwent Hospital. For services to Nursing and to the Development of Cardiac Rehabilitation Services.
- Mark Fisher. For services to the Millennium Experience Show.
- James Adams Fleming, Headteacher, Balfron High School. For services to Secondary Education in Balfron, Stirlingshire.
- Captain Jeremy Robert Fox, M.B.E. For services to Modern Pentathlon.
- Kenneth John Friar, Managing Director, Arsenal Football Club. For services to Association Football.
- Margaret Rose, Mrs. Garbett, lately Ward Manager, Spinal Injuries Unit, Robert Jones and Agnes Hunt District Orthopaedic Hospital, Oswestry, Shropshire. For services to Nursing.
- John Sydney Garside, J.P., D.L. For services to the community in Warrington, Cheshire.
- James Alexander Girdwood. For services to the Army Benevolent Fund.
- Andrew Goldsworthy, Sculptor.
- Dugald Trystan Julius Herber Gonsal, Lately Chief Engineer, London Borough of Camden. For services to Highway and Civil Engineering.
- Henry Anthony Goodman. For services to Fair Employment.
- Andrew Patrick Gray, Grade 7, Ministry of Defence.
- Jennifer Margaret, Mrs. Green. For services to the RAF Widows' Association.
- Professor Donald Grierson, Professor of Plant Physiology, University of Nottingham. For services to Plant Gene Regulation.
- Gillian, Mrs. Hancock, President, Hertfordshire Council for Voluntary Youth Service. For services to Young People and to Guiding.
- Ms Gillian Haynes, Chief Executive, National Childminding Association. For services to Childminding.
- Michael John Healey, lately Grade 7, Ministry of Defence.
- Mary Campbell Syme, Mrs. Heathcote, Assistant Director, Foresight Directorate, Department of Trade and Industry.
- Paul John Heron, Head, Public Service Broadcasting Branch, Department for Culture, Media and Sport.
- Jean, Mrs. Heslop, Headteacher, Mixenden Junior and Infants School, Halifax, West Yorkshire. For services to Education.
- Elisabeth Cargill, Mrs. Hill, lately Vice Chairman, Scottish Association of Mental Health. For services to Sufferers of Mental Illness and Drug and Alcohol Misuse.
- Robert Trant Hillier, Chairman, Hampshire Training and Enterprise Council. For services to Education and Training.
- Mohammed Surur Hoda. For services to Community Relations and to International Human Rights.
- Clifford Lionel Hodgetts, D.L. For Legal Services to the Church of England.
- Professor John Henry Holloway, Professor of Inorganic Chemistry, University of Leicester. For services to Education and to Chemistry.
- Ms Premila Hoon, Financier. For services to the Film Industry.
- Pierre Francois Horsfall. For services to the community on Jersey.
- John Bede Howell. For services to Forestry and to the Royal Forestry Society.
- Professor Amritpal Singh Hungin. For services to General Practice Research.
- John Michael Graham Hunt, Chief Executive and Secretary, British Dental Association. For services to the Dental Profession.
- Nola, Mrs. Ishmael, Nursing Officer, Department of Health.
- Bryan Samuel Jackson, Senior Director, Toyota Motor Manufacturing (UK) Ltd. For services to the Motor Manufacturing Industry.
- John Jeffries, Officer in Charge, H.M. Board of Inland Revenue.
- Pamela Maureen, Mrs. Kirby Johnson, Director General, Grain and Feed Trade Association. For services to the Grain and Feed Trade.
- Ms Susan Johnson, Director of Business Development, Yorkshire Forward. For services to the New Deal in North East England.
- Graham Henry Jones, Patent Agent. For services to Small Firms' Interest in Intellectual Property.
- Richard Price Jones, Grade 6, Department for International Development.
- Ms Amanda Jordan. For services to the National Lottery Charities' Board.
- Ms Ruth Joyce. For services to Drug Education.
- Anthony Keeley, Depute Chief Development Officer, Higher Still Development Unit. For services to Secondary Education in Scotland.
- Laurence John Keen, President, British Archaeological Association. For services to Archaeology.
- Anthony James Kenny, Headteacher, Harborne Junior School, Birmingham. For services to Education.
- John David Kirby. For services to the Oesophageal Patients' Association.
- Phillip Charles Kirby. For services to the Gas Industry and to the Environment.
- Ms Emma Kirkby, Singer. For services to Music.
- Alan William Kirkwood, Policy Directorate, Crown Prosecution Service.
- Martin Kitchen, Q.F.S.M., Chief Fire Officer, Surrey Fire and Rescue Service. For services to the Fire Service.
- William Robert Morrison Knox, M.B.E. For services to Housing.
- Christopher Maurice Laing, lately Chairman, National Playing Fields Association. For services to Sport and Recreation.
- Philip John Lee, lately Managing Director, British Aerospace Royal Ordnance. For services to the Defence Industry.
- Leila, Mrs. Lessof, Chairman, Moorfields NHS Hospital Trust. For services to Public Health.
- Michael David Lippold, Chairman of the Trustees, Church Floodlighting Project. For services to the Millennium.
- Barrie Irving Liss, J.P., Chairman, Re-Solv. For services to the Prevention of Solvent and Volatile Substance Abuse.
- Miss Sarah Lavinia Langton-Lockton, Chief Executive, Centre for Accessible Environments. For Services to Disabled People.
- Michael Logue. For services to Juvenile Justice.
- David William Longhurst, Grade 6, Ministry of Defence.
- Catherine, Mrs. MacLeod, Headteacher, Isobel Mair School, Clarkston. For services to Special Educational Needs in East Renfrewshire.
- John Robert Madejski. For services to Reading Football Club and the community in Reading, Berkshire.
- Rafeek Hosni Mahmood, Medical Director, Wirral Hospitals NHS Trust. For services to Medical Management.
- Professor Robert Austin Markus, Emeritus Professor, University of Nottingham. For services to Ecclesiastical History.
- Professor Alan Marsh. For services to Social Policy Research.
- Nigel Matthews, Group Secretary, J. Sainsbury plc. For services to Food Retailing.
- Suzanne Caroline, Mrs. May, Chairman, Transport 2000. For services to Public Transport.
- Cormick McChord, Chairman, East Region Board, Scottish Environment Protection Agency. For services to Environmental Protection.
- William Donn McConnell. For public service.
- Professor Barry McCormick. For services to Paediatric Audiology.
- Frank McGettigan. For services to Broadcasting and training.
- Christopher Halliday McGhie, Chairman, Dumfries and Galloway College. For services to Education and to Business.
- Lieutenant Colonel David Hart McLellan, D.L. For services to the Soldiers', Sailors' and Airmen's Families Association in Cheshire.
- Miss Lorna Martin McPhail, Police Surgeon, Tayside Police. For services to the Police Surgeon Service.
- Miss Soulamif Messerer. For services to Dance.
- Ms Anne Elizabeth Minto, Human Resources Director, Smiths Industries Plc. For services to the Engineering Industry.
- Captain William Edward Morris, R.N. (Retd). For services to the Sea Cadet Corps in South West England.
- Lionel Edmund Morrison, lately Chairman, Notting Hill Housing Association. For services to the Housing Sector.
- John Gerald Mulgrew, Director of Education, East Ayrshire Council. For services to Education.
- Ulric Adolphus Murray, Inspector, Social Service Inspectorate, Department of Health.
- Joyce Carruthers, Mrs. Nash, Chairman, Barbican Centre Committee. For services to the City of London and to the Arts.
- Timothy Charles Newell, Governor 1, H.M. Prison Grendon and Spring Hill, Prison Service, Home Office.
- Nigel Nicolson, M.B.E., President, National Trust Association, Tenterden, Kent. For services to Literature and to the Historic Environment.
- Stephanie Mary, Lady North, J.P., D.L., Chairman, Central Probation Council. For services to the Rehabilitation of Offenders.
- Michael Rowan Hamilton John O’Regan, Co-founder, RM plc and Member, Learning Region Taskforce. For services to Education, Training and Economic Development in South East England.
- David William Ogden, President, Institution of Highways and Transportation. For services to Transportation and to the Engineering Profession.
- John Joseph Oliver, Chairman of Governors, Runshaw College, Preston, Lancashire. For services to Further Education.
- Wendy, Mrs. Osborne. For services to Volunteering.
- Angela Jane Louise, Mrs. Ould, lately Regional Director, Ministry of Agriculture, Fisheries and Food.
- Richard Pacey, Chief Executive, Wilf Ward Family Trust. For services to the community, especially people with Learning Disabilities, in Yorkshire.
- Charles Daniel Whyte Parkes, Wildlife Liaison Officer, Derbyshire Constabulary. For services to the Protection of Wildlife.
- Keith Clifford Parry, Director of Information and Communications Technology, Hyde Technology School, Tameside, Manchester. For services to Education.
- Thomas John Parry, Headteacher, Tonyrefail Comprehensive School, South Wales. For services to Education.
- Sue, Mrs. Parsons, Headteacher, Llanidloes Community Primary School, Powys. For services to Education in Wales.
- Bryan Paterson, lately Deputy Director, Estates Directorate, Scottish Prison Service, Scottish Executive.
- Diana Georgina, Mrs. Patterson. For services to Health Care for Substance Misusers.
- Miss Linda Joyce Patterson, Medical Director, Burnley Health Care NHS Trust. For services to Medical Management.
- Professor David William Pearce, Associate Director, Centre for Social and Economic Research into the Global Environment. For services to Sustainable Development.
- Bruno Peek. For services to the Millennium Beacon.
- Susan Alison Pember, Principal and Executive Director, Canterbury College, Kent. For services to Further Education.
- Shirla Marjorie, Mrs. Philogene. For services to Nursing Leadership and Development.
- Miss Anna Sheelagh Pidduck. For public service.
- Sir John Richard Walter Reginald Carew Pole, Bt., D.L. For services to the Tate Gallery in St. Ives and to the community in Cornwall.
- Martin Richard Prosser. For services to the Competition Commission.
- Harold Albert Quinton, Chief Executive, Foundation Training Company. For services to Young Offenders.
- Geoffrey Luigi Paolo Randall, Director, Brixham Environmental Laboratory, AstraZeneca. For services to the Chemical Industry.
- Stephen James Rayner, Grade 7, Ministry of Defence.
- Laura Read, Deputy Chief Executive, Deafblind UK. For services to the Millennium Awards Scheme.
- David Robert Richardson, Chairman LEAF. For services to Integrated Farming.
- Ms Marianne Rigge, Director, College of Health. For services to Health Services.
- Elizabeth, Mrs. Roberts, Headteacher, Hawarden Infants School, Flintshire. For services to Education.
- Professor Eric Hwyel Roberts. For services to Agricultural Research.
- Peter Charles Roberts. For services to the New Deal in South West England.
- Patrick Nicholas Seaborn Hickman Robertson, lately Director of Marketing, National Savings Agency.
- Brian William Robinson, President, Safety and Reliability Society. For services to Health and Safety in Industry.
- Martin John Wyndham Rogers. For services to the Farmington Institute Millennium Awards Scheme.
- Ms Joanne K. Rowling, Author. For services to Children's Literature.
- Joan, Mrs. Rule. For services to Psychiatry for Elderly People in Neath Port Talbot.
- Ms Angela Elizabeth Salt, Director of Communications, Millennium Commission. For services to the Millennium.
- Ms Su Joscelyn Sayer, Chief Executive, United Response. For services to Disabled People.
- Elizabeth, Mrs. Seddon, Teacher in Charge, Language Department, Elmtree School, Chesham, Buckinghamshire. For services to Special Needs Education.
- John Anthony Self, lately General Manager, Jubilee and East London Line. For services to London Transport.
- Gillian Ann, Mrs. Sheddick, Joint Managing Director, Norbert Dentressangle Wales and West. For services to Enterprise and Training in South Wales.
- John Sheldon, General Secretary, Public and Commercial Services Union. For services to Trades Unionism.
- Philip Hedley Shimmin, Director of Roads and Transport, Highland Council. For services to Road and Transport in the Highlands and Islands.
- Linda Ann, Mrs. Short, Leader, Congleton Borough Council. For services to Local Government and to the community.
- Dabinderjit Singh Sidhu, Audit Manager, National Audit Office.
- Ms Josette Patricia Simon, Actress. For services to Drama.
- Andrew Slatter, Grade 6, Ministry of Defence.
- Miss Marjorie Small, Manager, Clinical Haematology (Cancer) Unit, Heartlands Hospital, Birmingham. For services to Nursing.
- Alex Smith, President, Scottish Fisherman's Federation. For services to the Fishing Industry.
- Timothy John Stevens, lately Assistant Director (Collections), Victoria and Albert Museum. For services to Art.
- Charles Gad Strasser. For services to the community in Jersey and Staffordshire.
- George Henzell Moody-Stuart, Chairman, Transparency International (UK). For services to the Fight against Corruption.
- Deyan Sudjic. For services to Architecture.
- Ms Corinne Joy Swain, Director, Ove Arup Partners and Member, DETR Planning Research Advisory Group. For services to Planning.
- Professor Norman John Taylor. For services to the Surrey Institute of Art and Design, University College and to Higher Education.
- David Ellis Wyn Thomas. For services to Planning and Landscape Architecture in Wales.
- Professor George Edward Thompson, Head, Corrosion and Protection Centre, UMIST. For services to the Defence Industry.
- Mary, Mrs. Thorley, Primary Education Adviser for Pembrokeshire. For services to Education in Wales.
- Alan John Thornley, Wildlife Liaison Officer, Derbyshire Constabulary. For services to the Protection of Wildlife.
- William Elliott Thorpe, Principal Crown Prosecutor, Crown Prosecution Service.
- Judith Ellen, Mrs. Timms, Chief Executive, the National Youth Advocacy Service. For services to Young People.
- Philip Bernard Hague Tinker, Governor, Macaulay Land Research Institute. For services to Science.
- Professor Eleuterio Francisco Toro, Research Professor of Applied Mathematics, Manchester Metropolitan University. For services to the Defence Industry.
- Janet Margaret, Mrs. Trewsdale. For services to Economics and to Statistics.
- Peter Hedley Turner, Managing Director, Scheibler Filters Ltd. For services to Export.
- Colin David Tweedy, Chief Executive, Arts & Business. For services to Business Partnership with the Arts.
- Miss Judith Rose Unwin. For services to Export Promotion in South Asia.
- Isobel Scott-Telford, Mrs. Veitch, Headteacher, Williamston Primary School, Livingston, West Lothian. For services to Education.
- Caroline, Lady Waldegrave, Principal and Managing Director, Leith's School of Food and Wine. For services to the Catering Industry.
- Susan Mary Walton, Policy Adviser, H.M. Board of Inland Revenue.
- Ms Anne Judith Weyman, Chief Executive, FPA. For services to Family Planning.
- David Whiteford, Partner, Castlecraig Farms, Cromarty. For services to the Pig Industry.
- Hugh Edgar Williams. For services to Foresight and to Wealth Creation from Science and Technology.
- Paul Michael Williams, Chief Executive, Bro Morgannwg Trust, For services to the NHS in Wales.
- Daniel McCorgray Williamson, Inspector of Taxes, H.M. Board of Inland Revenue.
- Miss Judy Ling Wong, Director, Black Environment Network. For services to Ethnic Environmental Participation.
- Raymond George Patrick Wood, Detective Constable, Metropolitan Police Service. For services to the Police.

Diplomatic and Overseas list:

- William Harvey Adamson. For services to British commercial interests in Argentina.
- Richard Hargreaves Atherton. For services to British commercial interests in Mexico.
- Dr. Barbara Bertha Ball. For public service, Bermuda.
- Andrew Mullion Barwick Bell. For services to the community, St. Helena.
- Miss Jana Eve Bennett. For services to scientific broadcasting.
- Michael Roger Binyon. For services to international journalism.
- David Andrew Campbell. For services to farming development in Africa.
- Mary Leonora, Mrs. Carrington. For the services to the arts and charity.
- Denise Margaret, Mrs. Carter. Director of Re-unite (National Council for Abducted Children).
- Woodman Mark Lowes Dickinson. H.M. Ambassador, Skopje.
- Iain Fleming Elliot, Director, Britain Russia Centre.
- Charles Francis Formby, M.B.E. Lately British Consul, Seville.
- David Wade Foster. For community service, Cayman Islands.
- Robert Hugh Gordon, M.B.E. Head, British Interests Section, Belgrade.
- Philip Hall. For services to conservation and human rights, Nigeria.
- Michael Christopher Hardy. Head, Overseas training and development, British Council Headquarters.
- Sheila Mary, Mrs. Hehmeyer. For services to British cultural interests, USA.
- Roger Alan Holehouse. First Secretary, Foreign and Commonwealth Office.
- Giancarlo Angelo Giuseppe Laurenzi. Executive Director, National Council for the Welfare of Prisoners Abroad.
- The Reverend Canon Brian Montague Lea. For services to the community, The Netherlands.
- Major Norman John Lister, M.B.E. Honorary British Consul, Trieste.
- Andrew George MacDonald. For services to the British community, São Paulo.
- William Robert Mller. For services to British charitable interests, USA.
- Miss Norma Edwina Morton. For services to international journalism.
- Dr. Morna Lorena Nance. Head, UK Customer Services, British Council.
- Miss Dancia Penn, Q.C., Lately Attorney General, British Virgin Islands.
- Shoba, Mrs. Ponnappa, Director, British Council, Mauritius.
- Sheena, Mrs. Campbell-Royle. For services to British commercial interests, Spain
- Dr. Alan Keith Russell. For services to UK-German relations.
- Jeremy Keith Hayward-Surry. For services to British business interests overseas.
- Ian Keith Thomson, First Secretary, Foreign and Commonwealth Office.
- Martin Cuthbert Tunstall. For services to British- French trade.
- Pamela, Mrs. Walsh. For services to UK-Swiss relations.
- Robert Webb, Head of Governor's Office, Montserrat.
- Dr. Hilton Carter Whittle. For services to medical research, The Gambia.
- Harold Williams. For services to Oxford-Bonn town twinning.
- Ruth Kyre Holliday, Mrs. Wooldridge. For services to the terminally ill in developing countries.
- Julian David Hugh Peel Yates, Head, Office for Democratic Institutions and Human Rights mission in Montenegro.

==== Member of the Order of the British Empire (MBE) ====
- Edward Abbott, Senior Caretaker, Walton Comprehensive School, Peterborough, Cambridgeshire. For services to Education.
- Miss Malika Abdullah, Probation Officer, Nottingham Probation Service. For services to the Probation Service and to Community Relations.
- John Richard Adair. For services to the Police.
- George William Adamson, Co-ordinator of Music and Expressive Performing Arts, Duchess's County High School, Alnwick, Northumberland. For services to Education.
- David Laurie Agass, Extra Curriculum Sports Co-ordinator, Langdon School, Newham, London. For services to Sport for Young People.
- Charles Alexander Agnew. For services to Road Safety.
- Muhammad Manazir Ahsan. For services to the Lambeth Group and to the Millennium Dome.
- Isola Akay. For services to the All Stars Youth Club, London.
- Peter Albertella. For services to the community in Billington, Bedfordshire.
- Dorothy, Mrs. Armitage. For services to the community, especially the Soroptomists, in the Medway Towns, Kent.
- Alan Francis Ashton. For services to the Lytham Heritage Group in Lytham St Anne's, Lancashire.
- Keith Brian Atkinson. For services to Photogrammetric Science.
- Geraldine Yvonne, Mrs. Auerbach, Director, Jewish Music Institute. For services to Music.
- Frederick Gordon Austin. For services to the community, especially Blind People, in Brighton, East Sussex.
- John Austin. For charitable services to the community, especially Disabled People, in Uttoxeter, Staffordshire.
- Joseph Henry Austin. For services to Trades Unionism in East Anglia.
- Mazharullah Awan, Founder, AMC Vehicle Maintenance Service. For services to the Vehicle Repair Industry in South East London.
- Miss Ann Carol Bagehot. For services to the Gypsy Community.
- Carole, Mrs. Bailey, Administrative Officer, Department of Social Security.
- Robert E. J. Bailey. For services to Southport Hospitals, Lancashire.
- Miss Jane Elizabeth Baker, J.P., Executive Officer, Benefits Agency, Department of Social Security.
- Janet, Mrs. Baker. For services to Guiding in Cambridge.
- Poppy Louise, Mrs. Baker. For services to the Leukaemia Research Fund in Redbridge, Essex.
- Miss Pamela Edith Ballantine. For services to Race Equality in Redbridge, London.
- May, Mrs. Bamber. For services to the Cancer Research Campaign in Lytham St Anne's, Lancashire.
- Pamela Doris May, Mrs. Bambrough. For services to the Immigration Service and to the community in Northam, Hampshire.
- Ivan Bamford, Chief Commandant, Derbyshire Special Constabulary. For services to the Police.
- Frederick Harold Frith Banbury, Theatre Director. For services to Drama.
- Sarah H., Mrs. Bannerman, Cleaner/Janitor, Cardonald College, Glasgow. For services to Student Support in Further Education.
- Edwin James Wright Bannock, Manager, Transco's Action 2000. For services to preparation for the Millennium Bug in the Gas Industry.
- Colin Barden, Engineer, SEEBOARD. For services to the Electricity Industry.
- Helen Mary, Mrs. Barker. For services to the community in Ipswich, Suffolk.
- John Morris Barnett, Chairman, Radio Wave, Blackpool. For services to Radio Broadcasting.
- John James Barnie, Police Constable, Metropolitan Police Service. For services to the Police.
- Alan Frederick Barton. For services to the Fire Services National Benevolent Fund.
- Miss Christine Barton. For services to Disabled People and to Equal Opportunities.
- Malcolm Raymond Barton. For services to Groundwork's Changing Places Project.
- Elizabeth Tait, Mrs. Bathgate. For services to the rural community in Peebles-shire.
- Donald Robert Bean. For services to the RAF Association in West Sussex.
- Sinclair Beecham, Co-Chairman, Pret a Manger. For services to the Catering Industry.
- Jean Ellen, Mrs. Beeson, Manager, H.M. Board of Inland Revenue.
- Carole, Mrs. Bell, Project Manager, Meadowell Resource Centre. For services to the community in North Tyneside.
- G. Derek F. Bell, Composer. For services to Traditional Music.
- Joseph William Bennett, Boat Manager, Marconi Marine. For services to the Defence Industry.
- Catherine, Mrs. Benton, Water Regulations/Sampling Manager, West of Scotland Water Authority. For services to the Quality of Water Supplies in Scotland.
- Michael Glenn Berry. For services to Animal Welfare in Somerset.
- Archibald H. Bevan. For services to the St Magnus Festival, Orkney.
- Elizabeth, Mrs. Bevan, Health Visitor, North Glamorgan NHS Trust. For services to Primary Health Care in South Wales.
- William Derek Bevan, Referee. For services to Rugby Union Football.
- Sylvia, Mrs. Beynon. For services to the Church Lads' and Church Girls' Brigade in Doncaster, South Yorkshire.
- Carl Brian Bickler, General Medical Practitioner, Edinburgh. For services to General Practice.
- Ms Ann Ellaline Blackburn, lately General Manager. District Line, London Underground. For services to Public Transport.
- Joan Valerie, Mrs. Bliss. For services to the Campaign against Domestic Violence in Chelmsford, Essex.
- Albert Edward Le Blond, Founder, ALB Holdings. For services to the Ship Repair Industry.
- Miss Delores Elizabeth Geraldine Boase, Compliance Manager, H.M. Board of Inland Revenue.
- John Bond, Pay Span 5, Lord Chancellor's Department.
- Celia Blanche, Mrs. Brain. For services to Cancer and Leukaemia in Childhood and to fostering in Charlton Musgrove, Somerset.
- John Richard Brain. For services to Cancer and Leukaemia in Childhood and to fostering in Charlton Musgrove, Somerset.
- Elsie, Mrs. Brearley. For services to the Citizens' Advice Bureau in Dunstable, Bedfordshire.
- Barbara Doreen, Mrs. Brettell. For services to MENCAP in Swindon, Wiltshire.
- Ronald Alfred Claude Brindley. For services to the community in Kidmore End and Sonning Common, Berkshire.
- William Brodie. For services to the community in East Linton, East Lothian.
- George Henry Brookes. For services to Music in Llandudno and Conwy, North Wales.
- Miss Sandra Marjorie Brough, Typist, H.M. Board of Customs and Excise.
- John William Brown. For services to the St John's Ambulance Brigade in Devon.
- Marjorie, Mrs. Brown, Midwifery Sister, Northumbria Healthcare NHS Trust. For services to Midwifery.
- Roynon Brown, Member, Kessingland Parish Council. For services to the community in Suffolk.
- Stephanie, Mrs. Brown, Director of Training, Dundee and Tayside Chamber of Commerce and Industry. For services to the New Deal in Tayside.
- Ronnie Bryant, J.P. For services to the Administration of Justice in North East London.
- Richard Josef Buchta, Matra BAe Dynamics. For services to the Defence Industry.
- Wilfred Buckley. For services to the Boys' Brigade in Nottingham.
- Nan, Mrs. Budge, Lately Secretary and Treasurer, Caithness Agricultural Society. For services to Agriculture.
- John Peter Bulgari, Higher Mapping and Charting Officer, Ministry of Defence.
- Christopher Evelyn Bunting. For services to Music.
- Robin Burley, lately Director, Edinvar Housing Association. For services to the Housing Association Movement in Scotland, particularly for Disabled People.
- Frank Burnet. For services to the Science on the Buses project.
- Julia Dalzie, Mrs. Burns, Senior Community Dietician, Merthyr Tydfil. For services to Health Care.
- Lieutenant Colonel Keith Robert Burridge. For services to the Tinsley House Immigration Detention Centre.
- Hazel Elizabeth, Mrs. Busby. For services to Community Relations.
- Miss Rachel Yvonne Butler, Personal Secretary, Home Office.
- Robert Butterfield, Paintshop/Bodyshop Supervisor, Wallace Arnold Coaches Ltd. For services to the Transport Industry.
- Julie, Mrs. Cadd, Commercial Assistant, BAe. For services to the Aerospace Industry and to Charity.
- William Caldwell, Dairy Stockman, Ayrshire. For services to Agriculture.
- Edith Brenda, Mrs. Callaghan. For services to Prison Welfare and to the community.
- David Campbell, Compliance Employer Officer, H.M. Board of Inland Revenue.
- Ms Jane Susan Campbell, Co-Director, National Centre for Independent Living. For services to Disabled People.
- Murdo Ross Campbell, Pipefitter/Plumber, Marconi Marine (YSL). For services to the Defence Industry.
- Valerie, Mrs. Cann, Front Line Manager, H.M. Board of Inland Revenue.
- Margaret, Mrs. Carouth. For services to St Helena Hospice, Colchester, Essex.
- Miss Myra Yvonne Carroll, Finance Officer, Scottish Area. For services to the British Transport Police.
- Sheila, Mrs. Carroll, lately Jobcentre Manager, Employment Service, Department for Education and Employment.
- Elizabeth, Mrs. Casson. For services to the community, especially Elderly People, in Patchway, Bristol.
- Donna, Mrs. Chaloner. For services to Wound Care.
- Charles Robert Chandler. For charitable services to Rotary International and to the Cancer Research Campaign in Torquay, Devon.
- Hambia Irene, Mrs. Christoforou, Head of Art and Design, Sion Manning School, Kensington and Chelsea, London. For services to Art Education.
- Eric Clark. For services to British Exports to Africa.
- Isabel, Mrs. Clark. For charitable services to the community, especially the Royal National Lifeboat Institution, in Milnthorpe, Cumbria.
- Kenneth Clark. For services to the Soldiers', Sailors' and Airmen's Families Association in London.
- Sylvia Adassa, Mrs. Clarke. For services to Fostering in Leicester.
- Margaret Ann, Mrs. Clubb, J.P. For services to the Citizens' Advice Bureau in Colchester, Essex.
- Joan, Mrs. Coleman, Special Educational Needs Co-ordinator, Harry Cheshire High School, Worcestershire. For services to Education.
- Alma, Mrs. Collin. For services to Sport for People with Disabilities in Middlesbrough, Cleveland.
- Anne Abbot, Mrs. Combe, Teacher, Starley Hall School, Fife. For services to Pupils with Special Educational Needs.
- Roland Cooper, Support Grade Band 1, Government Office for the East Midlands. Department of the Environment, Transport and the Regions.
- Miss Beryl Coulam. For services to Elderly and Disabled People in Marple, Cheshire.
- Everton Counsell, Peabody Community Fund Manager, Peabody Trust. For services to the Millennium Awards Scheme.
- Alison, Mrs. Cox. For services to Education for Disabled People.
- Pauline, Mrs. Craven, Support Grade Band 1, Ministry of Defence.
- James Leo Creery. For services to Economic Regeneration.
- Joan May, Mrs. Cresswell, lately B1, Cabinet Office. Richard Charles C, Area Manager, Environment Agency, Northumbria. For services to Environmental Protection.
- Christopher Roy Croft. For services to Visually Impaired People.
- Bernard John Cunningham. For services to Local Government and to the community in Torfaen, South East Wales.
- Mark Terence Daly, Control Room Manager, H.M. Board of Customs and Excise.
- Brian Daniels, Millennium Volunteer. For services to Young People in Somerset.
- Doris Elizabeth, Mrs. Darby, Administrative Officer, Department of Social Security.
- Roger John Darcy, Chairman, Dockyard Works Committee. Devonport Management Ltd. For services to the Defence Industry.
- Archibald Davies. For services to the Southampton Police Club, Hampshire Constabulary.
- Brian Davies, Inspector, Remploy. For services to the Employment of Disabled People in Wigan, Greater Manchester.
- Guinette Marie, Mrs. Davies. For services to Work- Injured and Disabled Nurses.
- Mary, Mrs. Davies. For services to the WRVS and to the community in Paisley, Renfrewshire.
- Liz, Mrs. Dawn, Actress. For services to the Manchester Children's Hospital, the Genesis Appeal and the Liz Dawn Breast Cancer Appeal, St. James's Hospital, Leeds.
- Rosella, Mrs. Dawson, lately MPB6m Employment Service, Department for Education and Employment.
- Philip Thomas Deakin. For services to the community, especially the Alnwick Civic Society, in Northumberland.
- Roger Wallace Denley, Station Officer (Retained), Cornwall County Fire Brigade. For services to the Fire Service and to the community.
- Eric Dickinson, J.P. For services to the Board of Visitors, HM Prison Liverpool.
- Irene, Mrs. Dilger, Programme Leader, Stafford College, Staffordshire. For services to Education.
- Susan J. B., Mrs. Doggett. For services to the Blackdown Support Group, Devon.
- Lonnie (Anthony James) Donegan, Musician. For services to Popular Music.
- Robert Reginald Donnan, Station Warden, Ministry of Defence.
- Mervyn Douglas. For services to Scouting.
- Ann Gillies, Mrs. Draper. For services to the Gaelic Language and to the Royal National Mod.
- Audrey, Mrs. Drew, Corporate Community Affairs Manager, Severn Trent plc. For services to Community Projects and WaterAid.
- Derek Colin Thomas Drew. For public service.
- Edwina Olive, Mrs. Drew. For services to the community, especially people with Learning Disabilities, in South Wales.
- Jean Bennie, Mrs. Dunlop. For services to the community in Ballantrae, Ayrshire.
- Daphne Blundell, Mrs. Dunstan. For services to the community, especially the Royal Society for the Protection of Birds, in Solihull, West Midlands.
- James William Easton. For services to the Sheep Dog Society.
- Miss Muriel Edgar. For services to the community in Springholm, Castle Douglas, Kirkcudbright.
- David Elder, Corporate Services and Facilities Manager, Fife Health Board. For services to the NHS in Scotland.
- Dorothy Mary, Mrs. Eldridge, President, Portsmouth and Southsea Ladies' Lifeboat Guild. For services to the RNLI.
- Geoffrey Eldridge, Administrative Officer, Department of Social Security.
- Richard Emanuel, Founder, DX Communications. For services to the Telecommunications Industry.
- Dilys, Mrs. Emery, lately Compliance Inspector, H.M. Board of Inland Revenue.
- Stephen Emms. For services to the British Red Cross Society in Northumbria.
- Irene, Mrs. Evans. For services to Disabled People in Delyn and Deeside, North Wales.
- John Derek Evans. For services to Brailsford Ploughing and Hedging Society, Derbyshire.
- John Stewart Evans. For public service.
- Molly, Mrs. Evans. For services to the community in Lambeth, London.
- Frank Everett. For services to the Sea Cadet Corps on Guernsey.
- Michael John Eynon, Mechanic, Angle Lifeboat RNLI. For services to Maritime Safety.
- Sandra Susan, Mrs. Fairbank, lately Head, Department of Community Studies, Chichester College of Art, Science and Technology, West Sussex. For services to Further Education.
- Garry Frank Fawcett, Consulting Engineer, Wilson Consultants. For services to Fairground and Amusement Park Health and Safety.
- Gillian, Mrs. Fellows, Chair, Beechdale Community Housing Association. For services to Housing in Walsall, West Midlands.
- James Miskimmin Ferguson. For services to the Burma Star Association.
- John Ferguson, J.P., Chairman, Parkhead Housing Association. For services to the Housing Association Movement in Scotland.
- Carole Ann, Mrs. Field, Guest House Proprietor. For services to Tourism in Beadnell, Northumberland.
- Miss Joy Field, Clinical Nurse Specialist (Nutrition), Queen's Medical Centre, Nottingham. For services to Nursing.
- Gwyn Fieldhouse. For services to the Royal British Legion in Wales.
- Dennis Fink, Docklands Manager, British Waterways. For services to London's Docklands.
- Kathleen Ada, Mrs. Fishwick, Chairman, National Council of Civic Trust Societies. For services to Civic Heritage in Lancashire.
- Michael James Fitzpatrick, lately Vice Chairman, Polaroid (UK) Ltd and Chairman, Lomond Enterprise Partners. For services to Enterprise in Dunbartonshire.
- George James Fleming, Senior Mortuary Technician. For services to the NHS.
- David Alan Ford, Chief of Castings Technology, Rolls- Royce Plc. For services to the Aerospace Industry.
- James Michael Fordham. For services to the MRC Laboratory of Molecular Biology.
- Jane, Mrs. Fraser, Chief Executive, Fraser Security. For services to the Security Industry.
- Iris, Mrs. French. For services to the community, especially the 999 Club, in Deptford, London.
- Roger Barstow Frost, Member, Briercliffe Parish Council, Lancashire. For services to the community.
- Lieutenant Colonel Gerald Stanley Furtado. For services to the community, especially as a School Governor, in Chipping Campden, Gloucestershire.
- Hubert Gabbie. For services to the Pig Industry.
- Valerie,
- Valerie, Mrs. Wood-Gaiger. For services to the Countrywide Workshops Charitable Trust.
- R. Wallace Galbraith. For services to Ayrshire Fiddle Orchestra.
- Susan, Mrs. Gallagher, Bursar, Pear Tree Special School, Kirkham, Lancashire. For services to Children with Special Educational Needs.
- Peter Richard Gandy, Support Grade Band 1, Department for Education and Employment.
- Leonard Ganley, Referee. For services to Snooker.
- Marie Patricia, Mrs. Gardner. For services to Fostering in Leeds.
- Timothy Gardom, Content Editor, Body and Faith Zones. For services to the Millennium Dome.
- Clare Gerada, General Medical Practitioner, London. For services to Medicine and to Drug Misusers.
- Colin Gibson. For services to the community in Ollerton, Nottinghamshire.
- Geoffrey Burn Gibson. For services to the community, especially the Royal British Legion, in Quorn, Leicestershire.
- John Gibson, Shop Steward, Leyland and Birmingham Rubber Company. For services to Energy Efficiency in the Workplace.
- James Hawke Gill, Inspector, Lothian and Borders Police. For services to the Police and to the Borders Cot Death Action Group.
- Albert Gillespie, Toastmaster. For services to the Community.
- George Gomersal. For services to the community in Drighlington, West Yorkshire.
- John Derek Goodhead. For services to Animal Welfare in Birmingham.
- John Edwin Goodwin. For services to Scouting in East Sussex.
- Antoinette, Mrs. Gordon. For services to the Royal Society for the Encouragement of the Arts, Manufacturers and Commerce.
- June Evelyn, Mrs. Gower. For services to the community, especially Elderly People, in Caldecott, Leicestershire.
- Ivan Grainger, Higher Executive Officer, Department of Social Security.
- Miss Barbara Granger. For services to the Nottingham Probation Service.
- James Stewart Smith Gray, Superintendent, Spey District Salmon Fishery Board. For services to Salmon Management and Conservation.
- John Christian Swinfen-Green. For services to Heart Patients.
- Ethel Jane, Mrs. Gregg. For services to Prisoner Welfare.
- Frances, Mrs. Groombridge, Home Help. For services to the community in the City of London.
- Ann Wendy, Mrs. Guest, Chairperson, Wolverhampton Federation of Tenants. For services to the community in Spring Valley.
- Elizabeth, Mrs. Guha, Human Resources and Equal Opportunities Manager, East Lancashire Training and Enterprise Council. For services to Equal Opportunities.
- Miss Elizabeth Lorna Gunn, Registrar and Sub-Postmistress, Latheron, Caithness. For services to the Registration Service.
- Jeremy Clayton Guscott. For services to Rugby Union Football.
- Miss Rosemary Susan Hails. For services to Environmental Research.
- Marie Elizabeth, Mrs. Halcrow, lately Office Manager, H.M. Treasury.
- Miss Penelope Anne Hale. For services to Physiotherapy for Disabled Children.
- Miss Marie-Therese Hall. For services to Archaeology in Yorkshire.
- Roger Granville Hall, Sub Officer (Retained) Hereford and Worcester Fire and Rescue Service. For services to the Fire Service.
- Gordon Allan Halls, Vice President, Derby Diocesan Association of Church Bellringers. For services to Campanology in Derbyshire.
- Catherine Philomena, Mrs. Hammond, Chairman, League of Friends of Guildford Hospitals. For services to Health Care.
- Linda Molly, Mrs. Hammond, Impex Officer, H.M. Board of Customs and Excise.
- Maureen, Mrs. Hammond, Administrative Officer, Ministry of Defence.
- Roy Handley, Member, Sandwell Metropolitan Borough Council. For services to the community in the West Midlands.
- Jean Laura, Mrs. Hannam, Headteacher, Bodnant Infants School, Prestatyn, North Wales. For services to Education.
- Francis Brown Hanson. For services to the Spalding Horticultural Society Ltd, Lincolnshire.
- Anne, Mrs. Harper, Personal Assistant to the Chief Executive, Alnwick District Council, Northumberland. For services to the community.
- Robert Sidney Harris, Space Engineer. For services to the recovery of the SOHO Mission.
- Miss Patricia Harrison, lately Duty Officer, Ministry of Agriculture, Fisheries and Food.
- Robert Alfred Hartley, Flight Development Team Manager, BAe. For services to the Defence Industry.
- Masood Ul Hasnain, Founder, Haani Cables Ltd. For services to Manufacturing and to Employment in Hartlepool, Teesside.
- Sylvia Mary, Mrs. Hatchell, J.P. For services to the community, particularly the WRVS, on Merseyside.
- Reginald Hayward. For services to the Dunstable and District Handicapped Persons Typing Club, Bedfordshire.
- Rosamond, Mrs. Hayward. For services to the Dunstable and District Handicapped Persons Typing Club, Bedfordshire.
- Edward Healy, lately Governor 3, HM Prison Garth, Prison Service, Home Office.
- Ben Helfgott. For services to Community Relations.
- John Laurence Henderson, lately Water Treatment Operative. For services to Water Treatment Services in the Shetland Islands.
- Elizabeth Ann, Mrs. Herring. For services to Lothian Cat Rescue.
- John Ernest Hibberd, Town Crier. For services to the community in Southampton, Hampshire.
- Robert James Higginbotham, Regional Co-ordinator, Institute of Advanced Motorists. For services to Road Safety in North West England.
- Loleita, Mrs. Higgins, Police Constable, Staffordshire Police. For services to the Police and to Community Relations.
- Cherry, Mrs. Hill. For services to Model Engineering.
- Kevin Hill, Musical Director, Haverhill Sinfonia. For services to Music.
- Marcus Anthony Hill. For services to the community in Staining, Lancashire.
- Roland Hilton. For services to the Citizens' Advice Bureau and to the community in Drumchapel, Glasgow.
- Gordon Terence Hipkiss. For services to the New Deal in Doncaster, South Yorkshire.
- Diana Margaret, Mrs. Hodgins, Managing Director, European Technology for Business Ltd. For services to Small and Medium Enterprises in the East of England.
- Phillip Dempster Adamson Holden. For services to the Animal Health Distributors' Association.
- John Ralph Wykeham Hollins, Member, Hampshire Wildlife Trust. For services to Wildlife Conservation.
- Janet Noble, Mrs. Home, J.P. For services to the community in Inverness.
- Molly Evelyn, Mrs. Hooker, Governor and Classroom Helper, St Nicholas CE School, Cottesmore, Rutland. For services to Education.
- The Reverend Geoffrey Hooper, Director, Mansfield Settlement. For services to the community in Newham, London.
- David George Horwood, Legal and Corporate Manager, Environment Agency. For services to the Environment.
- Brian John Howard, Executive Director, Tripscope. For services to Transport for Disabled People.
- Sheilagh, Mrs. Howe. For services to the community, especially Bankwood Primary School, in Gleadless Valley, Sheffield
- Christopher Edward Howell, lately Forward Planning Director, Corporation of London. For services to Local Government.
- Miss Jennifer Lilian Howells, Head Teacher, Palmerston Primary School, Barry, South Wales. For services to Education.
- William John Hudson. For services to Health and Safety in Agriculture and in Rural Communities.
- Captain Geoffrey Huggett R.N. (Retd). For services to the King George's Fund for Sailors in East Anglia.
- David Stewart Hughes. For service to the Fire Service.
- Mrs Doris Hughes. For services to War Widows' Association.
- William Alun Hughes. For services to the community in Beddgelert, Gwynedd.
- Alan John Hunt, Submarine Operations Manager, Devonport Management Ltd. For services to the Defence Industry.
- Mrs Wendy Hurford, Headteacher. For services to Education on Jersey.
- Peter Irvine. For services to Edinburgh's Hogmanay Festival.
- Jawaid Mohammed Ishaq. For services to Community Relations in South Humberside and North Lincolnshire.
- Zia-Ul Islam, Project Organiser, St. James Community and Advice Centre, Birmingham. For services to the community and to Interfaith Relations.
- Henry Jackson. For services to the community, especially the Old Kiln Museum, in Tilford, Surrey.
- Mrs Margaret Joyce Jackson. For services to the community, especially the Old Kiln Museum, in Tilford, Surrey.
- Miss Marjorie Jackson, Higher Executive Officer, Ministry of Defence.
- Stanley Leonard Jarvis. For services to the Citizens' Advice Bureau in Barking and Dagenham, Essex.
- Michael Jenkins, Senior Supervising Engineer, Jubilee Line Extension. For services to London Underground.
- Geoffrey Dawson Jennett. For services to Schools' Association Football.
- Miss Brenda Margaret Jennison. For services to Physics Education.
- Erik Indergaard Jespersen, General Medical Practitioner, Lorn Medical Centre, Oban. For services to General Practice.
- Jeffrey Johnson. For services to the Millennium in West Yorkshire.
- Kieran Comyn Johnston. For services to Vulnerable People.
- Matthew Johnston. For services to the Fire Service.
- Mrs. Angela Jones, Higher Executive Officer, Department of Social Security.
- Mrs. Edna Jones. For services to Cefn Coed Hospital League of Friends and to the community in Swansea.
- Gerald Daniel Ponton Jones. For services to the Ex-Services Mental Welfare Society in Surrey.
- Mrs. Glenys Jones. For services to Swimming and Life Saving in South East Wales.
- Mrs. Glenys Sheila Jones. For services to the Landing Craft Gun and Flak Association in Pembrokeshire.
- John Wayne Jones, Divisional Commandant, South Wales Special Constabulary. For services to the Police.
- Leonard Arthur Jones. For charitable services to the community, especially the Southend Athletic Club, in Bognor Regis, West Sussex.
- Orville Jones, J.P. For services to Swimming and Life Saving in South East Wales.
- Trevor Owen Jones, Veterinary Investigation Officer, Ministry of Agriculture, Fisheries and Food.
- Dilip Kumar Joshi, Area Business Manager, Thames Trains, Ealing Broadway. For services to the Railway Industry.
- Mrs. Margaret Joyce. For services to Social Security and Disability Appeal Tribunals.
- Mrs. Mavis Keir, Member, Berwickshire Association for Voluntary Service. For services to the community in Berwickshire.
- Eric Kelsall. For services to Scouting in Birmingham.
- John James Keown, Greengrocer and Florist. For services to the community on the Isle of Man.
- Shaz Khan, Sales and Marketing Director, Kensal Ltd. For services to Business.
- Mrs. Kathleen, Kiddle, Post Mistress. For services to the Post Office and to the community in Garveston, Norfolk.
- Mrs. Valerie Kilner. For services to Childcare.
- Mrs. Patricia Kinchin. For services to the community in Harefield, Middlesex.
- Mrs. Catherine King. For public service.
- Mrs. Mavis Enid King. For services to the community, in South East London, Kent, and Atworth, Wiltshire.
- Peter Stephen George King, Proprietor, Ronnie Scott's. For services to Jazz Music.
- Norman Kirk. For services to the community, especially the Goole Town Cricket Club, in Goole, East Yorkshire.
- Mrs. Phoebe Florence Norris-Kirk. For services to the community, especially Town Twinning, in association with Kingsley Hall, Dagenham.
- Robert Kirkpatrick, Agricultural Craftsman, H.M. Prison Ashwell, Prison Service, Home Office.
- Kenneth Kite, Senior Lecturer in Chemistry, University of Exeter. For services to Higher Education.
- Billy Kar Chi Ko, J.P. For services to Mental Health Services for Chinese People.
- Malur Lakshmana Hemantha Kumar, General Medical Practitioner, Slough. For services to Medicine in Berkshire.
- Mrs. Esme Lancaster. For services to the community in Handsworth, Birmingham.
- John Lancaster, Head of Nursing and Professional Development, NHS Executive, Department of Health.
- Mrs. Fay Lilian Landau. For services to the Solicitors' Benevolent Association.
- Paul Lawrie. For services to Golf.
- Max Lea. For services to the Old Boys of the Cambridge and Bethnal Green Boys' Club, London and for services to Association Football.
- Miss Jane Ledger. For services to Guiding and to Brownies in Beverley, East Yorkshire.
- Mrs. Diana Elizabeth Legg, Usher Manager, Central London County Court, Lord Chancellors Department.
- Juris Leimanis, Purchasing Manager, GEM Engineering Ltd. For services to the Clay Industry and to the community in Wrexham, North Wales.
- Mrs. Alison Leslie, Administrative Officer, Department of Social Security.
- Mrs. Ann, Mrs Lindsay, Public Relations Manager, Remploy. For services to the employment for Disabled People in Leicester.
- Miss Anna Link. For services to the Royal Society/British Association Millennium Award Scheme.
- Robert Lloyd. For services to Association Football in North Wales.
- John Vincent Lobb, Intelligence Officer, H.M. Board of Customs and Excise.
- Mrs. Eileen Mary Lockett. For services to the Cancer Research Campaign in London.
- Miss Susan Melody Lopez. For services to Women's Association Football.
- Mrs. Joan Lowe. For services to the King George's Fund for Sailors in Scotland.
- Reginald Lowman. For services to the community, especially the League of Friends of Southampton General Hospital in Hampshire.
- Anthony James Lucas, Station Warden, Ministry of Defence.
- Kenneth Edwin Ludlow. For services to the community in Winterslow, Wiltshire.
- Robert Norman Keith Lynch. For services to the Police.
- Mrs. Gladys MacCabe, Painter. For services to the Arts.
- Miss Christina Ann MacDonald, Headteacher, Laxdale Primary School. For services to Education.
- Gavin Clifford MacKay, Senior Professional and Technology Officer, Defence Evaluation and Research Agency, Ministry of Defence.
- John Stewart MacKay. For services to the community in Pitlochry, Dundee.
- William James Ross MacKay. For services to the Post Office and to the community in North Scotland.
- Henry Gordon Mackenzie. For services to Businesses in Nottingham.
- Sarah Campbell, Mrs. MacKinnon, Station Cook, Ardrossan Fire Station, Ayrshire. For services to the Fire Service.
- Douglas Stewart Mackintosh, Chief, Camanachd Association. For services to Shinty.
- George Alexander MacRae, Harbour Clerk. For services to the community in Fraserburgh, Aberdeenshire.
- Paula Mary, Mrs. Mahon. For services to Rural Regeneration.
- June Margaret, Mrs. Maidens. For services to the community in Atherstone, Warwickshire.
- Tamara, Mrs. Malcolm, Director, Theatre Chipping Norton. For services to the Arts in Oxfordshire.
- Laurence Mann. For services to the community, especially Young People, in Skelmanthorpe, West Yorkshire.
- James Manson, lately Station Honorary Secretary, Troon Lifeboat, Ayrshire. For services to Maritime Safety.
- Joyce, Mrs. Marr, School Secretary, Johnshaven Primary School, Kincardine. For services to Education and to the community.
- Anthony Graeme de Bracey Marrs. For services to Export to the Caribbean.
- Mrs Marjorie Marsden. For services to the Good Hope NHS Trust.
- James Albert Marshall. For services to Rochdale Heartbeat, Lancashire.
- Louise, Mrs. Martin. For services to the Retired and Senior Volunteer Programme.
- Marlene Valerie, Mrs. Matthews, Learning Support Assistant, Kings Hedges School, Cambridge. For services to Children with Special Needs.
- Anna Marie, Mrs. McAlister, Teacher, Sladefield Infant School, Birmingham. For services to Education.
- Jamieson McArthur, lately Movements Manager, H.M. Prison Shotts, Scottish Prison Service, Scottish Executive.
- Alexander McClintock. For services to Youth Sport, particularly Association Football, in Glasgow.
- Margaret Cameron McCombe, Mrs. McDonald. For services to the Stafford Hospitals League of Friends.
- Miss Margaret McEleny. For services to Disabled Swimming.
- Ellen Amelia, Mrs. McGrath. For services to the community in Tameside and Denton, Manchester.
- Hugh Gerard John McKay. For services to the Soldiers', Sailors' and Airmen's Families Association in Central Scotland.
- Linda, Mrs. McKay, Chair, Police (Scotland) Examinations Committee. For services to the Scottish Police College.
- Frances Hulskramer, Mrs. McLaren, Honours Secretary, Scottish Executive.
- Jean, Mrs. McLaren, lately Support Manager 2, Home Office.
- John McLure, Janitor, Kirkcaldy High School, Fife. For services to Pupil Welfare.
- Miss Anna May McMullan. For services to the Police.
- Mrs Helen McSevney. For services to the Drumchapel Credit Union, Glasgow.
- John Frederick Meace. For services to the Fire Brigades National Benevolent Fund.
- John Meadley. For services to British Executive Services Overseas.
- Robert Arthur Patrick Mellor, Trustee, Royal Society for the Prevention of Accidents. For services to Health and Safety.
- John Thomas Mendus, Senior Business Adviser, Severn Trent Water. For services to the community in Solihull, West Midlands.
- Jeffrey Edward Merrett, Detective Constable, Devon and Cornwall Constabulary. For services to the Police community.
- Douglas Cecil Merriman. For services to the Board of Visitors, H.M. Prison The Mount.
- Colin Peter Metcalfe, Governor. Roundwood Park School, Hertfordshire. For services to Education.
- Julian Edward Metcalfe, Co-Chairman, Pret a Manger. For services to the Catering Industry.
- Elizabeth Margaret, Mrs. Middleton. For services to Music and the community in Cleveland.
- Linda Rose Middleton, D.L., Member, Leeds City Council. For services to Women and to Public Transport in Leeds.
- Kenneth Mills, Senior Professional and Technology Officer, Ministry of Defence.
- Richards Mills. For services to Amateur Drama.
- Jack Milroy. For services to Entertainment.
- John Walton Miskelly, lately Area Secretary, Aberdeen and Kincardine Area, National Farmers' Union of Scotland. For services to Agriculture.
- Diana, Mrs. Mitchell. For services to the Abbeyfield Society in Solihull, West Midlands.
- Joseph Mitty. For services to OXFAM and to the Development of Charity Shops.
- Irene Joyce, Mrs. Money. For services to the community in Edmonton, London.
- Miss Pauline Sylvia Monro. For services to Neurology in the former Soviet Union.
- John Montgomery. For services to the British Diabetic Association.
- Mrs Helen Elizabeth Moody, Local Officer 2, Department of Social Security.
- Michael Edward Jones Morgans. For services to the Welsh Blood Service and to St John's Ambulance.
- Louise Margaret, Mrs. Morison, Driving Examiner, Driving Standards Agency, Department of the Environment, Transport and the Regions.
- The Reverend David Morris, Director, The Community of Grace. For services to Homeless People in Leicester.
- Brenda Rosemary, Mrs. Mortimer. For services to Biosciences Research Administration.
- David Moyes, Assistant Principal, Anniesland College, Dunbartonshire. For services to Further Education.
- Miss Elizabeth Mary Moys. For services to Classification and Indexing.
- Christine Janet MacPherson, Mrs. Muir, lately Chairman, Children's Panel Advisory Committee, Orkney. For services to the Children's Hearings System.
- Evelyn, Mrs. Munson. For services to the British Red Cross Society in Derbyshire.
- Kay Sandra, Mrs. Murch, Site Manager, Greenwich Peninsula. For services to the Millennium Dome.
- Miss Fiona Murtagh. For services to Netball.
- Miss Eileen Mutter. For charitable services to the community, especially the Blood Transfusion Services and the British Red Cross Society, in Seaton, Devon.
- William Newby, President, Trevithick Trust. For services to Industrial Archeology.
- Professor Alan Francis Newell, Head, Department of Applied Computing, University of Dundee. For services to the development of IT and Communications Systems for Disabled People.
- Ms Dorothy Newton. For services to the Scarman Trust People's Millennium Awards Scheme.
- William Gordon Newton. For services to Willow Wood Hospice.
- Sin Hung Ng, Honorary Chairman, Newcastle Chinese School, Northumberland. For services to Education and to the community.
- Robert Geoffrey Nicholson. For services to the Gaming Board of Great Britain.
- Edward Noble. For services to Brass Band Music in West Yorkshire.
- Martin Noble. For services to the London Taxi Benevolent Association for War Disabled.
- Anne Ilingworth, Mrs. Norris, J.P. For services to the community, especially Education, in Westfield, Bexhill and Battle, East Sussex.
- Mary, Mrs. O’Brien. For services to Disabled People.
- Florence Audrey, Mrs. O’Connor. For services to the WRVS in Hampshire and Wiltshire.
- Mary Aileen, Mrs. O’Connor, Senior Nurse Manager, Ealing Hospital. For services to Accident and Emergency Nursing.
- Shirley May, Mrs. Orford, Personal Secretary, Ministry of Defence.
- Miss Katherine Betty Farquhar Orr. For services to the community.
- Janet Ann, Mrs. Palmer, Personal Assistant, H.M. Board of Inland Revenue.
- Batook Pandya. For services to Community Relations in Bristol.
- Kenneth George Parcell. For services to the League of Friends of Ealing Hospital NHS Trust.
- Miss Malinda Florence Muriel Parker. For services to Women's Bowls.
- Eric Parry, Member, BOD Modernisation Programme Implementation Team, H.M Board of Inland Revenue.
- Navin Chandra Patel, Higher Executive Officer, Ministry of Defence.
- Robert Gordon Paterson, Chair, Rail Committee, Merseyside Passenger Transport Authority. For services to Public Transport.
- Mrs. Eileen Patterson. For services to Community Relations.
- Mrs. Patricia Patterson. For services to Action Cancer.
- Frank Leonard Pawley, lately Regional Director (Turkey and the Middle East), Thames Water International. For services to the Water Industry.
- Margaret Elizabeth, Mrs. Payne. For services to the Administration of Justice in East Yorkshire.
- Stanley George Payne, Chairman, River Derwent Owners' Association. For services to Freshwater Fisheries in Cumbria.
- John Nigel Pearch. For services to the Boys' Brigade in Tyne and Wear.
- Joseph Joshua Pearlman. For services to the Ramblers' Association.
- Ann McGavin, Mrs. Pearson, Personal Secretary, Ministry of Defence.
- Joyce Edith, Mrs. Penlington. For services to the community in Oughtrington, Heatley and Lymm, Cheshire.
- Miss Lesley Ann Petherbridge, Clerk Telephonist, North Shields Jobcentre. For services to the Employment Service.
- James Peter Pettifar. For services to the Radley College Combined Cadet Force in Oxfordshire.
- David John Phillips, Chairman New Millennium Experience Advisory Group on Accessibility. For services to the Millennium Dome.
- Barry Philip Pierce, Principal Prison Officer, H.M. Young Offenders' Institution Stoke Heath, Prison Service, Home Office.
- Patricia Mary, Mrs. Pinnell. For services to Postgraduate Education for Dentists in Wales.
- Miss Christine Plant, Casework Support/Typist, H.M. Board of Inland Revenue.
- Ronald Power, Chairman, Brighton Philharmonic Orchestra. For services to the Arts in East Sussex.
- Kay, Mrs. Prior, Divisional Secretary, Department of the Environment, Transport and the Regions.
- Jeremy Hinton Pritlove, Mental Health Development Officer, Leeds City Council Social Services Department. For services to Mental Health.
- Derek William Prodger. For services to the South West Midlands War Pensions Committee.
- Joan Beverly, Mrs. Provost. For services to the community in Westminster, London.
- Surinder Singh Purewal, J.P. For services to the community in Southall, Middlesex.
- Robert Purkiss. For services to Improving Equality within Employment Relations.
- Roger Charles Putnam, Outdoor Adventure Instructor. For services to Sport.
- Sabiha, Mrs. Qureshi. For services to Community Relations, in Hounslow, Middlesex.
- Ghulam Rabbani. For services to Community Relations and to the Pakistani community in Glasgow.
- Miss Rose Mary Radford, Board Member, Trinity Centre, Birmingham. For services to Homeless People in Birmingham.
- Carole Ann, Mrs. Rafferty. For services to the Castle Vale Housing Action Trust, Birmingham.
- Jagdish Chander Rajput. For services to Community Relations in Harrow, London.
- Eileen Mary Ramsbottom, lately PB8, Employment Service, Department for Education and Employment.
- Stephen Bryan Rear, General Dental Practitioner. For services to Dentistry.
- Anthony Record, Chairman, National Britannia Ltd. For services to Industry and to the community in Caerphilly, South Wales.
- John Reilly. For services to the community in North Lanarkshire.
- Edna Florence, Mrs. Revill, lately Criminal Listing Officer, Lord Chancellor's Department.
- Colin Reynolds, lately Member, OFWAT's North West Customer Service Committee. For services to Water Customers.
- Miss Joyce Reynolds, Prison Officer, H.M. Prison Holloway, Prison Service, Home Office.
- Miss Wendy Richard, Actress. For services to Television Drama.
- Brian David Richards, lately Road Sweeper. For services to the Community in Whitchurch, Cardiff.
- Maureen, Mrs. Richards, Disability Development Officer, Living Options, Devon. For services to Disabled People in Exeter.
- Michael Albert Richardson, Inspector, Metropolitan Police Service. For services to the Police.
- Miss Prudence Mary Richardson, Executive Secretary, Loan Guarantee Scheme, Agricultural Credit Corporation. For services to the Farming Industry.
- Frank Noel Richley. For services to the Newspaper Press Fund.
- Michael Colin Rivers, Production Manager, AWE for services to the Defence Industry.
- James Atereo Roberts, Senior Security Guard, Lewisham College, London. For services to Further Education.
- James P. Robison, Vice Chairman, Lanarkshire Health Board. For services to the NHS in Scotland.
- Kathleen, Mrs. Robjohns, Principal Fire Control Officer, South Yorkshire Fire and Rescue Service. For services to the Fire Service.
- Francis Rose. For services to Field Botany and to Nature Conservation.
- Carmel, Mrs. Rosen. For services to Physiotherapy.
- Ian Ross. For services to the Environment and to the community in Doune and Deanston, Stirlingshire.
- David Ernest Rowlands, Operations Manager, Royal British Legion Industries. For services to the Employment of Disabled People.
- David Stanley McKay Russell. For services to the Police.
- Yvonne Kathleen, Mrs. Samuel, lately Higher Scientific Officer, Forestry Commission.
- Westley Edward Sandford, J.P. For services to the community in Colchester, Essex.
- Dinah May, Mrs. Sansome, Hostel Manager. For services to Young People and Ex-Offenders in Abertillery, Gwent.
- Terence Michael Scott, Chairman, Engineering Services Training Trust Ltd. For services to Training.
- David Charles Seaton. For services to Athletics.
- Peter Selman. For services to the Dynamic Earth Project.
- Heather Rosalind, Mrs. Semple. For services to the community.
- Margaret Bowie Weir, Mrs. Sharp, Headteacher, Head of Muir Primary School, Stirlingshire. For services to Education.
- Miss Penelope Anne Shepherd, Executive Director, UK Social Investment Forum. For services to Sustainable Economic Development and Socially Responsible Investment.
- Jennifer Jane, Mrs. Sherborne. For charitable service to the community in Hampshire, Wiltshire and Dorset.
- Ronald Brian Shields, Member, East Lindsey DistrictCouncil and Mablethorpe and Sutton Town Council. For services to Local Government and to the community in Lincolnshire.
- Barry Shiers. For services to Vision Twenty One in Cardiff.
- Anastasia, Mrs. Shillingford. For services to Community Relations in Newham, London.
- Miss Marion Shirras. For services to the Post Office and to the community in Reymerston, Norfolk.
- Kathleen, Mrs. Silver, Clerical Officer, Highland Primary Care NHS Trust. For services to the NHS in Scotland.
- Stanley Simons. For services to the community in Weobley, Herefordshire.
- Richard Michael Skelton, Principal Doorkeeper, House of Lords.
- Alan Victor Skinner, Principal, Adult Community College, Colchester, Essex. For services to Adult Education.
- Barbara Kathleen, Mrs. Skinner. For services to the community in Northamptonshire.
- Anthony Slater, Member, The New Bridge. For services to Prisoner Welfare in Middlesex.
- Vivienne Marina, Mrs. Slater, lately Ancillary Helper, William Harris Special School, Lincolnshire. For services to Children with Special Needs.
- George Robin Sleight, Director of Business Strategy, BAe Systems. For services to the Defence Industry.
- Florence Marion Morrison, Mrs. Sloan. For services to Young People.
- Miss Barbara Ann Smith, Executive Officer, Department of Social Security.
- Betty, Mrs. Smith. For services to the community in Pylle, Somerset.
- Gerald Stephen Hillier Smith, Chairman, Friends of Nonsuch Park. For services to the community in North Cheam, Surrey.
- John Kenneth Smith, Senior Ecological Adviser, ICI. For services to Nature Conservation and Sustainable Development.
- Judith Margaret, Mrs. Leslie-Smith. For services to the community especially the Kingsley Centre, near Bordon, Hampshire.
- John Henry Smyth. Scout Leader. For services to Scouting.
- Rita Gwendoline, Mrs. Southam, Catering Supervisor, Whatley Hall Hotel, Oxfordshire. For services to the Restaurant Trade.
- Miss Grace Helen Spencer. For services to the community in Ellistown, Leicestershire.
- Richard Spendlove. For services to Regional and Local Radio Broadcasting.
- Alexander Fraser Spowage, J.P. For charitable services to the community in Haddington, East Lothian.
- Christopher James Spray, Environment Director, Northumbrian Water. For services to Environmental Improvements and Conservation in the Water Industry in North East England.
- Alexander St. John. For services to National Federation of Retail Newsagents.
- Mark Anthony Stacey, Driving Examiner, Chesterfield Transport Ltd. For services to Road Safety.
- Patrick George Stack, Senior Teacher, Sedgehill School, Lewisham, London. For services to Education.
- Janet Margaret, Mrs. Sterry. For services to the WRVS in Luton, Bedfordshire.
- Iris Selina, Mrs. Stewart, Governor, George Green's School, Tower Hamlets, London. For services to Education.
- Jean Edith, Mrs. Stewart, Patient Affairs Officer, Newham Healthcare NHS Trust. For services to the NHS.
- Pamela Christine, Mrs. Stewart, Lecturer, Halesowen College, West Midlands. For services to Further Education.
- Patrick Loudon McIain Stewart, D.L., Secretary, Clyde Fishermen's Association. For services to the Scottish Fishing Industry.
- Nigel Charles Stockdale, Chief Immigration Officer, UK Immigration Service, Home Office.
- Alan Geoffrey Stockwell, Owner, Stockwell Puppet Theatre. For services to Education in North East England.
- Miss Christine Stones, Project Leader, Barnardo's Neighbourhood Family Centre. For services to Children's Families and to Partnership.
- Elizabeth Joan, Mrs. Austin-Strange, Director, Fosbrooks Traditional Dance and Music Centre. For services to the community in Stockport, Cheshire.
- John William Stratton, Senior Telecommunications Technical Officer, Ministry of Defence.
- Elizabeth Grace, Mrs. Stretch. For services to the community in Ruthin North East Wales.
- Samuel Dennis Stringer. For services to the community, especially the Eastbourne Blind Society, in Eastbourne, East Sussex.
- Miss Ingrid Surgenor, Accompanist. For services to Music.
- Rodney John Surman. For services to Victim Support in London.
- Albert Reid Sutherland, Coxswain, Fraserburgh Lifeboat, Aberdeenshire. For services to Maritime Safety.
- Mary De Hebden, Mrs. Sutherland. For services to the community, especially Disabled People, in Totnes, Devon.
- William Robert Sutherland. For services to the community in Golspie, Sutherland.
- Sara Swann, Project Leader, Barnardo's. For services to Child Welfare.
- Maureen, Mrs. Taggart. For services to Industrial Relations.
- Marjorie Vera, Mrs. Taplin, Administrative Officer, Highways Agency, Department of the Environment, Transport and the Regions.
- Jagjit Singh Taunque. For service to Community Relations, in Birmingham, West Midlands.
- Miss Clare Taylor. For services to Cricket, Association Football and to Hockey.
- John Robert George Taylor. For services to Radio Broadcasting in Norfolk.
- John Spencer Taylor, Chairman, Todmorden Information Centre Trust. For services to the community in Todmorden, Lancashire.
- Suzanne Iris Margaret, Mrs. Taylor, Clinical Nurse Specialist in HIV/AIDS. For services to Nursing.
- John Taylorson. For charitable services, especially the Great Yorkshire Bike Ride, in Wetherby, North Yorkshire.
- Alan Frederick Thomas, lately Senior Press Officer, National Assembly for Wales.
- David Hugh Thomas. For services to Voluntary Aided Education.
- Raymond William Thomas, National Standard Bearer. For services to the Royal British Legion.
- William Dennis Calvin-Thomas. For services to the community in Cardiff.
- Joan Mary, Mrs. Thompson. For services to the community, especially the Martin House Children's Hospice, in Boston Spa, Wetherby, West Yorkshire.
- Lee Thompson. For services to the Friends of Dudley Group of Hospitals.
- Samuel Walter Thompson. For services to Crystal Glass Industry.
- Patricia Anne, Mrs. Thomson, Sister, Woodend Hospital, Aberdeen. For services to the Care of Elderly People.
- Robert James Thomson. For services to the St Andrew's Ambulance Association in Aberdeen.
- James Wesley Thorpe. For services to the community in Bedford, Bedfordshire.
- Eric Ronald Throssell. For services to Conservation of the Built Environment of Buckinghamshire.
- Linda Margaret, Mrs. Tolson. For services to the community, especially the Blackpool Grand Theatre Trust, in Blackpool, Lancashire.
- Mary, Lady Towneley. For services to improving Access to the Countryside.
- Jeffrey Harding Trembles, J.P. For services to the community, especially the Scout Association, in Blackpool, Lancashire.
- Alexander Troup. For services to the RAF Benevolent Fund in Aberdeenshire.
- Matthew William Tuck, Police Constable, Norfolk Constabulary. For services to the Police and to the community.
- Frederick Michael Tufnell, Senior Professional and Technology Officer, Defence Procurement Agency, Ministry of Defence.
- Elizabeth, Mrs. Turkington. For services to Shipping.
- Barry William Tyson. For services to Disabled People in Derby.
- James Undy, Band 3, Health and Safety Executive, Department of the Environment, Transport and the Regions.
- Michael John Vadden, Veterinary Surgeon. For services to the community in Benfleet, Essex.
- Miss Elizabeth Vann, Managing Director, Organix Brands Plc. For services to the Organic Food Industry.
- Ayesha, Mrs. Vernon. For services to Community Relations and Disability Equality.
- Annie, Mrs. Vincent, Revenue Assistant, H.M. Board of Inland Revenue.
- Carol, Mrs. Vorderman. For services to Broadcasting.
- Miss Olive Matilda Wakeham, President, Devon County Association for the Blind. For services to Visually Impaired People.
- Gaynor, Mrs. Waldin, District Nurse. For services to the community in Maesteg, South Wales.
- Charles Fraser Walker, Officer-in-Charge, Lockerbie Fire Station. For services to the Dumfries and Galloway Fire Brigade.
- Diana Dawn, Mrs. Walkerdine. For services to Hearing Impaired Children.
- Brenda Maureen, Mrs. Wa;lington. For services to Fostering in the London Borough of Bexley.
- Hugh Wallace. For services to the Police.
- John Henry Wallington, J.P. For services to the community in Southwark, London.
- Gerard Warren. For services to the Fire Service.
- Miss Margaret Warren, lately Supervisor, Department of Trade and Industry.
- Peter Leonard Warwick, Speaker's Trainbearer, House of Commons.
- Ann, Mrs. Watson. For services to Childcare.
- Ronald Brian Watson. For services to Christ Church College and to the community in Oxford.
- Alfred Thomas Webb. For services to the community in Kennington, London.
- Georgina Anna, Mrs. Webber, English Co-ordinator, Sacred Heart Primary School, Knowsley, Merseyside. For services to Education.
- Norman Cyril Welsford. For services to the community in Beaminster, Dorset.
- Glesni, Mrs. Whettleton, Head Teacher, Ysgol Y Wern School, Cardiff. For services to Education.
- Brenda Olive, Mrs. White. For services to the YWCA in Kirkcaldy, Fife.
- Christopher Edward White, Registered Safety Practitioner. For services to Health and Safety in the Construction Industry.
- Colin Robert White. For services to the Rehabilitation of Patients.
- Hilda, Mrs. White, Member. Thorn Court Residents' Association. For services to the community in Salford, Greater Manchester.
- Robin White. For services to the BBC World Service. William George W. For services to the community, especially the League of Friends at Royal Shrewsbury Hospital and the Scout Association, in Shrewsbury, Shropshire.
- Miss Mary Whitty, Administrative Officer, London School of Economics. For services to Education.
- Christopher Michael Garside Wildblood. For services to Architecture in Yorkshire.
- Paul Wilks, Senior Executive Officer, Department for Education and Employment.
- Christopher Willett, Head Messenger, Ministry of Defence.
- Edward Warren Williams. For services to the Millennium Experience.
- John Michael Williams, D.L. For services to the community, especially Business, in Cornwall.
- Nesta, Mrs. Williams, Secretary, Gobowen Hospital League of Friends. For services to the community in Corwen, North Wales.
- The Reverend Canon Anthony John Willis, Chaplain for Agriculture and Rural Life. For services to the agricultural community in Worcestershire.
- Gordon Tom Wills, Premises Manager, Moorfields Primary School, London. For services to Education and to the community.
- Arthur Wilson. For services to the Steeton Male Voice Choir, West Yorkshire.
- Georgina C., Mrs. Wilson. For services to District Nursing and to the community in Lanark.
- Henry Wilson. For services to the community.
- Mary Eleanor, Mrs. Wilson. For services to Carlisle Hospitals NHS Trust Volunteer Service.
- Molly, Mrs. Wilson. For services to Animal Welfare in South Wales.
- Bridget Elizabeth, Mrs. Winstanley, Chairman, Warwickshire Council for Voluntary Youth Services. For services to Young People.
- John Richard Wood, Vice President, Wey and Arun Canal Trust. For services to Canal Restoration and Conservation in West Sussex.
- Sydney Charles Wooderson. For services to the Blackheath Harriers and to Athletics.
- Steve Woodford. For services to the Timble Housing Organisation Leeds, West Yorkshire.
- Patricia Lindsay, Mrs. Woods. For services to the community in Poyntington, Dorset.
- Sheila Elizabeth, Mrs. Woodyatt, Member, of the Warrington Borough Council. For services to the community in Cheshire.
- Mary Elaine, Mrs. Woolcock, lately Customer Services Officer, H.M. Board of Inland Revenue.
- Frederic Max Wootton. For charitable services to the community, especially Barnardo's, in Suffolk.
- Diane Doreen, Mrs. Wright, School Crossing Patrol, Warwickshire County Council. For services to Road Safety.
- Ella, Mrs. Wright. For services to the Citizens' Advice Bureau in Durham.
- Frank William Wright, lately General Medical Practitioner, Sheffield. For services to Medicine in South Yorkshire.
- Jonathan Peter Wright. For services to Disabled People.
- Patricia, Mrs. Wright. For services to the community, especially Young People, In Cumbria and the Ukraine.
- Margaret Emma, Mrs. Yates. For services to the NHS in Lancashire.
- Geraldine Anne, Mrs. Young. For services to the community, especially Young People, in Enford, Wiltshire and in Romania.
- Miss Mary Ferguson Young. For services to the British Red Cross Society in Glasgow and Renfrewshire.

== Barbados ==
=== Knight Bachelor ===
- Charles Othniel Williams. For services to business, construction and sports.

=== The Most Excellent Order of the British Empire ===
==== Dame Commander of The Order of the British Empire (DBE) ====
- The Honourable Olga Patricia Symmonds. For services to education and public affairs.

==== Commander of The Order of the British Empire (CBE) ====
- Dr. John Mansfield Mayers. For public service.

==== Officer of The Order of the British Empire (OBE) ====
- Winfield Eugene Cummins. For services to policing.
- Dr. Dorothy Alexandra Cooke-Johnson. For establishing the Barbados Cancer Society.

== The Bahamas ==
=== The Most Distinguished Order of Saint Michael and Saint George ===
==== Companion of the Order of Saint Michael and Saint George (CMG) ====
- Eileen, Mrs. DUPUCH Carron. For services to the growth and development of The Bahamas.

=== The Most Excellent Order of the British Empire ===
==== Commander of The Order of the British Empire (CBE) ====
- Julian Wentworth Francis. For services to the growth and development of the finance industry.
- James Smith. For services to the growth and development of The Bahamas.

==== Officer of The Order of the British Empire (OBE) ====
- Miss Juanita Butler. For public service in the fields of education and business.
- The Reverend Dr. Simeon Bredford Hall. For service as a civic and religious leader.
- The Reverend Garnet King. For service in the field of religion.
- Sister Annie Thompson. For service to religion and education.

==== Member of The Order of the British Empire (MBE) ====
- Percival Archer. For services to the growth and development of The Bahamas.
- Theophilus Farquarson. For service to the construction industry.
- Lawrence Glinton. For services to the growth and development of The Bahamas.

== Grenada ==
=== The Most Excellent Order of the British Empire ===
==== Commander of The Order of the British Empire (CBE) ====
Habib Elias Hadeed. For services to business and the community.

==== Officer of The Order of the British Empire (OBE) ====
- Meryl Theresa, Mrs. Forsyth. For public service.

==== Member of The Order of the British Empire (MBE) ====
- Sydney Byron Ambrose. For community service.

=== British Empire Medal ===
- Lawrence Craymond Paryag. For services to agricultural development.

== Papua New Guinea ==
=== Knight Bachelor ===
- Justice Robert Kynnersley Woods, CBE. For services to law and the community

=== The Most Distinguished Order of Saint Michael and Saint George ===
==== Companion of the Order of Saint Michael and Saint George (CMG) ====
- Dr. Puka Temu. For public service.

=== The Most Excellent Order of the British Empire ===
==== Knight Commander of The Order of the British Empire (KBE) ====
- Leslie Wilson Johnson, CBE. For service to the people of Papua New Guinea
- Pato Kakaraya, CMG CBE. For services to politics and the community.

==== Commander of The Order of the British Empire (CBE) ====
Civil Division

- Sinake Giregire, M.B.E. – For services to the community.
- Leonard Wilson Kamit – For public service.

Military Division

- Brigadier General Carl Marlpo – For services to the Papua New Guinea Defence Force.

==== Officer of The Order of the British Empire (OBE) ====
- Suzanne Mary Darby – For services to the Papua New Guinea Red Cross and community service.
- Peter John Grimsha, M.B.E. – For services to tertiary education.
- Lari Ori Ivarapou – For service to the community.
- Kobale Kale – For service to the community.
- Mathias Karani, M.P. – For services to politics and the community.
- Simeon Moleambul Malai –For public service.
- The Right Reverend Bishop Anonga Pinigina – For service to the church and community.
- Patrick Rama – For service to the community and politics.
- Dr Jan Saave – For services to health and health education.
- Alphonse Saiho – For service to the church and community.

==== Member of The Order of the British Empire (MBE) ====
- Lyle Robert Agnew – For services to community development, sport and business promotion.
- Maria Apian – For service to the Health Department.
- Ivo Cappo – For service to the judiciary and community.
- Dr Paison Dakulala – For service to health and education.
- Chawari Taris Gimis – For services to the Health Department.
- Clive Hawkins – Community teacher.
- Joyce Ingirin – For service to the Health Department.
- James Isorua, B.E.M. – For community service.
- Bill Sharp Kua – For public service.
- Gavera Madaha, B.E.M. – For continued service to the Governor-General.
- Charles Kiet Patjole – For service during World War II and as a veteran.
- Moere Raikarawa – For service to religion.
- Jason Siew Ann Tan – For service to the community.
- Thomas Tumbungu – For services to government.

=== The Imperial Service Order ===
==== Companion of The Imperial Service Order (ISO) ====
- Ovia Rauka – For services to government.

=== British Service Medal ===
- Komape Au – For service to the Health Department.
- Margaret Aumbou – For services to the community.
- Willy Eiya – For promoting Papua New Guinea.
- Tau Harina – For services to the community.
- Augustine Koavea – For services to the community and teaching.
- Maria Koimo – For service to the Health Department.
- Llyod Packop Korup – For services to the community and teaching.
- Michael James Larmer – For services to the economy.
- Myroy Makel – For public service.
- Sergeant Robin Malum – For correctional service to the Papua New Guinea prison system.
- Margaret Mondo – For service to the Health Department.
- Batia Lega Oagi – For services during World War II and as a veteran.
- Maria Olipis – For service to the Health Department.
- Lorna Paumbari – For public service.
- Kari Dairi Pautani – For public service.
- Dorothy Ann Pomat – For public service.
- Corporal John Pominis – For correctional service to the Papua New Guinea prison system.
- Sergeant Dick Tambua – For service to policing.
- Maria Tauno – For service to the Health Department.
- Simon Temo – For service to the community.
- Tua Thomas – For service to the Health Department.
- Kapri Wambe – For service to the Health Department.
- Wusik Wapi – For service to the community.

Military Division

- Sergeant Michael Baime – For services to the Papua New Guinea Defence Force (Maritime).

==== Member of The Order of the British Empire (MBE) ====
- Major Gibere Abai – For services to the Papua New Guinea Defence Force.

=== Queen's Police Medal (QPM) ===
Military Division

- Chief Superintendent Raphael Huafolo, Royal Papua New Guinea Constabulary.
- Assistant Commissioner Jim Wan, Royal Papua New Guinea Constabulary.

== Tuvalu ==
=== The Most Excellent Order of the British Empire ===
==== Officer of The Order of the British Empire (OBE) ====
- Teagai Esekia. For public and community service.

==== Member of The Order of the British Empire (MBE) ====
- Moupa Fagalele. For services to the community.
- Meaurna Moeaga. For services to the community.
- Sakaio Sualau. For services to the public and private sector.

=== British Empire Medal ===
- Taeia Italeli. For services to the community.
- Sopoanga Sopoanga. For services to the community.
- Avia Temaolo. For services to the community.

== Saint Lucia ==
=== The Most Distinguished Order of Saint Michael and Saint George ===
==== Companion of the Order of Saint Michael and Saint George (CMG) ====
- Cornell Waldemar James Christopher Charles For services to business and commerce.

=== The Most Excellent Order of the British Empire ===
==== Dame Commander of The Order of the British Empire (DBE) ====
- [[Sesenne|Marie Selipha Sesenne, Mrs. Descartes BEM]]. For services to folk culture and art and to the community.

==== Officer of The Order of the British Empire (OBE) ====
- Michael Peter Bartlett. For service to St. Lucia.
- George Stanley Oliver Charles. For services to the armed forces, sports and to the community.

=== British Empire Medal ===
- Pius Bastien. For services to the community.
- Miss Lucy Honora-Gaspard. For services to the community.
- Augustus Obed Belmar Regis. For services to the community.

== Belize ==
=== The Most Distinguished Order of Saint Michael and Saint George ===
==== Knight Commander of The Order of Saint Michael and Saint George (KCMG) ====
- Michael Ashcroft. For public service to the community and country.

==== Member of The Order of Saint Michael and Saint George (MBE) ====
- Bridget, Mrs. Cullerton. For community service.
- Jose Jesus Montalvo. For community service.
