= George Castledine =

Nursing administrator and civil servant

George Castledine, FRCN (died 12 October 2018) was a British nursing educator and nursing consultant.

George Castledine won a scholarship to Oxford University, later attending Liverpool University. He worked as a staff nurse before relocating to the Manchester Royal Infirmary to be charge nurse in a trauma unit as well as lecturer. He was a Fellow of the Royal College of Nursing (RCN) from 1980.

Castledine moved to Wrexham, Wales, setting up the first nursing degree course linked to Cardiff Medical School: he established the Department of Nursing at the North East Wales Institute of Higher Education, now Glyndŵr University. He later moved to Birmingham as Assistant Dean and Professor of Nursing/Community Health at the University of Central England (now known as Birmingham City University).

George Castledine was knighted for his services to the health care profession in 2007, only the third male nurse ever to receive a knighthood. (The first was Graham Morgan in 2000, second Jonathan Asbridge 2006.)

== Misconduct and striking off ==
In 2011, Castledine was terminated as the chief executive of the Institute of Ageing and Health for allegedly having an improper sexual relationship with an 85-year-old patient. He was suspended by the Nursing and Midwifery Council for 18 months, pending the outcome of an investigation into the alleged misconduct.

In January 2014, after a lengthy hearing, the NMC Conduct and Competence Committee found that 11 of the 13 charges of misconduct laid against Castledine were proven and imposed a striking off order. As a result, his knighthood was annulled.

He died on 12 October 2018 at the age of 72.
