= Robin Wight (advertiser) =

President of The Engine Group

Robin Wight CVO CBE was president of The Engine Group ('Engine') from 2008-2019. He was a co-founder of the advertising agency WCRS, which he set up in 1979 and which merged to become Engine Creative in 2020. He also established the Ideas Foundation in 2001: a charity which mentors young people, aged 14–20, from disadvantaged backgrounds, nurturing their hidden creativity and helping them to build a pathway into the creative industries.

== Early life ==
Educated at Wellington College followed by St Catharine's College, Cambridge, Wight founded his first advertising agency whilst still an undergraduate at university. He left Cambridge before graduating to pursue a career in the advertising industry. He was described as "The Undergradman" by an article in The Guardian newspaper which led to his first job as a copywriter.

== Career ==
Wight was soon employed at the advertising agency Collett Dickenson Pearce, during which time, in 1966, he won the D&AD Copy Prize for the best-written campaign of the year. He then moved to Richard Cope and Partners, taking the job of Creative Director with his long-term Art Director, Max Forsythe. In 1979 he co-founded the agency Wight, Collins, Rutherford and Scott ('WCRS'). Wight was the creative force behind a number of groundbreaking campaigns for 118 118, Orange, Carling Black Label and BMW.

In 1984, Wight, Rutherford, Collins and Scott was the first advertising agency to go public on the AIM Stock Market and then used this position to acquire a network of agencies in both America, Asia and in Europe. Along the way, WCRS as it then became known, set up the Aegis Media Agency. WCRS was then sold by Aegis into the ownership of Havas in 1997 and Wight worked within the Havas owned WCRS for 14 successful years.

In 2004 he was part of the WCRS management team that led the buyout from parent company Havas Advertising. He was subsequently made joint chairman of WCRS under the new structure and then President of Engine in 2008. In 2010 Wight stood down from the board of Engine to focus on his charitable interests, though he remains President of the UK company.

== Charitable work ==
Wight has pursued many notable interests in addition to his work at WCRS and Engine. Between 1997 and 2002 he was Chairman of the Duke of Edinburgh Award's Charter for Business, a role for which he was appointed a Commander of the Royal Victorian Order (CVO) in the 2000 Birthday Honours. As chairman Wight helped to raise over £50million for the Duke of Edinburgh Award. From 1997 to 2006 he was chairman of Arts & Business, a charity that encourages Business to support the arts.

In 2003 Wight founded the Ideas Foundation, a charity that helps identify and nurture creatively gifted young people, primarily from ethnic minority backgrounds. The organisation has collaborated with 400 schools to date and in 2016 announced a partnership with The Evening Standard. In September 2016 the foundation will establish a free school in West Greenwich which will focus on creative skills.

Wight is also on the Board of Directors at Plotr, a site aimed at providing a wide variety of careers advice and guidance, including through the use of an online game.

== Media ==
Wight has written two books "The Day The Pigs Refused To Be Driven To Market" (1972), a study of advertising and consumerism and "The Peacocks Tail and the Reputation Reflex; the neuroscience of arts sponsorship"(2007), a study of the biological purpose of art. His advertising career was profiled on BBC Radio 4 in a programme titled 'The Most Fun You Can Have With Your Clothes On'.

== Personal life ==
Wight married Countess Paola Kovacz von Csaky, a barrister specialising in intellectual property law, in 2013. He has five children from previous marriages. His father, Ian, was a Brigadier in the British Army. His mother, Pamela (née) Groves was the daughter of Air Commodore R.M. Groves, the first Deputy Chief of the Air Staff of the RAF. Two of Wight's great grandparents were members of Parliament for Salford East and Salford West where the family brewery, Groves and Withnal was located. The Groves family established the Salford Lads' Club, still operating today, which featured on the cover of the Smiths' album The Queen is Dead in 1986.

During the 1987 general election, Wight stood as the Conservative candidate for the then-safe Labour seat of Bishop Auckland. His 18,613 votes were unmatched by any Conservative candidate until the 2017 General Election; of three candidates, he came second. He retains an active interest in politics and ran an anti-Gordon Brown campaign at the 2010 general election.

Wight was appointed Commander of the Order of the British Empire (CBE) in the 2020 Birthday Honours for services to diversity in the creative industries.

== Military career ==
In 2018, The British Army appointed Wight an Honorary Colonel in their 77th Brigade. The 77th Brigade is the Information Warfare Brigade named in honour of Orde Wingate, who led the Chindits in the Burmese campaign to considerable success. Wight served in Estonia as well as supporting the No.10 Communications Team during the Covid-19 pandemic of 2020.
