= Eileen Carron =

Bahamian lawyer and newspaper publisher

- Education: St. Michael's College, Toronto; Columbia University Graduate School of Journalism

Eileen Dupuch Carron, CMG (born 13 March 1930) is a Bahamian lawyer and newspaper publisher.

== Personal life ==
Dupuch was born in Nassau, the daughter of Étienne Dupuch and his wife Marie. She was educated at Queen's College and St. Francis Xavier's Academy before going abroad to study at St Francis' College in Hertfordshire, England.

She obtained a BA in philosophy from St. Michael's College, University of Toronto, a master's degree in journalism from Columbia University Graduate School of Journalism in New York City, before studying law at King's College London.

She was married to the Roger P. Carron, until his death in 2009.

== Career ==
In 1962, Carron became assistant editor at the Nassau-based The Tribune newspaper, which was founded by her grandfather, Leon Dupuch, and edited by her father. In the same year, she was called to the Bahamas Bar.

In 1972, she became publisher for The Tribune, becoming only the second female publisher in The Bahamas. As at August 2019, she was, having served 47 years, the longest currently serving editor and publisher in the Bahamas.

She was recognised by the International Press Institute for her "never-ending commitment to free press and the highest journalistic standard".

In 1993, Carron became the first CEO of a private radio station, The People's Radio Station, 100 JAMZ.

== Accomplishments ==
During her twenties, Carron became the first female pilot in the Bahamas. She was the second woman ever called to the Bahamas Bar.

She is the only Bahamian to have an editorial read into the record of the United States Senate.

In 2000, she was named a Companion of the Order of St Michael and St George.
