= Neil McIntosh (public administrator) =

Scottish public administrator

Sir Neil William David Mcintosh CBE DL FRSA FCIPD (born 30 January 1940) is a Scottish public administrator.

== Career ==
Educated at King's Park Senior Secondary School in Glasgow, Mcintosh worked for the sewing thread merchant J. & P. Coats (1957–59), then Honeywell Controls until 1962, when he joined the Berkshire, Oxford and Reading Joint Organisation and Methods Unit. After two years working at Stewarts & Lloyds, in 1966 Mcintosh became Senior Organisation and Methods Officer for Lanark County Council and then became the O&M officer at Inverness County Council three years later. In 1975, he joined Highland Regional Council, firstly as Personnel Officer, then, from 1981 as Director of Manpower Services. Between 1985 and 1992, he was Chief Executive of Dumfries and Galloway Regional Council, then, until 1996, he was the same for Strathclyde Regional Council. From then until 2001, he was Convener of the Scottish Council for Voluntary Organisations. From 2002 to 2008, he was then a Member of the Judicial Appointments Board for Scotland; from 2008 to 2013, he was a Civil Service Commissioner.

Mcintosh has also held a number of trusteeships and official positions, including his work as Chairman of the Commission on Local Government and the Scottish Parliament for the year 1998–99. He was appointed a Deputy Lieutenant for Dumfries in 1998, a Fellow of the Royal Society of Arts in 1989 and a Fellow of the Institute of Personnel Management in 1987, and holds honorary degrees from Syracuse University and Glasgow Caledonian University. In the 2000 Birthday Honours, he was knighted for "service to the community", having been appointed a Commander of the Order of the British Empire ten years earlier.
