= Deafblind UK =

British charity supporting people with Deafblindness

Deafblind UK is a national charity in the United Kingdom supporting people with sight and hearing loss to live the lives they want. Founded in 1928, Deafblind UK has its headquarters in Peterborough, Cambridgeshire. The charity help people to live with deafblindness by making connections, and building their confidence and independence through a range of services and campaigns. Run by staff and volunteers, the current CEO is Steve Conway, who has been in position since 2018. The current chairman in Robert Nolan.

== History ==
The foundations of Deafblind UK began in 1928, when a small group of deafblind people and their carers founded the National Deaf Blind League.

The following year in 1929 the first magazine for deafblind people, Braille Rainbow, was launched. During the Second World War, Rainbow was considered so important that it was one of very few publications exempt from paper rationing. Today, Rainbow is called 'Open Hand' and is still produced by Deafblind UK.

In 1936, Fellowship House in Hoylake was opened, which was the UK's first holiday home specifically for people with deafblindness.

In 1963, the charity built Rainbow Court, a complex of residential flats that were designed to enable deafblind adults to live independently.

The National Deaf Blind League became Deafblind UK in 1996.

A new National Centre for Deafblindness was opened in 2003 in Peterborough, Cambridgeshire, which acted as the headquarters conference centre for the charity. In 2020, this building was sold and headquarters were relocated to the Rainbow Court site.

== Operations ==
Deafblind UK offer the following services:

- Helpline
- Wellbeing and emotional support
- Care and support
- Supported living
- Befriending
- Social groups
- Technology including free online learning and webinars
- Open Hand magazine
- Holidays
- Empowering support

== Campaigns ==
Deafblind Awareness Week runs at the end of June to coincide with the birthday of Helen Keller. In 2021, it fell on the week of 28 June - 4 July. The week aims to make dual sensory loss a more widely known condition; educating people about what it is and letting them know what to look out for in themselves and others.

== Funding ==
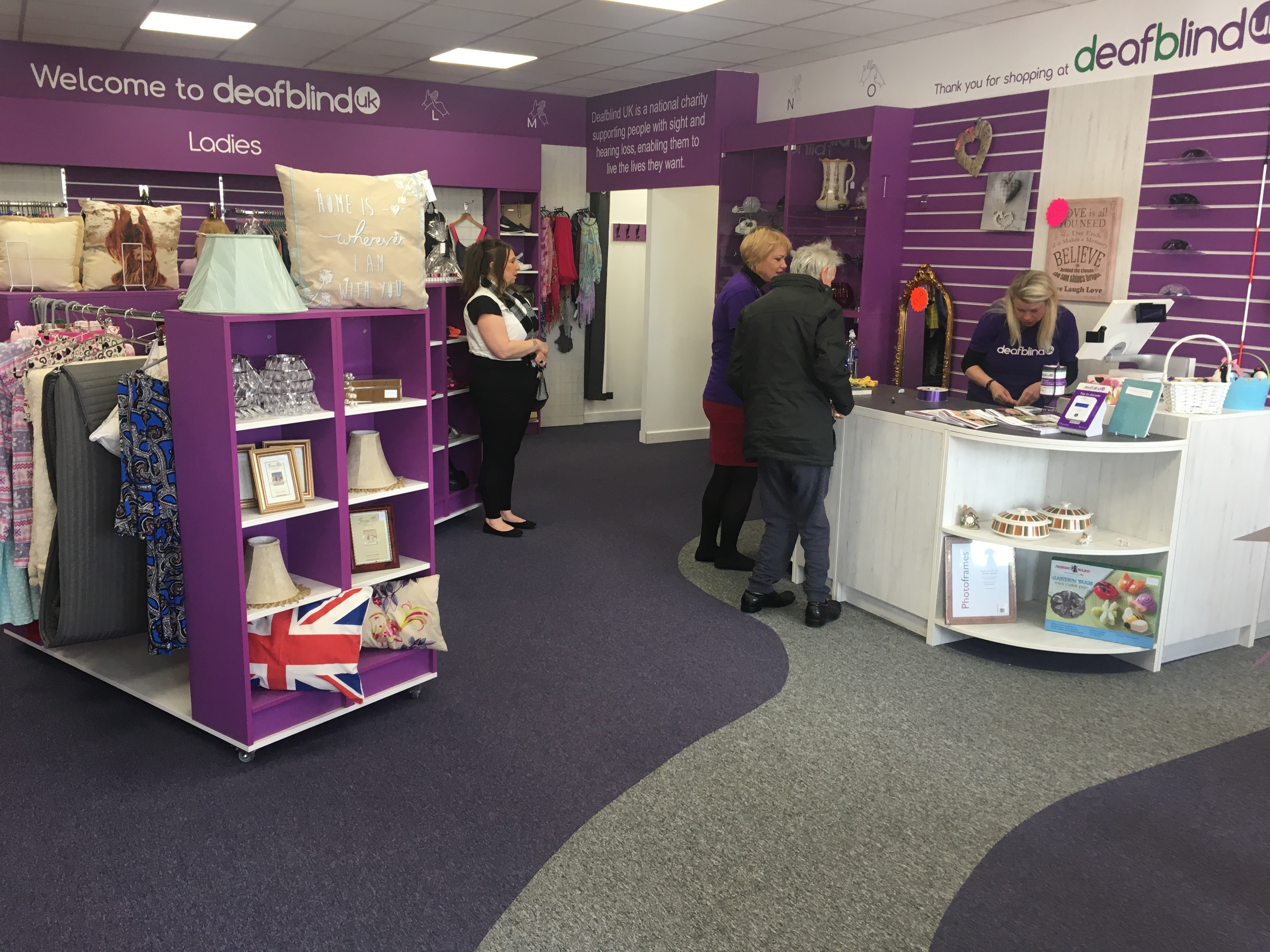
Internal photo of the Werrington charity shop.

Deafblind UK is funded by donations from the public, corporate partnerships, community fundraising, legacies and charitable trusts.

In 2019, Deafblind UK opened their first charity shop in Werrington, Cambridgeshire, which was the start of a new funding stream.

== Image gallery ==
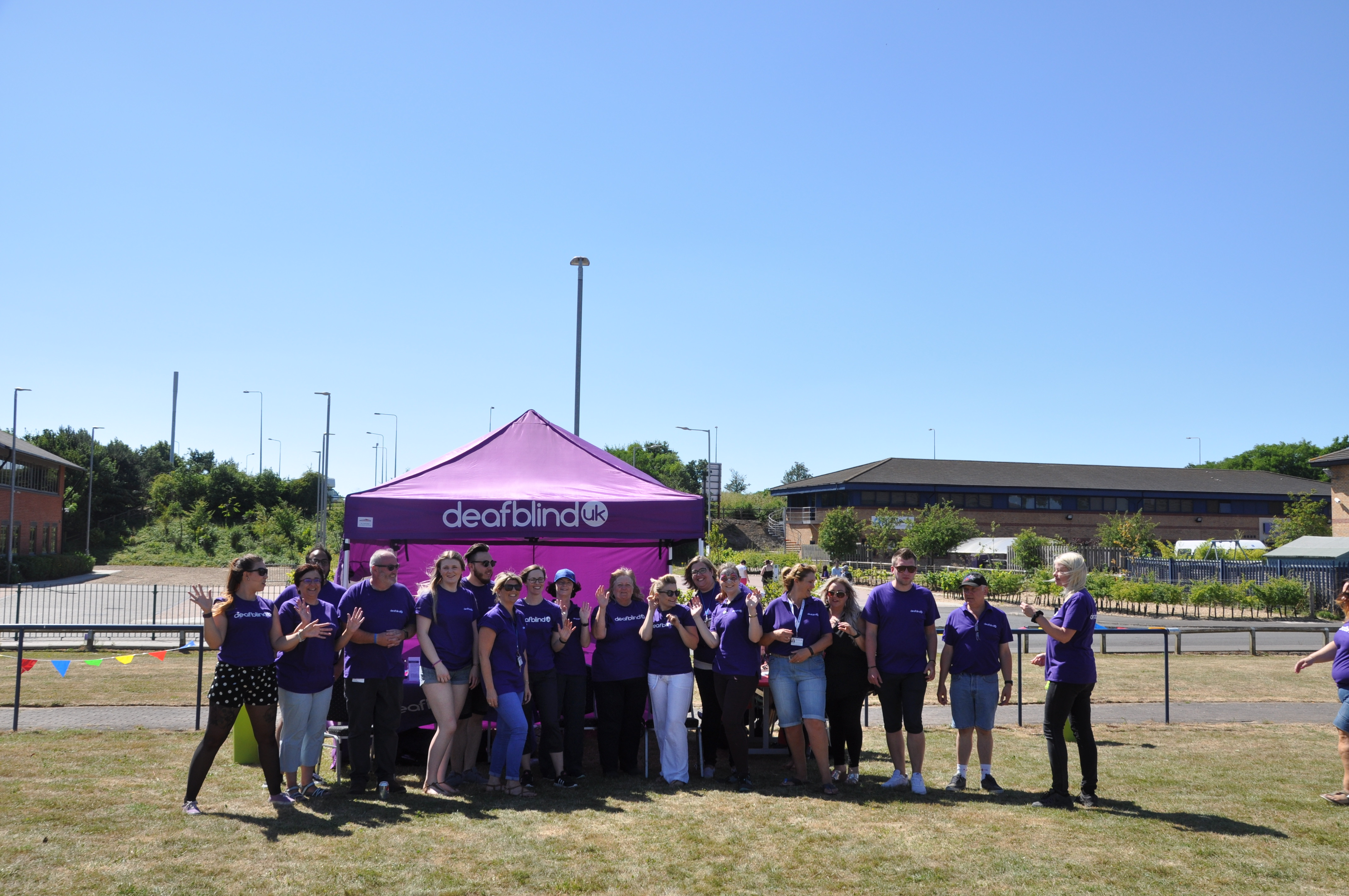
90th birthday celebrations

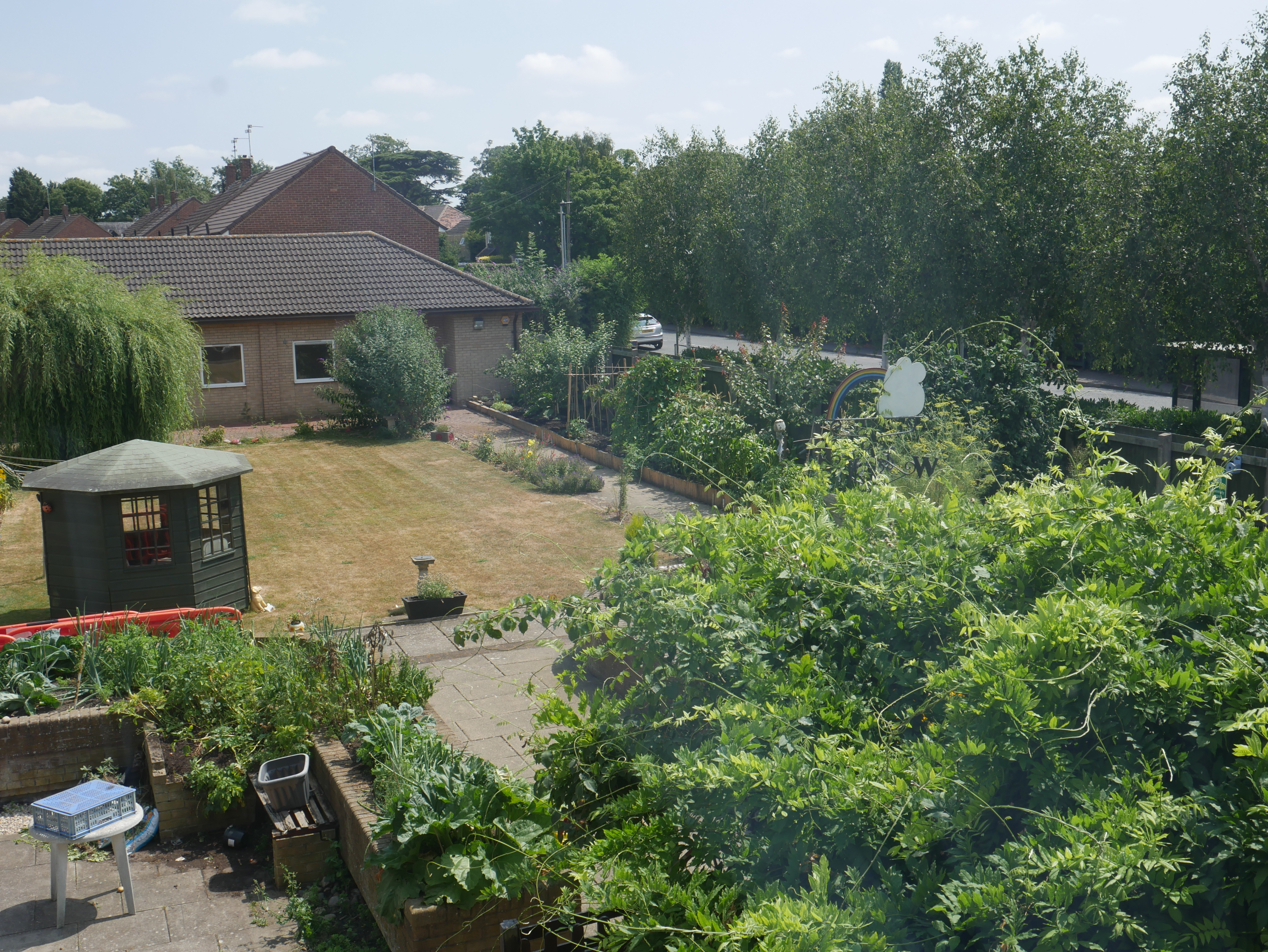
National Centre for Deafblindness and gardens.

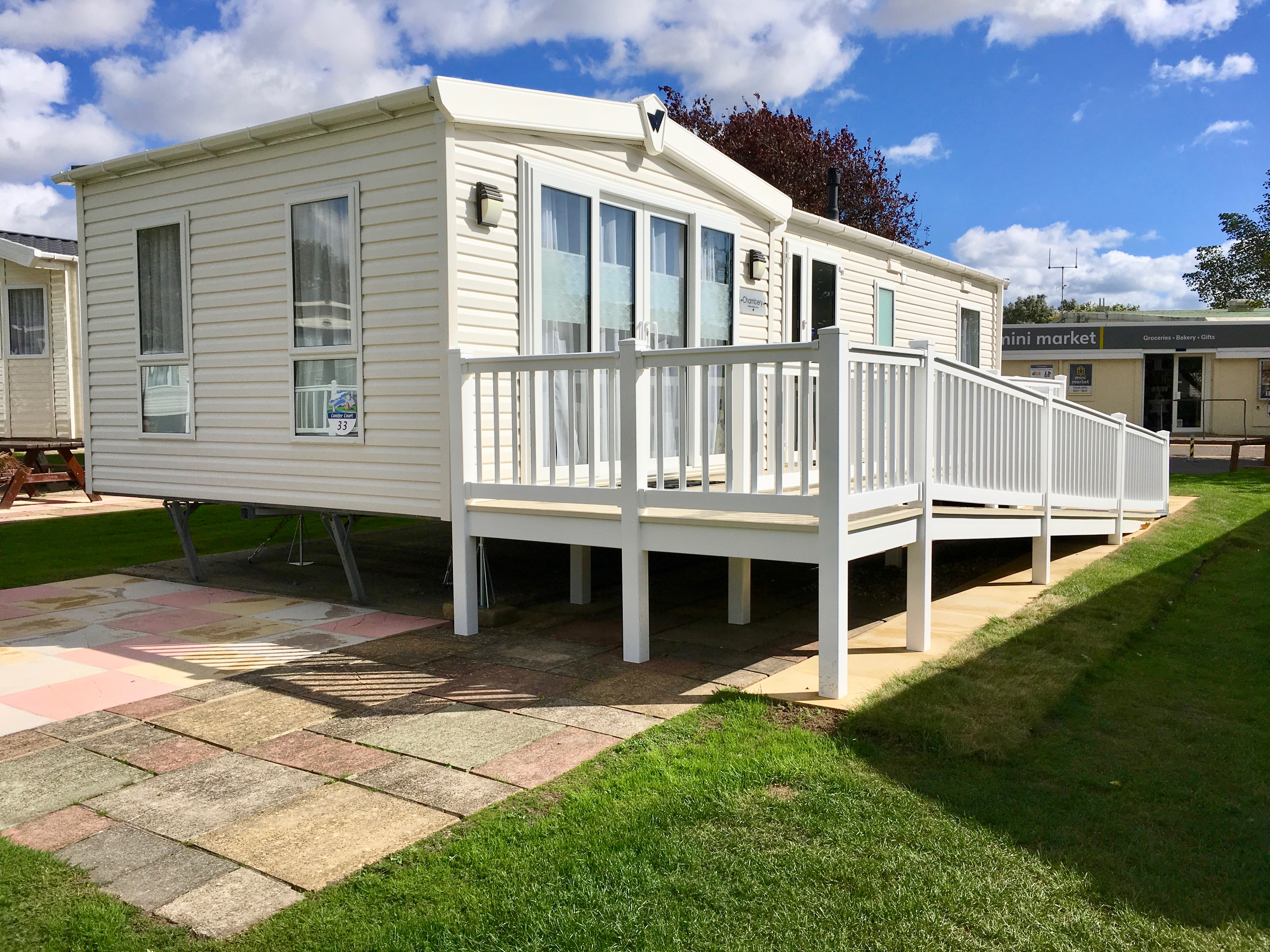
Static caravan in Hopton-on-Sea which allows deafblind people a holiday.
