= Mary Brydon =

British nurse

Mary Josephine Brydon, OBE, FRCN, is a British nurse who helped found the Norfolk Allergy Diagnostic and Advisory Service (NADAAS) and undertook a research project which demonstrated that there was a demand by both doctors and the public for this sort of service.

Another research project in 1997 involved a review of 1,000 patients. She discovered that three quarters of patients with asthma also suffer from rhinitis (which they developed first). In 1992, she joined the management committee of the British Allergy Foundation (now known as Allergy UK) and she has served as a member of the Board of Trustees, is on the Clinical Advisory Board, and is its Vice-President.

== Honours and awards ==
She was made a Fellow of the Royal College of Nursing in 1998 for her contribution to managing allergy care and development of advanced nursing practice.

In 2000 she was awarded the OBE for her contribution and services to allergy and published the first book solely dedicated to skin prick testing in clinical practice.
