= ZNJ-FM =

Radio station

- Freeport; Bahamas
- Broadcast area: New Providence, Bahamas
- Frequency: 100.3 MHz
- Branding: 100 Jamz

Programming
- Language: English
- Format: Urban adult contemporary, R&B, hip-hop, reggae, socca, calypso, Bahamian Junkanoo

Ownership
- Owner: Tribune Radio Limited; (Tribune Radio Limited)

History
- First air date: 1993
- Call sign meaning: ZN (former ITU prefix under United Kingdom rule) Jamz

Technical information
- ERP: 5,000 watts (ZNJ-FM); 5,000 watts (ZNJ-FM-1); 5,000 watts (ZNJ-FM-2); 1,000 watts (ZNJ-FM-3)
- Transmitter coordinates: 26°32′N 78°39′W (ZNJ-FM); 26°32′N 77°04′W (ZNJ-FM-1); 25°02′48.70″N 77°19′02.65″W (ZNJ-FM-2); 26°52′N 77°31′W (ZNJ-FM-3)
- Repeaters: ZNJ-FM-1 100.1 Marsh Harbour; ZNJ-FM-2 100.3 Nassau; ZNJ-FM-3 100.5 Coopers Town

Links
- Webcast: https://streamdb8web.securenetsystems.net/cirrusencore/100JAMZ&
- Website: Official website

ZNJ-FM, more popularly known as 100 JAMZ, is an urban adult contemporary radio station broadcasting in Freeport, Bahamas. Founded in 1993, the radio station covers most of the Bahamas with its primary repeater in Freeport, and three repeaters to serve other portions of the Bahamas as well: ZNJ-FM-1 100.1 in Marsh Harbour, ZNJ-FM-2 100.3 in Nassau and ZNJ-FM-3 in Coopers Town.
