= Bernard Schreier =

British businessman (1918 - 2013)

Sir Bernard Schreier (28 March 1918 Gösting, Graz 13, Graz, Steiermark, Austria – 1 June 2013), born Bernhard Dov Schreier to Hermann Schreier and Anna Kaswiner), was a Jewish businessman and mechanical engineer. He was born in Austria, then fled to Palestine and lived in Israel. Later he moved to England to develop his businesses.

Schreier's father was a textile merchant from Gösting whose business collapsed in the 1920s; after the Nazi occupation of Austria, the Schreiers tried to flee abroad and Bernhard was taken to Palestine with one of his sisters in 1939 (two others had permits to travel to the United Kingdom); their parents later joined them in Palestine. During the Second World War, he volunteered in the British Army; after the formation of the Israeli Defence Forces in 1948, he was commissioned into the new Engineering Corps and served with them in the Arab–Israeli War that year. He subsequently became a civilian mechanical engineer, working on roads and infrastructure, eventually establishing his own contracting business.

After serving in the Israeli Army again during the Suez Crisis in 1956, Schreier and has family moved to England so that he could work for an engineering company. He then established CP Holdings, which refurbished and resold second-hand heavy equipment; it proved lucrative and in 1977 acquired a business in opencast mining. He gradually acquired smaller competitors and built what The Telegraph described as "a substantial industrial conglomerate". When communism collapsed in Eastern Europe, Schreier took over firstly the Caterpillar Inc. dealership in Hungary and then, from 1995, a large stake in the country's Danubius Hotels Group, which he expanded across Eastern Europe. He was a "passionate enthusiast" for Hungary and was knighted in 2000 for "services to the development of UK–Hungary trade.". At the time of his death, his family's net worth was estimated at £265 million. In the beginning of the 21st century Schreier bought the Israeli Tractor Company and merged into Zoko Group, rearranging as a subsidiary Tractors and Equipment (I.T.E.). This company is the official Caterpillar Inc. dealer in Israel.
