= Anthea Millett =

British educator (1941–2022)

Anthea Christine Millett, CBE, FRGS, FRSA (2 November 1941 – 5 December 2022) was a British educator who held a number of appointments and posts in the public sector, including Chairman of the Avon, Gloucestershire and Wiltshire Strategic Health Authority (2002–2006).

== Early life and teaching career ==
Anthea Christine Millett was born in Aldridge, Staffordshire on 2 November 1941. A graduate of the University of London, Millett began her teaching career in London, moving from there to Birmingham, Solihull and Coventry, where she was deputy head of a large comprehensive school.

== Career with HM Inspectorate ==
In 1978, she entered HM Inspectorate, and in 1984 became Staff Inspector for assessment and examinations. In 1978, she became Chief Inspector with responsibility for Special Educational Needs (SEN), educational disadvantage and inner cities, inspection policy and Schools 11–16. She became Director of Inspection at Ofsted in August 1992. From January 1995 until December 1999, she was Chief Executive of the Teacher Training Agency (TTA).

== Voluntary work ==
Millett's voluntary contributions included:

- Vice Presidency/Education – Royal Geographical Society
- Governorship – The Commonwealth Institute
- Chief Executive – Governing Body of the Francis Holland (Church of England) Schools Trust
- Director – The Dyslexia Institute

== Personal life and death ==
Millett died from progressive supranuclear palsy in Sidmouth, Devon, on 5 December 2022, aged 81.

== Honours ==
Millett was awarded:

- CBE "for services to teacher training" in 2000
- Fellow and former Vice President (Education) of the Royal Geographical Society (FRGS)
- Fellow of the Royal Society of Arts (FRSA)
- Member of Council of the Commonwealth Institute.
