= Ian Brackenbury =

RAF officer

Air Vice-Marshal Ian Brackenbury, CB, OBE, FIMechE, CEng (born 28 August 1945) is a former senior Royal Air Force officer.

== Early life ==
Brackenbury was born on 28 August 1945, the son of Captain D. E. Brackenbury and R. Brackenbury.

== Career ==
Brackenbury graduated from the Royal Air Force College Cranwell with a Bachelor of Science (BSc) degree in Aeronautical Engineering, and in 1967 was commissioned as a pilot officer in the Engineer Branch of the Royal Air Force. He later became a Chartered Engineer (CEng) and a Fellow of the Institute of Mechanical Engineers. Following promotion in 1972 to Flight Lieutenant, Brackenbury joined the Directorate of Aircraft Engineering in 1975 and was promoted to Squadron Leader the following year.

In 1981, he became a member of the Engineering Staff at Strike Command, and two years later was promoted to the rank of Wing Commander, before joining the Department for Supply and Organisation in 1986; the following year, he was appointed an Officer of the Order of the British Empire (OBE). In 1988, he was promoted to Group Captain; and in 1993 became an Air Commodore and also became Director of Support Management. He was Director of Helicopter Support between 1995 and 1997 and Air Officer Engineering and Supply at Strike Command between 1997 and 1998, when he was promoted for the final time as an Air Vice-Marshal; he served as Director-General of Defence Logistics (Operations and Policy) at the Ministry of Defence from them until he retired in 2000. On retirement, Brackenbury was appointed a Companion of the Order of the Bath. Between 2001 and 2006, he was Director of Rolls-Royce Defence Aerospace (Europe), and since 2009 he has been a Trustee of Cornwall Air Ambulance.
