= Terry Bamford =

British social worker (1942–2020)

Terence Donald Bamford OBE (1942 – 9 February 2020) was a social worker and writer on social work topics.

He had a degree in law from University College, Oxford, and a Diploma in Social Administration from the London School of Economics.

He worked as a probation officer for eight years before becoming Assistant General Secretary of the British Association of Social Workers. He then worked in Harrow and served for two years as Chair of the Association. He was Director of Social Services in Northern Ireland from 1985 to 1990. For ten years he was Executive Director of Housing and Social Services in the Royal Borough of Kensington and Chelsea. He was appointed an OBE in 2000. He was chair of Kensington and Chelsea Primary Care Trust. In 2008 he was awarded the Medal and Diploma in Memory of Andrew Mouravieff-Apostol by the International Federation of Social Workers.

He died on 9 February 2020 at the age of 77.

== Publications ==
- Managing Social Work. Tavistock Library of Social Work Practice. Vol. 239. Tavistock. 1982. ISBN 978-0-422-77970-8.
- The Future of Social Work. Macmillan. 1989. doi:10.1007/978-1-349-20369-7. ISBN 978-1-349-20369-7.
- Coulshed, Veronica (1990). "Foreword". Management in Social Work. Macmillan. p. xi. doi:10.1007/978-1-349-20851-7. ISBN 978-0-333-51483-2.
- Commissioning and Purchasing. The Social Work Skills Series. Routledge. 2001. ISBN 978-1-134-53925-3.
- A Contemporary History of Social Work. Policy Press. 2015. ISBN 978-1-4473-2215-3.
