= Adrian Webb =

British Academic

Sir Adrian Leonard Webb FLSW FRSA (born 19 July 1943) is a British academic and public administrator.

== Education and early life ==
Born in Newport, Wales, Webb attended St Julian's High School and the University of Birmingham; he graduated from the latter with a Bachelor of Social Sciences (BSocSci) degree in 1965, and then completed a Master of Science (MSc) in economics at the London School of Economics in 1966.

== Academic career ==
He subsequently lectured there until 1974, when he spent two years as Research Director at the Personal Social Services Council. In 1976, he joined Loughborough University as Professor of Social Policy and remained there until 1976; between 1983 and 1993, he was Director of Loughborough's Centre for Research in Social Policy; he was also Dean, then Pro Vice-Chancellor and then Senior Pro Vice-Chancellor at Loughborough. In 1993, Webb was appointed Vice-Chancellor at the University of Glamorgan, serving until 2004.

He has also sat on a wide range of public bodies as director, trustee or chairman, including membership of the National Committee of Inquiry into Higher Education (1996–97), the BBC Broadcasting Council for Wales, the National Council for Education and Learning in Wales, the Beecham Review of Public Services in Wales, the Administrative Justice and Tribunals Council, the Management Board of the National Assembly for Wales and several NHS Trusts.

== Awards and honours ==
He was knighted in 2000, received a Doctor of Letters (DLitt) degree from Loughborough in 1993, and has been elected a Fellow of the Learned Society of Wales and the Royal Society of Arts.
