= Graham Morgan (nurse) =

British healthcare professional

Sir Graham Morgan
- Born: 20 August 1947 (age 78)
- Died: London
- Education: Treorchy Secondary Modern School
- Occupation: healthcare professional
- Partner: Raymond Willetts (civ:2006)
- Parents: Islwyn Morgan (father); Phyllis Morgan (mother)

Sir Graham Morgan (born 20 August 1947) was a British healthcare professional and healthcare director.

== Early life and family ==
Morgan was born on 20 August 1947 to Islwyn and Phyllis Morgan. He was educated at Treorchy Secondary Modern School in Treorchy, Wales.

In 2006, Morgan entered into a civil partnership with Raymond Willetts. Raymond died in 2020.

He died at St Mary's Convent & Nursing home, in Chiswick, London, on 26 September 2024.

== Career ==
Morgan trained as nurse at Llandough Hospital, Cardiff, becoming a registered general nurse in 1969. He worked at Llandough Hospital as a staff nurse for a year, before spells at Royal Marsden Hospital and St Mary's Hospital, London. Between 1974 and 1983, he was the Nursing Officer at King's College Hospital, and was then Assistant Director of Nursing at St Charles' Hospital until 1991. He was the Special Nurse Adviser (1991–94) and then Director of Nursing and Quality (1994–99) at the Central Middlesex Hospital. Between 1999 and 2005, he was Executive Director of Nursing at the North West London Hospitals NHS Trust. After two years as Director of Clinical Strategy at the same Trust, he worked as an independent health care adviser between 2007 and 2017.

In the 2000 Birthday Honours, Morgan was appointed a Knight Bachelor (Kt) "for services to Health Care". On 21 November 2000, he was knighted by Queen Elizabeth II during a ceremony at Buckingham Palace.

=== Ordained ministry ===
Morgan was ordained in the Church of England as a deacon in 1983 and as a priest in 1984. He was a non-stipendiary minister (formally Honorary Associate Priest) at St Michael and All Angels Church, Bedford Park, since 2003.
