= 2009 New Year Honours =

British royal recognitions

The New Year Honours 2009 were announced on 31 December 2008 in the United Kingdom, New Zealand, Cook Islands, Barbados, Grenada, Saint Vincent and the Grenadines, Belize, Antigua and Barbuda, and Saint Christopher and Nevis, to celebrate the year past and mark the beginning of 2009.

The recipients of honours are displayed here as they were styled before their new honour, and arranged by the country whose ministers advised The Queen on the appointments, then by honour, with grades i.e. Knight/Dame Grand Cross, Knight/Dame Commander etc. and then divisions i.e. Civil, Diplomatic and Military as and where appropriate.

== United Kingdom ==
=== Knights Bachelor ===
- Professor Timothy Robert Peter Brighouse. For services to Education.
- Professor David Nicholas Cannadine, lately Queen Elizabeth The Queen Mother Professor, Institute of Historical Research, University of London. For services to Scholarship.
- Alexander Crombie, Group Chief Executive, Standard Life. For services to the Insurance Industry in Scotland.
- Dr. Andrew Cubie, CBE, lately Chair of the Court, Napier University. For public service in Scotland.
- Peter John Bellet Dixon, lately chairman, Housing Corporation. For services to the Housing Sector.
- Professor Neil James Douglas, President, Royal College of Physicians of Edinburgh. For services to Medicine.
- Robert Paul Edwards, Headteacher, Garforth Community College, Leeds. For services to local and national Education.
- Professor Christopher John Greenwood, CMG. Professor of International Law, London School of Economics. For services to public International Law.
- Christoper Andrew Hoy, MBE, Cyclist. For services to Sport.
- David Charles Jones, CBE. For services to Business and to Charity.
- Kenneth Lloyd Jones, QPM, Chief Constable and President, Association of Chief Police Officers. For services to the Police.
- Nigel Graham Knowles, Chief Executive and Managing Partner for Europe and Asia, DLA Piper International LLP. For services to the Legal Profession.
- David Thomas Rowell Lewis. For services to the legal profession and to the City of London Corporation.
- John Robert Madejski, OBE. For charitable services.
- Neil Stuart McKay, CB, Chief Executive, East of England Strategic Health Authority. For services to the NHS.
- His Honour Judge Goolam Hoosen Kader Meeran, lately President, Employment Tribunal (England and Wales). For services to the Administration of Justice.
- Nicholas Wyndham Partridge, OBE, Chief Executive, Terrence Higgins Trust. For services to Healthcare.
- John Christopher Powell, chairman, National Endowment for Science, Technology and the Arts. For services to the Advertising Industry.
- Terence David John Pratchett, OBE, Author. For services to Literature.
- Bernard Francisco Ribeiro, CBE, lately President, Royal College of Surgeons. For services to Medicine.
- Professor Martin John Taylor, FRS, Professor in Pure Mathematics, University of Manchester. For services to Science.
- Dr. Mark Jeremy Walport, Director, Wellcome Trust. For services to Medical Research.

=== Order of the Bath ===
==== Knight Grand Cross of the Order of the Bath (GCB) ====
Military Division

- General Sir Francis Richard Dannatt, KCB, CBE, MC, ADC, Chief of the General Staff, British Army (shall be retiring as professional head of the Army in 2009 to be replaced by Sir David Richards)

==== Knights Commander of the Order of the Bath (KCB) ====
Military Division

- Vice Admiral Trevor Alan Soar, OBE
- Air Marshal Christopher Hugh Moran, OBE, MVO
- Air Marshal Stuart William Peach, CBE

Civil Division

- Nicholas Macpherson, Permanent Secretary, HM Treasury
- Jonathan Phillips, Permanent Secretary, Northern Ireland Office

==== Companions of the Order of the Bath (CB) ====
Military Division

- Major General John Gordon Rose MBE RM
- Major General Adrian John Bradshaw OBE, King's Royal Hussars
- Lt. Gen Andrew Collingwood Figgures CBE
- Lt. Gen Louis Patrick Lillywhite MBE QHS
- Maj Gen. Jonathan David Page OBE, Parachute Regiment
- Air Vice Marshal Charles Wright Ness

Civil Division

- Patricia Margaret Alrded, CBE, Director-General and Deputy Head of the Foreign and Defence Policy Secretariat, Cabinet Office
- Harry James Benson. Freelance photojournalist. For services to photography, and to the community in the UK.
- John Stephen Pitt-Brooke, Director-General Secretariat, Land Forces, Ministry of Defence
- Nicholas Peter Clegg. Founder and Managing Trustee and chairman, Daiwa Anglo-Japanese Foundation. For services to UK-Japanese relations.
- Professor Linda Colley. Author and Professor of History, Princeton University. For services to historical studies.
- Professor Derek William Jones, Former Senior Director, Welsh Assembly Government
- Professor Peter Hugh Nolan. Sinyi Professor, Judge Business School, University of Cambridge. For services to supporting British business in China and China's integration into the global economy.
- Professor David Norse. Emeritus Professor of Environmental Management, UCL. For services to international sustainable development and UK/China relations.
- David John Pearson, Deputy Treasury Solicitor, Treasury Solicitor's Department
- John Richard Shervington Skerritt. Financial Secretary. For public service, Montserrat.
- David James Smith, Commercial Director, Dept. for Work and Pensions
- Ralph Edwin Tabberer, Director-General for Schools, Dept. for Children, Schools and Families

=== Order of Saint Michael and Saint George ===
==== Knights Commander of the Order of St Michael and St George (KCMG) ====
- Andrew Thomas Cahn, CMG. Chief Executive, UK Trade and Investment.
- William Charters Patey, CMG. HM Ambassador, Riyadh.

==== Companion of the Order of St Michael and St George (CMG) ====
Military Division

- Colonel Peter David Fraser-Hopewell MBE, Royal Scots

Civil Division

- Mark Canning. HM Ambassador, Rangoon.
- Eugene Gerard Curley, OBE. Counsellor, Foreign and Commonwealth Office.
- Christopher John Hickey. Director, British Council, Spain.
- Anthony Michael Layden. The Foreign Secretary's Representative for Deportation with Assurances. For services to Counter-Terrorism.
- Robert Macaire. Former Director of Consular Services, Foreign and Commonwealth Office.
- Sarah MacIntosh. Former British High Commissioner, Freetown.
- Richard Gordon Monk, OBE, QPM. Former Police Commissioner, UN Interim Mission in Kosovo. For services to Policing in Kosovo.
- Adam McClure Thomson. Director of South Asia and Afghanistan, Foreign and Commonwealth Office.
- Scott Andrew Norman Wightman. Former Director of Global and Economic Issues, Foreign and Commonwealth Office.

=== Royal Victorian Order ===
==== Knights Commander of the Royal Victorian Order (KCVO) ====
- His Grace The Duke of Devonshire, CBE, HM's Representative at Ascot
- Rear Admiral Jeremy Michael De Halpert, CB, Deputy Master, Trinity House
- The Rt Hon. Raymond Arthur Clanaboy, 4th Baron O'Neill, TD, Former Lord Lieutenant of County Antrim
- Sir John Charles Buchanan Riddell, Bt., CVO, Lord Lieutenant of Northumberland

==== Commanders of the Royal Victorian Order (CVO) ====
- Elizabeth Faith Currer Buchanan LVO, Former Private Secretary to TRHs The Prince of Wales and The Duchess of Cornwall
- Major General David Leslie Burden CB CBE, Former Receiver General and Chapter Clerk, Westminster Abbey
- Paul Robert Virgo Clarke, Chief Executive and Clerk of the Council of the Duchy of Lancaster
- Sir Thomas Farmer CBE, chairman of the board of Trustees, The Duke of Edinburgh's Award
- Stuart Gordon Mole OBE, Former Lord Lieutenant of East Sussex
- Michael John Stevens LVO, Deputy Treasurer to The Queen and Director of Finance to the Royal Household
- Hugh Rowland Wyatt, Former Lord Lieutenant of West Sussex 1998–2008

==== Lieutenants of the Royal Victorian Order (LVO) ====
- Mrs Alisa Jane Anderson, Deputy Press Secretary to The Queen and Head of News
- Peter McEuan Ashby, Helicopter Pilot, Queen's Helicopter Flight
- Dr Khaled Omar Azzam, Director of the Prince's School of Traditional Arts
- George Hassall MVO, director, Royal and Diplomatic Affairs, Jaguar Land Rover
- Thomas George Stewart McCaw MVO, Former Land Steward, Eastern District, The Duchy of Cornwall
- Charlotte Helen Robinson MVO, Administrator, Privy Purse and Treasurer's Office

==== Members of the Royal Victorian Order (MVO) ====
- Edward George Bedding, Senior Painter and Decorator, Royal Household
- Tracy Caroline Emms, Executive Assistant to the Defence Services Secretary
- Michael John Field, Framing and Exhibition Conservator, Royal Collection
- Michael David Flynn, Duke of Edinburgh's Coachman
- Diana Rosemary Hawkins, Former Secretary to the Ladies-in-Waiting to The Queen
- Chief Inspector John Anthony Hourihan, for services to Royalty Protection, Metropolitan Police Service
- Mrs Joan Mary Hughes, Entries Secretary, Royal Windsor Horse Show
- Roger Langley Judd, Former Assistant Organist, St George's Chapel, Windsor
- Keith Thomas Lawler, Senior Painter and Decorator, Royal Household
- Rachel Louise Loryman, Secretary, HRH The Duke of York's Household
- Mrs Eva Grazyna Zielinska-Millar, Senior Photographer, Royal Collection
- Mrs Katrina Mary Munro, Head of Design, Royal Collection Enterprises Ltd.
- Diana Stantion, Lieutenancy Officer, Somerset County Council

=== Royal Victorian Medal (RVM) ===
==== RVM Gold ====
- Adrian Osborne RVM, Electrician, Sandringham Estate

==== RVM Silver ====
- Sgt John Matthew Attwell, Former Orderly to HRH The Duke of York
- PC Malcolm Brownlee, for services to Royalty Protection, Metropolitan Police Service
- Dennis Michael Burge, Heating Engineer, Hampton Court Palace, Historical Royal Palaces
- Sgt Gregory John Gillham, for services to Royalty Protection, Metropolitan Police Service
- Andrew Paul Godfrey, Fruit Farm Worker, Sandringham Estate
- Kenneth Pritchard Jones, Head Groundsman, Crown Estate, Windsor
- David Francis Long, Proprietor, Walter and Gas Services
- Mrs Margaret Mary Mountstevens, Former Daily Lady, Frogmore House
- John Daniel Powell, Yeoman Bed Goer, Queen's Body Guard of the Yeomen of the Guard
- Keith Sanderson, Chauffeur, Royal Household
- Roderick Clive Truelove, Yeoman Clerk, HM Tower of London
- Mrs Flora Wehlau, Household Attendant, Government House, Canberra, Australia.

=== Order of the British Empire ===
==== Knight Grand Cross of the Order of the British Empire (GBE) ====
- The Rt Hon. Gordon Slynn, The Lord Slynn of Hadley, QC, PC. Former chairman, International Law Association. For services to European and International Law.

==== Knights/Dames Commander of the Order of the British Empire (KBE/DBE) ====
Military Division

- Lieutenant General Graeme Cameron Maxwell Lamb, CMG, DSO, OBE, Queen's Own Highlanders

Civil Division

- Jennifer Gita Abramsky, CBE, lately Group Director, BBC Audio and Music. For services to broadcasting.
- Professor Sally Claire Davies, Director of Research and Development, Department of Health. For services to medicine.
- Elizabeth Fradd, for services to nursing.
- Professor Wendy Hall, CBE, Professor of Computer Science, University of Southampton. For services to Science and Technology.
- Anne Elizabeth Owers, CBE, Her Majesty’s Chief Inspector of Prisons. For services to the criminal justice system.
- Dr. Rosalind Joy Savill, CBE, Director, The Wallace Collection. For services to the arts.

==== Commanders of the Order of the British Empire (CBE) ====
Military Division

Royal Navy

- Surgeon Commodore Timothy Roger Douglas-Riley, QHP
- Rear Admiral Trevor Allan Spires

Army

- Brigadier Robert Hanbury Tenison Aitken, Royal Regiment of Wales
- Brigadier Nicholas Roy Davies MBE MC, Parachute Regiment
- Colonel Timothy John Hodgetts QHP, Royal Army Medical Corps
- Brigadier Stephen George Vowles, Army Legal Services Branch (AGC)

Royal Air Force

- Group Captain Andrew Brian Brecht OBE
- Air Commodore Philip Colin Osborn OBE
- Group Captain Edward Jackson Stringer OBE

Civil Division

- Charles Benedict Ainslie, O.B.E., Sailor. For services to Sport.
- James Felton Somers Hervey-Bathurst, lately President, Historic Houses Association. For services to Heritage.
- Nicholas John Bowd, Head of Scottish Procurement Directorate, Scottish Executive.
- Isabelle, Mrs. Boyd, Headteacher, Cardinal Newman High School, Bellshill, North Lanarkshire. For services to Education.
- David John Brailsford, M.B.E., Performance Director, British Cycling. For services to Sport.
- Professor Tina Bruce, Visiting professor of Early Childhood Studies, Roehampton University. For services to Early Years Education.
- Alistair Buchanan, Chief Executive, Office of Gas and Electricity Markets. For public service.
- Earl Cameron, Actor. For services to Drama.
- Douglas Caster, Chief Executive, Ultra Electronics Holdings plc. For services to the Defence Industry.
- Michael Chance, Opera singer. For services to Music.
- Thomas Alastair Clark. For services to Central Banking.
- Dr. Kathleen Louise Costeloe, Professor of Paediatrics. For services to Medicine in London.
- John Coughlan, Director of Children's Services, Hampshire County Council. For services to Local Government.
- Shirley, Mrs. Cramer, lately National Council Member, Learning and Skills Council and Chief Executive, Dyslexia Action. For services to Education.
- Ms Lucy Manuela de Groot, executive director, Improvement and Development Agency. For services to Local Government.
- Professor Colin Dennis. For services to the Agri-food Industry.
- David Keith Dingle, Chief Executive OYcer, Carnival UK. For services to the Shipping Industry.
- Ben Paul Oakley Dyson, Director of Primary Care, Department of Health.
- Professor Leslie Colin Ebdon, Vice-Chancellor, University of Bedfordshire. For services to local and national Higher Education.
- Keith Elliott, Principal, City of Bristol College. For services to Further Education.
- Richard John Hugo Fleck, chairman, Auditing Practices Board. For services to Business and to the Legal Profession.
- David George Flory, Director-General, NHS Finance, Performance and Operations, Department of Health.
- John Christopher Freeman, Director, Children's Services, Dudley Metropolitan Borough Council. For services to Local Government.
- Professor Duncan Ian Dunbar Gallie, Official Fellow, Nuffield College, University of Oxford. For services to Social Science.
- Judith Valerie, Mrs. Gibson, Director of Contact Centres, Jobcentre Plus, Department for Work and Pensions. For public and voluntary service.
- Professor Lesley Anne Glover, Chief Scientific Adviser for Scotland. For services to Environmental Science.
- Bryan Mark Gray, M.B.E., chairman, North West Regional Development Agency. For services to Business and to the community in the North West.
- Wynne Philip Morgan Griffiths, Chief Executive, Young's Seafood Limited. For services to the Food Industry.
- Professor Ian Halliday, Chief Executive, Scottish Universities Physics Alliance and President, European Science Foundation. For services to Science.
- Dr. Patricia Anne Hamilton, President, Royal College of Paediatrics and Child Health. For services to Medicine.
- Sue, Mrs. Hammerson, O.B.E. For charitable services.
- Hugh Christopher Emlyn Harris, Founder, London First Global Network. For voluntary service to Community Relations in the City of London.
- Charles Donald Hendry, Q.F.S.M., Chief Fire Officer, Kent Fire and Rescue Service. For services to Local Government.
- Robert David Holden, chief executive officer, London and Continental Railways Ltd. For services to the Rail Industry.
- William Andrew Myers Holroyd, O.B.E., lately President, Law Society. For services to the Administration of Justice.
- Dr. Owain Arwel Hughes, O.B.E., Conductor. For services to Music and to Charity.
- Jeremy Robin Powis Hyde, H.M. Deputy Chief Inspector of the Crown Prosecution Service.
- Dr. John Gordon Jenkins, Consultant Paediatrician, Waveney and Antrim Hospitals. For services to Medicine in Northern Ireland.
- Peter Jones. For services to Business, Entrepreneurship and to Young People.
- James Juffs, Chief Operating Officer, Debt Management Office, H.M. Treasury. For public and voluntary service.
- His Honour Judge Geoffrey Harvey Kamil, Circuit Judge. For services to the Administration of Justice.
- Tarun Kapur, Executive Headteacher, Ashton-on-Mersey and Broadoak Schools, Trafford. For services to Education.
- William James Gregory Keegan. For services to Financial Journalism.
- Professor Thomas Burton Loram Kirkwood, Professor of Medicine and Director, Institute for Ageing and Health, Newcastle University. For services to Medical Science.
- Malcolm Lowe-Lauri, lately Chief Executive, King's College Hospital NHS Foundation Trust. For services to the NHS.
- Dr. Melanie Lee, Executive Vice-president, UCB and deputy chair, Cancer Research UK. For services to Medical Science.
- Ian Leitch, Director of Resources and Governance, Scottish Parliament.
- Linda, Mrs. Lennon, Area Director, Her Majesty's Courts Service, Ministry of Justice.
- Professor Henrietta Miriam Ottoline Leyser, F.R.S., Professor of Plant Developmental Genetics, University of York. For services to Plant Science.
- Dr. Nigel Francis Lightfoot, Chief Adviser, Health Protection Agency. For services to Public Health.
- Derek Anthony Ludlow, M.B.E., D.L., chairman, Ludlow Group of Companies. For services to Business and to the community in Bedfordshire.
- Juliet, Mrs. Lyon, Director, Prison Reform Trust. For services to the Welfare of Prisoners.
- John MacQuarrie, lately Deputy Ombudsman, Office of the Assembly Ombudsman, Northern Ireland. For public and voluntary service.
- Clive Andrew Maxwell. For public service.
- Daniel Francis McAllister, Area Manager, East Midlands Region, H.M. Prison Service, Ministry of Justice.
- Richard John McCarthy, Director-General of Housing and Planning, Department for Communities and Local Government.
- Colin William McKerracher, Q.P.M., Chief Constable, Grampian Police. For services to the Police.
- Francis McLoughlin, Principal, City and Islington College, London. For services to Further Education.
- David George Moorhouse, chairman, Lloyds Register. For services to the Maritime Industry.
- Terence Keith Morgan, Chief Executive, Tube Lines. For services to Public Transport.
- Leslie Porter Murray, chairman, Tidy Northern Ireland and lately chairman, ARENA Network. For services to the Environment.
- Ms Gillian Mary Newton, Chief Executive, Fire Service College, Department for Communities and Local Government.
- Michael William Norgrove, Director of Excise, Stamps and Money Business, H.M. Revenue and Customs.
- Michael David Parker, lately chief executive officer, British Nuclear Fuels plc. For services to the Energy Industry.
- Stephen Parker. For public service.
- Councillor David Parsons, Leader, Leicestershire County Council and chairman, East Midlands Regional Assembly. For services to Local and Regional Government and to the Voluntary Sector.
- Nicholas Campbell Paul, chairman, Advantage West Midlands. For services to Business.
- David Lee Pearson, O.B.E. For services to Equestrianism and to Disabled Sport.
- Courtney Pine, O.B.E. For services to Jazz Music.
- Robert Anthony Plant, Singer and Songwriter. For services to Music.
- Paul John Potts, Executive Chairman, Press Association. For services to Journalism.
- John David Priest, Deputy Strategic Sourcing Director, Corporate IT, Department for Work and Pensions. For public and voluntary service.
- David Prince, lately Chief Executive, Standards Board for England. For services to Local Government.
- Emeritus Professor Martin Charles Raff, F.R.S. For services to Life Sciences.
- Professor Anne Marie Rafferty, Dean, Florence Nightingale School of Nursing and Midwifery. For services to Healthcare.
- David Evan Roberts, M.B.E., Swimmer. For services to Disabled Sport.
- Dr. Sue Roberts, lately National Clinical Director for Diabetes. For services to Healthcare.
- Professor Thomas Michael Roberts, lately Chief Executive, Central Science Laboratory, Department for Environment, Food and Rural Affairs.
- Dr. Michael Gerald Galton Schluter. For charitable services through the Relationships Foundation and the Jubilee Centre in Cambridge.
- Finlay McMillan Scott, Chief Executive, General Medical Council. For public service.
- Ms Deborah Frances Shackleton, Group Chief Executive, Riverside Housing Group. For services to the Housing Sector.
- Professor Isobel Nicol Sharp, lately President, Institute of Chartered Accountants of Scotland and Partner, Deloitte. For services to the Accountancy Profession.
- Charles James Francis Sinclair, lately Chief Executive, Daily Mail and General Trust. For services to the Newspaper Industry.
- Dr. Indarjit Singh, O.B.E., Director, Network of Sikh Organisations (UK). For services to Inter-Faith and Community Relations.
- Andrew Michael Slade. For public service.
- Dr. Ian McKenzie Smith, O.B.E. For services to the Arts in Scotland.
- Ms Priscilla Snowball, chair and Chief Executive, Abbott Mead Vickers Group. For services to the Advertising Industry.
- David Whitlock Tanner, O.B.E., Performance Director, GB Rowing Team. For services to Sport.
- Professor Alexander Allan Templeton, Professor of Obstetrics and Gynaecology, University of Aberdeen. For services to Medicine.
- Jeremy Jack Thomas, Producer. For services to the Film Industry.
- Rosemary, Mrs. Thorp. For services to Education and to International Development.
- Robert Upton, Secretary-General, Royal Town Planning Institute. For public service.
- Marina Alandra, Lady Vaizey. For services to the Arts.
- John Esmond George Vaux, lately Speaker's Counsel, House of Commons.
- Professor Anthony James Venables, lately Chief Economist, Department for International Development.
- Anthony Watson, chairman, Strategic Investment Board Limited. For services to Economic Development in Northern Ireland.
- Professor Peter Neil Temple Wells, Research Professor and Senior Scientific Director, Institute of Medical Engineering and Medical Physics, University of Cardiff. For services to Healthcare Science.
- Bradley Marc Wiggins, O.B.E., Cyclist. For services to Sport.
- Professor Paul Wilkinson. For public service.
- Professor David Charles Woods, Principal Adviser, City Challenge. For services to Education.
- James Samuel Younger, lately chairman, Electoral Commission. For public service.

==== Officer of the Order of the British Empire (OBE) ====
Military Division

Royal Navy

- Commander David Daniel Acland RN
- Commander Mark Vincent Caretta RN
- Captain Lynne Gibbon ARRC, Queen Alexandra's Royal Naval Nursing Service
- Commander David Hadfield
- Commander Stephen John Murray
- Commander James Le Seelleur Perks
- Captain (formerly Cmdr) Gavin Scrimgeour Pritchard
- Captain John Blain Minto Rees

Army

- Lt Col Scott Ross Adams, Staff and Personnel Support Branch, AGC
- Col Rakesh Kumar Bhabutta, Royal Army Medical Corps
- Acting Col Andrew Mark Blowers, Surrey Army Cadet Force
- Acting Col John Barrie Davies, Glamorgan Army Cadet Force
- Lt Col Edward Richard Bickersteth Heal, REME
- Col Philip James Hubbard, Royal Army Medical Corps
- Col James Timothy Edward Illingworth, Army Air Corps
- Lt Col Jonathan Charles Probert MBE, Royal Logistic Corps
- Col Peter Samuel Marshal Rawlinson TD, Royal Army Medical Corps, Territorial Army
- Lt Col Alistair John Thomson, Education and Training Services Branch, AGC

Royal Air Force

- Wing Commander Dean Richard Andrew
- Wing Commander Lawrence John Bennett
- Wing Commander Ian Duguid
- Wing Commander Andrew Charles Hine
- Wing Commander Richard David Mason MBE
- Wing Commander Peter William McAlpine
- Wing Commander Simon Peter Rochelle DFC

Civil Division

- Professor Thomas Alan Acton, Professor of Romani Studies, University of Greenwich. For services to Education.
- Rebecca Adlington, Swimmer. For services to Sport.
- Jonathan Patrick Adair Adnams, Executive chairman, Adnams plc. For services to Corporate Social Responsibility.
- Gideon Amos, Chief Executive, Town and Country Planning Association. For services to Sustainable Development.
- Elizabeth, Mrs. Antrobus, Headteacher, Henry Cavendish Primary School, Lambeth, London. For services to Education.
- Professor David Croisdale-Appleby. For public and voluntary service.
- Catherine, Mrs. Archer, lately executive director, West Yorkshire Police Authority. For services to the Police.
- Joan, Mrs. Asby, M.B.E. For services to Community Development in West Wales.
- Professor Deborah Ashby, Professor of Medical Statistics and Clinical Trials, Imperial College, London. For services to Medicine.
- Diana Athill, Literary Editor and Author. For services to Literature.
- Sarah Ayton, M.B.E., Sailor. For services to Sport.
- David Bailey, lately Tax Inspector, H.M. Revenue and Customs. For public and voluntary service.
- Martyn Murray Baker, lately Director of Economic Development, City of London Corporation. For services to Local Government.
- George Christopher Band. For services to Mountaineering and to Charity.
- Dr. Alan Barber. For services to the Environment.
- Lucinda Jane, Mrs. Barnett, chairman, Magistrates'Association. For services to the Administration of Justice.
- Victoria, Mrs. Barnsley, Chief Executive, HarperCollins UK. For services to the Publishing Industry.
- Keith Leslie Barwell, lately chairman, West Northamptonshire Development Corporation. For services to Local Government.
- Ms Gillian Rose Beasley, Chief Executive, Peterborough City Council. For services to Local Government.
- David Bell, Senior Programme Manager, Somalia, Department for International Development.
- Catherine Susan, Mrs. Beswick, Head of Healthcare, H.M. Young OVenders' Institution Huntercombe, Oxfordshire. For services to Healthcare.
- Dr. Anita Kumari Bhalla, D.L., editor, Public Space Broadcasting BBC. For services to Broadcasting.
- Dr. Kuldip Kaur Bharj, Senior Lecturer in Midwifery and Lead Midwife for Education, School of Healthcare, Leeds University. For services to Healthcare and to the community in Leeds.
- Keith Raymond Blackwell, Principal, Esher Sixth Form College, Surrey. For services to local and national Further Education.
- Ms Helene Reardon-Bond, Head of Gender Equality Policy, Government Equalities Office. For public and voluntary service.
- Robert Michael Bowley, lately Project Team Head of Division, Identity and Passport Service, Home Office.
- Ms Caroline Breakey. For services to Rural and Community Development in Northern Ireland.
- Dr. Isabel Bruce, Vice-chair, University of the West of Scotland. For services to Higher Education in Scotland and Malawi.
- Professor Anthony Applemore Mornington Bryer, emeritus Professor of Byzantine Studies, University of Birmingham. For services to Scholarship.
- Nicholas Buckland. For services to Technology and Innovation.
- Ian Kellman Bynoe, Commissioner, Independent Police Complaints Commission. For public service.
- John Michael Caines. For services to Entrepreneurship and to Business in the South West.
- Jane, Mrs. Caldwell, lately Headteacher, Highfield Community Primary School, Sunderland. For services to Education.
- Rodney John Calvert, managing director, Millbrook Proving Ground. For services to the Automotive Industry.
- Professor Sara Carter. For services to Women Entrepreneurs.
- Ms Joyce Margaret Catterick. For services to the Citizens' Advice Bureau and to the community in West Yorkshire.
- Adrian Oswald Wynn Cave. For services to the community in Ealing, London.
- Dr. James Alan Harvard Cave, General Medical Practitioner, Newbury. For services to Healthcare in Berkshire.
- Professor Martin Cave, Warwick Business School. For public service.
- Dr. Nadia Chambers, Consultant Nurse for Older People, Southampton University Hospitals NHS Trust. For services to Healthcare.
- Michael Christensen, lately Senior Local Manager, North West and Midlands, H.M. Revenue and Customs.
- Jean, Mrs. Combes. For services to Phenology.
- Dr. Diane Coyle. For services to Economics.
- Nicholas Pury Cust, Joint managing director, Superbreak plc. For services to the Tourist Industry.
- Ronald Daniel. For voluntary service to Victims of Crime in Scotland.
- Cheryl Linda, Mrs. Danson, chair, England Netball. For services to Sport.
- Keith James Datchler. For services to Conservation and to Environmental Land Management.
- Ms Katherine Ann Davies, Strategic Director, Nottinghamshire County Drug and Alcohol Action Team. For services to Disadvantaged People.
- Dr. Stephen Roger Davis, Lecturer in Psychology, University College London. For services to Children with Communication DiYculties.
- Leslie Dawson. For services to the Energy and Water Industries.
- Alan Edward Deighton, lately Safety Advice Manager, Department for Transport.
- Kelvyn Derrick. For services to Engineering in the South West and to International Trade.
- Uday Kumar Dholakia. For services to Business and to the community in Leicestershire.
- Dr. Rhidian Dowdle, lately Consultant Physician, Cardiology, Cwm Taff NHS Trust. For services to Medicine.
- Geoffrey Drage. For services to Intellectual Property Rights.
- Robert Drew, Headteacher, Gearies Infant School, Redbridge, Essex. For services to Education.
- Miss Ann Irene Duddy, Director of Nursing, Altnagelvin Hospital Trust. For services to Healthcare in Northern Ireland and Overseas.
- David Alexander Dunkley, lately Inspector of Salmon and Freshwater Fisheries for Scotland, Scottish Executive.
- Fergus Early, Founder and artistic director, Green Candle Dance Company. For services to Dance.
- Councillor Meral Hussein Ece, London Borough of Islington. For services to Local Government.
- Professor Marcial Hernan Echenique. For services to Urban and Regional Planning.
- Stephen Kenneth Ellison, lately Clerk of the Parliamentary Archives, Houses of Parliament.
- Richard Emery. For services to Broadcasting and to Charity.
- Ms Carole Eniffer, Policy Adviser, Violent Crime Unit, Crime and Drug Strategy Directorate, Home Office.
- Duncan Fisher, Chief Executive, Fatherhood Institute. For services to Children.
- Professor Alfonso John Forte. For services to Food Safety.
- Robert Norman Froud, Service Head, Cultural Services, Somerset County Council. For services to Local Government.
- Thomas Alan Fry, Chief Executive, South Wales Police Authority. For services to the Police.
- Elizabeth, Mrs. Gaere, Head, Joint Donor Office, Southern Sudan, Department for International Development
- Mrs Jane Mary Gardam, Author. For services to Literature.
- Catherine, Mrs. Gilchrist, lately Head of Civil Service Pensions, Department of Finance and Personnel, Northern Ireland Executive. For public and voluntary service.
- Janet Mary, Mrs. Dowlen-Gilliland. For services to the Soldiers', Sailors' and Airmen's Families Association.
- Michael John Glover, Arup Fellow and Technical Director and Deputy Project Director, Channel Tunnel Rail Link. For services to Engineering.
- Kathleen Mary, Mrs. Gooding, lately Senior Early Years Inspector, Wolverhampton Local Authority. For services to local and national Early Years Education.
- Dr. Susan Elizabeth Gregory, Consultant in Dental Public Health, Bedfordshire and Hertfordshire. For services to Healthcare.
- Salima, Mrs. Hafejee, director, Bradford Youth Development Partnership. For services to Community Relations in West Yorkshire.
- Pauline Ann, Mrs. Halliday. For services to Local Government in the City of London.
- David John Hampson, Principal, Tollbar Business and Enterprise College, North East Lincolnshire. For services to Education.
- Professor Barry William Hancock, Professor of Oncology, Sheffield University and SheYeld Teaching Hospital NHS Foundation Trust. For services to Medicine.
- Roger Harvey. For voluntary service to the community in Halifax, West Yorkshire.
- Stuart Henry Haynes, Grade B1, Ministry of Defence.
- Professor Christopher John Heginbotham, lately Chief Executive, Mental Health Act Commission. For services to Healthcare.
- Brigadier John Hemsley. For voluntary service to the St. John Ambulance Brigade and to the community in Somerset.
- Ms Melanie Henwood, Vice-chair, General Social Care Council. For services to Social Care.
- Dr. Alan John Heyes, lately deputy director, International Nuclear Policy and Programmes, Department for Business, Enterprise and Regulatory Reform.
- Professor Carole Hillenbrand, F.R.S.E., lately Head of Department of Islamic and Middle Eastern Studies, University of Edinburgh. For services to Higher Education.
- David Hinchliffe, lately Director, Future of Inspection Project, Ofsted, Department for Children, Schools and Families.
- Michael John Holloway. Regional Director, Consular and Visa Services for Iberia, British Embassy, Madrid.
- John Alan Holmes, Q.F.S.M., Programme Director, North East Fire and Rescue Authorities. For services to Local Government.
- Ms Marianne Hood (Mrs. Cutts), chair, Independent Advisory Beacon Panel. For services to Local Government.
- Dr. Ursula Howard, lately Director, National Research and Development Centre for Adult Literacy and Numeracy. For services to Further Education.
- Christopher Gerard Hughes. For public service.
- Howard Hughes. For charitable services.
- Mrs Ellen Hunter, Cycling Pilot Guide. For services to Disabled Sport.
- Dr. Musharraf Hussain, director, Karimia Institute, Nottingham. For services to Community Relations.
- Andrew Charles Hutchinson, Executive Principal, Parkside Federation, Cambridgeshire. For services to Education.
- Dr. Robert Jackson, lately Head of Radioactive Substances Division, Department for Environment, Food and Rural AVairs.
- Ruth Margaret, Mrs. James, lately Head of People Development, TNT. For services to Skills Training and Investors in People.
- Councillor Ann Marie John, Member, London Borough of Brent. For services to Local Government.
- Ms Jill Johnstone, Director of Policy, National Consumer Council. For services to Consumers.
- Professor Elphin Wynne Jones, Principal, Harper Adams University College. For services to local and national Agricultural Higher Education.
- Rhydian James Morgan-Jones. For services to the Horseracing Industry.
- Susan Elizabeth, Mrs. Jones, Head of Public Libraries Children Services, Hertfordshire County Council. For services to Local Government.
- Ms Lakhbir Kaur (Lucky Dhillon). For services to Asian Broadcasting and to the Media.
- Rosemary, Mrs. Kelly, chairman, Arts Council of Northern Ireland. For services to the Arts.
- Brian Richard Calvert Kemp. For services to International Trade in the South West.
- Jacqui, Mrs. Kennedy, Director of Regulatory Services, Birmingham City Council. For services to Local Government.
- Darren Kenny, Cyclist. For services to Disabled Sport.
- Christine Margaret, Mrs. Kent, lately Grade B2, Ministry of Defence.
- Asha, Mrs. Khemka, Principal and Chief Executive, West Nottinghamshire College. For services to Further Education.
- Sascha Kindred, Swimmer. For services to Disabled Sport.
- Edward King, lately Principal Technical Policy Adviser, Sustainable Buildings Division, Department for Communities and Local Government. For public and voluntary service.
- David Kynaston. For services to the Electronics Industry.
- James Anthony Lake, Q.P.M., lately Chief Constable, Lincolnshire Police. For services to the Police.
- Philip Lane, Chief Executive, Paralympics GB. For services to Sport.
- Lui on Lee. For voluntary service to the Chinese Community in Forth Valley, Stirlingshire.
- Ms Christine Lenehan, director, Council for Disabled Children. For services to disability ossues.
- Captain Michael Charles Gordon-Lennox, chairman, St Dunstan's. For voluntary service to Visually Impaired Ex-Servicemen and Women.
- Bernard Lewis. For charitable services.
- Carl Henry Lis. For services to the community in the Yorkshire Dales.
- Colonel Thomas Derek Christopher Lloyd T.D., D.L. For services to the West Midland Reserve Forces and Cadets' Association.
- John Anthony Lockett, lately Principal, Grosvenor Grammar School, Belfast. For services to Education in Northern Ireland.
- John Logan, Principal Scientific Officer, Forensic Science Northern Ireland, Northern Ireland Office.
- Dr. Paul Gerard Logan, Principal Specialist Inspector, Health and Safety Executive, Department for Work and Pensions. For public and voluntary service.
- Dr. Andrew John Low. For services to the Defence Industry.
- Ms Val Lowman, Head of Community Development and Sustainability, Bovis Lend. For services to the Construction Industry and to Skills Training.
- Hector MacKenzie, lately Head of Patient Focus and International Issues, Health Directorate, Scottish Executive.
- Ms Susan Margaret Graham Matheson. For services to Community Justice and to the Voluntary Sector in Scotland.
- Kerry Ann, Mrs. Maxwell, Chief Executive, Whitehaven Community Trust, Cumbria. For services to Young People.
- Professor Alan Keith Maynard, chairman, York Hospitals NHS Foundation Trust. For services to the NHS.
- Brian McCargo, Q.P.M. For services to Sport and to the Special Olympics in Northern Ireland.
- Rurik Miles Marsden. Former 1st Secretary (Development), British Embassy, Rangoon.
- Iain David McGeachy (John Martyn), Singer and Songwriter. For services to Music.
- Ms Aileen McGlynn, M.B.E., Cyclist. For services to Disabled Sport.
- Professor Donna May Mead, Dean, Faculty of Health, Sport and Science and Professor of Nursing, University of Glamorgan. For services to Healthcare.
- Professor Philip Scott Mellor, Head of Department of Arbovirology, Institute for Animal Health. For services to Science.
- David William Midgley. For services to Business and to the community in Tyne and Wear.
- Ms Nicola Jane Milican, artistic director, New Moves International Ltd. For services to Performance Art.
- Hannah, Mrs. Miller. For voluntary service to the Welfare of Children.
- Janet, Mrs. Miller. For charitable services.
- Ms Katrina Jane Mitchell, Theatre Director. For services to Drama.
- Dr. Sally Sarah Jane Montgomery. For services to the Science Discovery Centre in Northern Ireland.
- Rosaleen, Mrs. Moore. For public service in Northern Ireland.
- Paul Morrell. For services to Architecture and to the Built Environment.
- Charles Morrison, board member, Scottish Enterprise. For services to Economic Development.
- Ms Sara Aye Moung, Head, Police Reward and Employee Relations Section, Police Reform and Resources Directorate, Home Office.
- Dr. Robert Mulvaney, Glaciologist, Physical Sciences Division, British Antarctic Survey. For services to Science.
- Kumar Muthalagappan, managing director, Pearl Hotels and Restaurants Group. For services to the Hospitality Industry.
- Councillor Terence Frank Neville, J.P., Cabinet Member, London Borough of Enfield. For services to Local Government.
- David Robert Newsome, Headteacher, Dyffryn Taf Secondary School, Whitland, Carmarthenshire. For services to Education and to Young People.
- Robert John Nicholas, Programme Manager, Proportionate Dispute Resolution, Her Majesty's Courts Service, Ministry of Justice.
- Grahame Richard Nix, chief operating officer, Marshall Aerospace. For services to the Defence Industry.
- David St. John O'Carroll, lately Deputy Branch Head, Health and Social Care Regulation, Department of Health.
- Christine, Mrs. Owen, Headteacher, Bartley Green School, Birmingham. For services to Education.
- Lynette Isabel, Mrs. Owen. For services to the Publishing Industry and to International Trade.
- Edward Leslie Hinton Palfrey, medical director, Frimley Park Hospital NHS Foundation Trust. For services to Healthcare.
- Stephen Mackenzie Park, Manager, British Olympic Sailing Team. For services to Sport.
- Peter Parks, Photographer. For services to Natural History and to the Film Industry.
- Professor Alan Alexander Paterson, Professor of Law, Strathclyde University. For services to Legal Education and to Law.
- Adam Erskine Peat, lately Public Services Ombudsman or Wales.
- Iain Bryden Percy, M.B.E., Sailor. For services to Sport.
- Professor Andrew Pettigrew, lately Dean, School of Management, University of Bath. For services to local and national Higher Education.
- George Andrew Pindar, D.L., chairman, G. A. Pindar and Sons. For services to Business and to the community in Scarborough, North Yorkshire.
- Julian Mark Piper, lately Director of Extended and Integrated Services, ContinYou. For services to Children and Young People.
- Robin Stanle Pitman, lately Grade B1, Ministry of Defence.
- William James Poole. For services to Economic Development in Northern Ireland.
- Elizabeth Brown, Mrs. Porter, Chief Librarian, South Eastern Education and Library Board. For services to Local Government in Northern Ireland.
- Anis Rahman. For voluntary service to Bangladeshi People.
- Professor Andrew Madan Ramroop, Savile Row Tailor. For services to Bespoke Tailoring and Training.
- Peter James Rankin, Legal Adviser, Belfast Buildings Preservation Trust. For voluntary service to Heritage in Northern Ireland.
- Timothy Robert Reddish, M.B.E., National Performance Director for Disability Swimming. For services to Sport.
- Dennis Rees, director, Tenant Participation Advisory Service. For services to Social Housing.
- Professor Graham Charles Rees, Professor of English and Drama, Queen Mary University of London. For service to Scholarship.
- Dr. Randal William Richards, lately Chief Executive, Research Councils UK. For services to Science.
- Brigadier Peter Neil Ralli Stewart-Richardson, M.B.E. For services to Humanitarian Aid in Afghanistan and to the Army Benevolent Fund in Norfolk.
- Dr. Geoffrey Ridgway. For services to Microbiology.
- Ms Fiona Ritchie, Learning Disability Adviser, Healthcare Commission. For services to Vulnerable People.
- Ms Hilary Riva, Chief Executive, British Fashion Council. For services to the Fashion Industry.
- Ms Sarah Elizabeth Robinson, Principal and Chief Executive, Darlington College. For services to Further Education.
- Stephen Rodford, Senior Manager A, H.M. Prison Whitemoor, Cambridgeshire, Ministry of Justice. Jacqueline,
- Mrs. Ronchetti, Principal Private Secretary, Crown Prosecution Service.
- Ms Joanne Roney, Chief Executive, Wakefield City Council. For services to Local Government.
- Marilyn, Mrs. Rydstrom, lately Director-General, People's Dispensary for Sick Animals. For services to Animal Welfare.
- Ms Gail Josephine Sackloff. For services to Fashion Exports.
- Trevor Kenneth Salmon, City Treasurer, Belfast City Council. For services to Local Government.
- Ms Lucy Elizabeth Sayce, Chief Executive, RADAR. For services to disabled people.
- Miss Sylvia Diana Scarf. For voluntary service to the Anglican Church and to Guiding in Wales.
- The Reverend Adam Scott, T.D. For public and voluntary service.
- Thomas Scott, chairman, Greater Shankill Partnership. For services to the community in Northern Ireland.
- Ms Judith Alexandra Anne Serota. For services to the Spitalfields Festival, London.
- Michael Sheen, Actor. For services to Drama.
- Dr. Jonathan Paul Sheffield, medical director, University Hospitals Bristol NHS Foundation Trust. For service to the NHS.
- Howard Gordon Shelley, Concert Pianist and Conductor. For services to Classical Music.
- Judith Ann, Mrs. Shelley, lately Headteacher, Rawmarsh Nursery and Children's Centre, Rotherham. For services to Early Years Education.
- Diane Edwina, Mrs. Sherwood, Manager, Optimum Business Model, Crown Prosecution Service.
- Professor David Mark Shucksmith, Professor of Planning, Newcastle University. For services to Rural Development and to Crofting.
- Brian Wentworth Sinnamon, Business Manager, Judicial Services Group, Northern Ireland Court Service, Ministry of Justice. For public and voluntary service.
- Judith, Mrs. Sischy, director, Scottish Council of Independent Schools. For services to Education and to the Voluntary Sector.
- David Sleep, Head of Unit, National Strategies Management Team, Schools Directorate, Department for Children, Schools and Families.
- Susan Gwynneth, Mrs. Smith, lately chair, Local Government Boundary Commission for Wales. For services to Local Government.
- Ms Carole Snee. For services to Urban Regeneration in East London.
- Geoff Snow. For services to the Construction Industry and to Apprenticeships in Wales.
- Ms Boni Patricia Sones. For services to Broadcasting and to the Public Relations Industry.
- Councillor Nicholas Stanton, leader, London Borough of Southwark. For services to Local Government.
- Alexander Stephen, Chief Executive, Dundee City Council. For services to Local Government.
- Paul Stephenson. For services to Equal Opportunities and to Community Relations in Bristol.
- Neil Laurie Stoddart, managing director, A. K. Stoddart Ltd. For services to the Meat Industry in Scotland.
- Sarah Joanne, Mrs. Storey, M.B.E., Cyclist. For services to Disabled Sport.
- Adam Suddaby, Vice-Principal, Leicester College. For services to local and national Further Education.
- Ben Jeffrey Peter Summerskill, For services to Equality and Diversity.
- Michele, Mrs. Sutton, Principal, Bradford College. For services to Further Education and to Community Relations.
- Elizabeth Anne, Mrs. Taylor, lately Director, Department for Children Lifelong Learning and Skills, Welsh Assembly Government. For public and voluntary service.
- Hugh Taylor, Chief Executive, Hilmar Hotel Management. For services to the Tourist and Hospitality Industries.
- Ian George Taylor, District Manager Glasgow, Jobcentre Plus, Department for Work and Pensions.
- Thomas Thomson, lately chairman, Royal Scottish National Orchestra. For services to Music.
- Clifford Christoffel Todd, Grade B1, Ministry of Defence.
- Ms Valerie Gladys Vamplew, Deputy Operations Director, H.M. Revenue and Customs.
- Miss Jennifer Rowan van Tinteren, Team Leader, Accessibility Solutions Team, Department for Work and Pensions.
- Arnold Roy Vandermeer. For voluntary service to the community in Hertfordshire.
- Ms Sian Caroline Vasey, director, Ealing Centre for Independent Living. For services to disabled people.
- Dr. Peter Warburton, Director of Sport, University of Durham. For services to Higher Education and to Sport.
- Miss Sarah Kate Webb, M.B.E., Sailor. For services to Sport.
- Professor Christopher Welsh, Chief Operating Officer, Sheffield Teaching Hospital NHS Foundation Trust. For services to the NHS.
- Susan, Mrs. West, lately Headteacher, Millbrook Primary School, Stalybridge, Cheshire. For services to Education.
- Stephen Henry White, director, Business Strategy, UK Atomic Energy Authority. For services to the Nuclear Industry.
- Councillor Bernard James Whittle, Member, Fylde South, Lancashire County Council. For services to Local Government.
- Peter Wilding. For public service.
- Denise Jennifer, Mrs. Wilkinson. For services to the Voluntary Sector.
- Professor Richard Andrew Williams, Pro-Vice-Chancellor, University of Leeds. For services to Science and to Engineering.
- Stephen David Williams, M.B.E., Rower. For services to Sport.
- Karen, Mrs. Winfield, Team Leader, Student Loans Company Strategic Relationship Team, Department for Innovation, Universities and Skills. For public and voluntary service.
- Dr. Robert James David Winter, medical director, East of England Strategic Health Authority. For services to the NHS.
- Ms Wendy Wright, Principal, Macclesfield College. For services to Further Education.
- Keith Young, Policy Lead for Adult Critical Care Services, Department of Health.

Diplomatic Service and Overseas List

- Nicholas Jonathan Alexander, First Secretary, Foreign and Commonwealth Office.
- George Alkiviades David. For services to UK/Greek relations in the field of education.
- Dr. Alexander William Lowndes De Waal. For services to development and conflict resolution in Africa.
- Professor David Geraint Evans, Professor of Materials Science, Beijing University of Chemical Technology. For services to international science and UK/China Relations.
- Michael Ernesto Francino, lately Consultant Team Leader, Department for International Development. For services to economic reform in Iraq.
- Patrick Hugo Gray. For services to British nuclear non- proliferation initiatives in Russia and the Commonwealth Independent States.
- Dr. John Anthony Hemery Director, Centre for Diplomatic Studies. For services to British interests overseas.
- David Alexander James Hepworth, Q.G.M., lately Senior Investigations Adviser, British Embassy, Kabul. For services to the Police in Afghanistan.
- Michael John Holloway, Regional Director, Consular and Visa Services for Iberia, British Embassy, Madrid. Ms Ann Kenrick, Secretary-General, British Section, Franco-British Council. For services to promoting Franco-British relations.
- Iftikhar Ahmed Khan. For services to UK/Bangladesh trade and development relations and corporate social responsibility.
- Cheryl-Ann Elizabeth, Mrs. Lister, lately chairperson and chief executive officer, Bermuda Monetary Authority. For services to promoting sound financial regulation in Bermuda.
- Rurik Miles Marsden, lately First Secretary (Development), British Embassy, Rangoon.
- Jarlath Stephen Norman, First Secretary, Foreign and Commonwealth OYce.
- Charles John Sinclair Nuttall, lately Director, British Council, Colombia.
- William James Paterson, lately EU Chief Police Adviser and Team Leader, Darfur. For services in support of the African Union Peacekeeping Mission to Darfur.
- Gary LeRoy Phillips, Consultant. For public service in Bermuda.
- Derek Laurence Powell, managing director, International Training Services. For services to training.
- Paul Desmond Sherar, lately Director, Visa Services Operations for the Asia Pacific Region, British Embassy, Beijing.
- Professor James Arthur Ainscow Stockwin, Nissan Professor, Modern Japanese Studies and director, Nissan Institute of Japanese Studies, Oxford University. For services to academic excellence and the promotion of UK/Japanese understanding.
- Rupert Robert Sword, chairman and Regional Head, Latin America Schroder Investment Management, Schroders plc. For services to British commercial interests and to the British community in Argentina.
- Andrew Robert Hay Thomson, First Secretary, British Embassy, Bogota.
- David Richard Townsend, First Secretary, Foreign and Commonwealth Office.
- Professor David Warburton, Professor of Paediatric Surgery, Children's Hospital Los Angeles. For services to UK/USA collaboration on healthcare research.
- Nicholas Charles Young, journalist, Researcher and Trainer for Aid Agencies. For services to sustainable development and to civil society in China.

==== Members of the Order of the British Empire (MBE) ====
Military Division

- Squadron Leader Steven Abbott, RAFVR(T)
- Lt (now Lt. Cdr) William John Adams
- WO Class 1 Air Engineer Mechanic Martin Bailey
- WO Class 1 Warfare Specialist (Abovewater Warfare Weapons) Robert Bainbridge
- CPO Weapon Eng Mechanic (Radio)(Submarine) Paul Burton
- PO Air Eng Mechanic David Robert James Dallimore
- WO Class 1 Warfare Specialist (Sensors Submarine) John Strannigan Dickie
- WO Class 2 (Acting WO Class 1) Steven Graham Eaton RM
- Lt-Cmdr Derek John Login, Royal Naval Reserve, Sea Cadet Corps.
- Majr. John David Maddison RM
- WO Class 2 Eng Technician (Marine Eng Submarine) Allan Lindsay Mason
- WO Class 1 Warfare Specialist (Abovewater Warfare Weapons) Paul Mounsor
- Major (acting Lt-Col) Alexander Bruce Murray RM
- Captain (acting Major) Martin David Tidman RM
- Staff Sergeant Glen John Adams
- Captain Michael Paul Eamon Angove
- Warrant Officer Class 1 Robin David Bartlett
- Major Hugh Benson
- Acting Lieutenant Colonel Jeremy Graham Bromfield
- Major Gavin Derek Brown
- Sergeant Raymond Burke
- Major Kenneth Campbell
- Major Jon Cadey Spencer Cheek
- Major Andrew David Cox
- Sergeant Stephen John Crighton
- Major Jody Philip Davies
- Lieutenant Colonel Timothy John Davies
- Major William Hywel Lewis Davies
- Sergeant Justin Paul Dine
- Staff Sergeant Paul Duffin
- Captain Neil Anthony England
- Major Rodney Victor Gray
- Major Nigel Patrick Hanley
- Captain Colin Andrew Howard
- Major Toby Alfred Warde Ingram
- Acting Major Barry Johnson
- Sergeant Shane Anthony Jones
- Major William Robert Kefford
- Major Peter Alexander Little BEM
- Major Mathew Richard Pemberton MacKenzie
- Lance Corporal Angeline Patricia Matley
- Major James McClung
- Major Bryan Mialkowsky CD
- Warrant Officer Class 1 Andrew David Mills
- Captain Dean Richard Murch
- Lieutenant Colonel John Crispin Morison Orr
- Warrant Officer Class 2 Geoffrey Paine
- Warrant Officer Class 1 Colin Neil Preece
- Staff Sergeant Christopher Price
- Warrant Officer Class 2 Robert Proctor
- Major Thomas Robert David Ridgway
- Major Paul Shields
- Major Michael John Short
- Colour Sergeant Paul Gregory Simpson
- Captain Neil Stuart Thomas
- Major Darren Lars Thompson
- Major Jonathan Peter Thorn
- Major Phillip Shepheard-Walwyn
- The Reverend Steven, Royal Army Chaplain's Department
- Acting Lieutenant Colonel Lewis John Williams TD
- Lieutenant Colonel William Stewart Codrington Wright
- Flying Officer Steven John Abbott
- Squadron Leader Steven Andrew Berry
- Flight Sergeant Robert Thomas Bray
- Warrant Officer Robert Michael Byrne
- Flight Lieutenant Matthew Alan Clark
- Chief Technician Nicholas John Deavin
- Warrant Officer David Elder
- Squadron Leader Robert Andrew Ellen
- Warrant Officer Stewart John Farmer
- Sergeant Paul Anthony Fawcett
- Squadron Leader Andrew Thomas Fell
- Squadron Leader Lewis Gusterson
- Squadron Leader Anthony Christian Keeling
- Squadron Leader Sean Christopher Leach
- Squadron Leader David Thomas Morgan
- Warrant Officer Mark Antony Salter
- Sergeant Justin Hartland Scholes
- Squadron Leader Andrew John White

Civil Division

- Pauline Adams, for services to the North East Ambulance Service
- Dr David Francis William Adey. General Medical Practitioner, Southampton, for services to Healthcare
- Barbara Adlington. Higher Executive Officer, Jobcentre Plus, Department for Work and Pensions, for public and voluntary service
- Dr Emmanuel Akuffo. Consultant Psychiatrist, Waltham Forest, for services to Medicine
- Harold Alderman. Boxing Historian, for services to Sporting Heritage
- Enam Ali, for services to the Indian and Bangladeshi Restaurant Industry
- Ishtiaq Ali, for services to the community in Lancashire
- Kathleen Margaret Norah Allen, for voluntary service to People with Disabilities in West Sussex
- Pauline Allen, for services to the Independent Monitoring Board, HM Prison Ford and to the community in West Sussex
- Peter Edwin Allen, for public service
- Frances Louise Allingham. Clerk and Committee assistant, House of Commons
- Isabel McKenna Chalmers Anderson, for voluntary service to Music in Ayrshire
- Jenny Arwas, for charitable services
- Sheila Mary Astbury, for voluntary service to the community in Shrewsbury, Shropshire
- Meg Anne Atkinson, for services to the Soldiers' and Airmen's Scripture Reader Association, RAF Lyneham, Wiltshire
- Jean Atton, for voluntary service to the Royal British Legion in Leicestershire
- Robert Austin. Founder and director, Formula Schools Design and Technology Competition, for services to Education
- John Aves, former Wheelchair Technician, The Duke of Cornwall Spinal Centre, for services to people with disabilities
- Patricia Susan Hazel Baker. Director, Pyramid Educational Consultants UK, for services to Children and Young People
- Joanna Margaret Bancroft. Director of Personnel and Development, Cumbria Constabulary, for services to the Police
- Clive Anthony Barber. Manager E, HM Prison and Young Offenders' Institution, Reading, Ministry of Justice
- Brenda Barker, for voluntary service to Stowlawn Tenants' and Residents' Association, Bilston, Wolverhampton
- Eric Keith Barkham, for voluntary service to Sport and to the community in Virginia Water, Surrey
- Monique Claire Marie Barnes, for voluntary service to the community in Bury St. Edmunds, Suffolk
- Hilary Basterfield. Executive Officer, Jobcentre Plus, Department for Work and Pensions
- Kenneth Bates, former chairman, University of the Third Age Nottingham, for voluntary service to Adult Education
- Brenda Valerie Beach. Founder, Gateway Club, for services to People with Learning Disabilities in Hertfordshire
- Elizabeth Beck. Chair, Lemington Community Association, for voluntary service to the community in Newcastle upon Tyne
- Pamela Mary Becke. Special Constable, West Mercia Constabulary, for voluntary service to the Police in Bridgnorth, Shropshire
- Dr Marlene Anne Behennah, for voluntary service to the community in Mevagissey, Cornwall
- Dorothy Mary Bell, for services to the Heritage Centre in Bellingham, Northumberland
- Jennifer Bell, former Governor, Harrington Hill Primary School, Hackney, London, for voluntary service to Education
- Shirley Diane Bellis, for voluntary service to the community in North Wales
- Sean Bennett. Fleet Manager, British Embassy, Baghdad, for services to charitable activities in Iraq
- Valerie Anne Bennett, for voluntary service to the community in Whatlington, East Sussex
- Maxine Benson. Director, Everywoman Ltd, for services to Women's Enterprise
- Dr Chitra Bharucha, for services to the Animal Feed Industry
- Dr Parvin Bhatia. General Medical Practitioner, London Borough of Richmond, for services to Healthcare
- Christine Ann Bickerdyke. Prison Officer, HM Prison Wakefield, Ministry of Justice
- Douglas Oliver Birch, for voluntary service to the community in Brownhills, West Midlands
- Patricia Bird. Chair, Hexham Community Association, for voluntary service to the community in Reading, Berkshire
- Gerald Bishop. Employee Development manager, Cobham plc, for services to the Defence Industry
- Mark Bishop, for public service
- Cyril Blackman, for services to the Royal Marines Association
- Gerald Blacoe. Export manager, Fogarty (Filled Products) Ltd, for services to International Trade and to the community in Lincolnshire
- Pamela Blofield, for voluntary service to the community in Shrewsbury, Shropshire
- Robert Brian Bloomfield, for voluntary service to Rugby Union in Northern Ireland. (Dunmurry, Belfast)
- Susan Blyth, for services to YMCA and to the community in Warrington, Cheshire
- Eziethamae Eleanor Bodden, for services to the community, Cayman Islands
- Simon Bolam, for services to the Insurance Industry
- Elisebeth Ann Bold. Executive Officer, Pension, Disability and Carers' Service, Department for Work and Pensions, for public and voluntary service
- Elizabeth Anne Bolton, for services to Animal Welfare
- Michael John Bolton. Undermaster, Sevenoaks School, Kent, for services to Education
- Stanley Boor, for voluntary service to the community in North Lincolnshire
- Erwin Bottomley, former Deputy Mine manager, National Coal Mining Museum, for services to Heritage
- Robert Andrew Boulton. Chief Superintendent, Dorset Police, for services to the Police and to the community in Bournemouth
- Ann Bowen. Grade C1, Ministry of Defence, for public service
- Christine Boyle. Managing director, Lawell Asphalt Roofing, for services to Women's Enterprises in Northern Ireland
- Dr Jules Timothy Brabants. Canoeist, for services to Sport
- Alec Brader, former Leader, Revesby Summer Playscheme, Boston, Lincolnshire, for services to Young People
- Hilda Brailsford, for voluntary service to the community in Ironville, Nottinghamshire
- Ann Mary Brew, for charitable services
- Thomas David Briggs, for voluntary service to St. John Ambulance and to the community in Cheshire
- Margaret Bright, former International Student Support Officer, Sheffield Hallam University, for services to Higher Education
- Mark Bristow. Cyclist, for services to Disabled Sport
- Stephen Bristow. Joint Proprietor, GreenWood Forest Park, for services to the Tourist Industry in North Wales
- Isobel Mauveen Brodie, former Deputy Headteacher, Webster's High School, Angus, for services to Education
- Dr Timothy Andrew Broome, former Head, Target Division, ISIS Facility, Rutherford Appleton Laboratory, for services to Science
- Keith Brough. Special Constable, Lothian and Borders Police, for voluntary service to the Police
- Beryl Brown, former Library Manager, Wychwood Library, Oxfordshire, for services to Local Government
- Christina Brown. Senior Officer, HM Revenue and Customs, for public and voluntary service
- Linda Quinn
- Christopher Buckland, for voluntary service to the British Red Cross Society in Northern Ireland
- Garth Buckle. Business Links Team Co-ordinator, Hounslow Education Business Partnership, for services to Young People in West London
- Michael Bull. Teacher, Whitehall Primary School, for services to Education and to the community in Leicester
- Claude Bullingham, for voluntary service to the community in Whaddon, Cheltenham
- David Charles Bullock. Electronic Workshop Engineer, Institute of Hearing Research, Medical Research Council, for services to Science
- Carol Ann Burke, former manager E, HM Prison and Young Offenders' Institution Askham Grange, York, Ministry of Justice, for public and voluntary service
- Robert Burns. Business Development manager, Lancashire Constabulary, for services to the Police
- Terry Elliott Burns, for services to the Trade Union Movement and to the community in Burnley and Lancashire
- Tony Burns, for voluntary service to Amateur Boxing
- Lindsay Marie Burr, for services to Business and to the community in Ryedale, North Yorkshire
- Simon Burr. Vice-president, Engine Controls, Goodrich Corporation, for services to the Aerospace Industry
- James Walter Butler, for services to art
- William Tinsley Cairns, for services to Music in Northern Ireland
- Philicianno Callwood. Proprietor, Foxy's Bar and Restaurant, Entrepreneur and musician, for services to tourism, British Virgin Islands
- Helen Calvert. Executive Officer, Child Support Agency, Department for Work and Pensions, for public and voluntary service
- John Francis Carberry. Regional Development Officer, Royal National Institute for the Deaf, for services to Disabled People in Northern Ireland
- Amanda Estelle Carter, for voluntary service to the community in Leicester
- David John Carter. 1st Secretary, Foreign and Commonwealth Office
- Professor Ronald Allan Carter, University of Nottingham, for services to local and national Higher Education
- Kate Cartwright, for voluntary service to the Yorkshire and East Midlands Lay Observer Panel
- Sarah Castro, Community Safety Manager, Poplar Housing and Regeneration Community Association. For services to tackling Anti-Social Behaviour in East London.
- Gordon Blakley Cave, chair, Royal Victoria Hospital Belfast Liver Support Group. For charitable services to Healthcare.
- Janice Rosamund Cave, Director of Public Affairs, Royal Society for The Prevention of Accidents. For services to Health and Safety.
- Dawn Ellen Chapman, Nurse Consultant, Cambridge University Hospitals NHS Foundation Trust. For services to Breast Cancer Healthcare.
- Brian John Chappell. For public service.
- Sarah Chester. For services to the Arts.
- Muhammed Irfan Faizi Chishti, Imam, H.M. Prisons Forest Bank and Buckley Hall. For services to Muslim People.
- Mamun Rashid Chowdhury. For voluntary service to Asian Community Football in East London.
- Sophie Margaret Christiansen, Equestrian. For services to Disabled Sport.
- Edward Clancy, Cyclist. For services to sport.
- Irene Clark. For voluntary service to the Royal British Legion in Worcester Park, Surrey.
- Michael Clifford, Project Manager, Wheelbase Motor Project, Nottingham. For services to Young People.
- William Clift, J.P. For voluntary service to the communities in Castleford and Wakefield, West Yorkshire.
- Wendy Clifton, Grade D, Ministry of Defence.
- Lesley Jane Coffin, Head of Secretariat, Network Operations South East, Highways Agency, Department for Transport.
- Dennis Owen Cole. For voluntary service to Music and to the community in Weston-Super-Mare, Somerset.
- Katharine Coleman. For services to Glass Engraving.
- Sydney John Coleman. For voluntary service to St. John Ambulance in Warwickshire.
- Ronald Leslie Coltman. For voluntary service to the Sandford Parks Lido in Cheltenham, Gloucestershire.
- Eileen Conn. For services to the community in the London Borough of Southwark.
- Nadezda Conway, Non-Executive Director, Barnet and Chase Farm Hospitals. For services to the NHS and to the community in North London.
- Nicole Cooke, Cyclist. For services to Sport.
- Dr. Albert Roy Cooksey. For voluntary service to the Coniston Mountain Rescue Team in Cumbria.
- Wendy Cooling, co-founder, Bookstart Project. For services to Children's Literacy.
- Laurence John Harris Coombs. For voluntary service to the community in Bath.
- Mary Jenifer Cooper. For voluntary service to International Students in Cambridge.
- Patricia Astley-Cooper, Curator, Wandsworth Museum. For services to Heritage in South West London.
- Peter Daniel Cormack, lately Curator, William Morris Gallery. For services to Art and to Heritage.
- Lynette Costello, co-founder, Mothers Against Murder and Aggression. For services to Vulnerable People.
- Judith Cottam, lately Nurse Consultant (Stoma Care), Bedford Hospital NHS Trust. For services to Healthcare.
- Alan Cottle. For services to Children and Young People with Special Needs in Surrey.
- Bernard James Cotton, Director, Team GB Holding Camp. For services to Sport.
- Timothy Coulson. For services during the July 2005 London Bombings.
- Lynda Coulter, Senior Neonatal Nurse, Countess of Chester NHS Foundation Trust. For services to Healthcare.
- Alderman Cecil James Cousley. For services to the Boys' Brigade and to Local Government in Ballymoney, Northern Ireland.
- Linda Covey. For voluntary service to the British Red Cross Society in Warwickshire.
- Alan Craig, Inspector, International Team, UK Border Agency, Home Office. For public and voluntary service.
- Timothy John Craig. For public service.
- Wynne Creasy, Leader, Bexley Clerkship Practice, London Borough of Bexley. For services to Education.
- Professor Jonathan Crego. For public service.
- George Creighton. For services to Biomedical Research in Northern Ireland.
- Thomas Creighton, chairman, Northern Health and Social Services Council. For services to Social Care in Northern Ireland.
- Herbert Thomas Harold Cromack. For voluntary service to Agriculture and to the community in the Isle of Bute.
- Collin Crooks, Senior Information Access Manager, Department for Children, Schools and Families. For public and voluntary service.
- Joyce Crossan. For public service.
- Bruce Crowther. For services to Oxfam and to Fairtrade.
- Catherine Anne Townsend Storrs Cullis. For services to the Conservation of Ecclesiastical Heritage.
- Stanley Michael Cundle. For voluntary service to the Jewish community in Leeds.
- Jody Cundy, Cyclist. For services to Disabled Sport.
- Allan Roy Currall, Chairman of Governors, Kendrick School, Reading. For voluntary service to Education.
- David Niel Curwen. For services to the Environment and to the community in the Cotswolds.
- Martha Marina Dalglish. For services to Breast Cancer Patients in Merseyside.
- Anthony Frederick Dalton, Grade 7, Nationality Management Team, UK Border Agency, Home Office. For public and voluntary service.
- Pradip Kumar Datta, Founder, Wick Surgical Courses. For services to Medical Training.
- Professor Jagdish Dave. For services to Education and to Asian People.
- Marguerite Stella Davies. For voluntary service to the community in Aldeburgh, Suffolk.
- Terence Davies, lately Senior Executive Officer, Jobcentre Plus, Department for Work and Pensions. For public and voluntary service.
- Christopher Kevin Davis. For charitable services in Southampton.
- Marian Janet Davis, Teacher, Sexey's School. For services to the community in Queen Camel, Somerset.
- Pamela Dorothy Horridge-Deakin. Vice-president, Ibiza and Formentera Association for the Prevention of Cancer, for services to charitable activities in Ibiza and Formentera.
- Stephen Michael Deakin, Executive OYcer, Jobcentre. Plus, Department for Work and Pensions.
- James Frederick DeGale, Middleweight Boxer. For services to Sport.
- Andrew Dougal Dempster. For voluntary service to Victim Support in Scotland.
- David Francis De Val. For voluntary service to the community in Chinnor, Oxfordshire.
- William Alexander Dickson, Consultant, Plastic Surgeon and Director, Welsh Burns Centre, Abertawe Bro Morgannwg University NHS Trust. For services to Medicine.
- Leslie Barbara Dillingham. For voluntary service to Equestrian Sport.
- Ebrahim Dockrat. For services to the community in West Yorkshire.
- Eiron Hugh Dodd. For voluntary service to Clubs for Young People in Wales.
- Barry James Donovan. For voluntary service to the community in Colchester, Essex.
- Maria Donovan. For voluntary service to the community in Greengairs, Lanarkshire.
- Neil Andrew Dossor, Administrative Officer, Customer Contact Team, H.M. Revenue and Customs. For public and voluntary service.
- Councillor Mary Elaine Draycott. For services to Local Government and to the community in Leicester.
- John Drayton. For services to the Quarry Industry and to Geology.
- Sophia Drew. For voluntary service to the community in Prestatyn, Denbighshire.
- Anne Patricia Dunham, Equestrian. For services to Disabled Sport.
- Robert William Dunn, National Advocacy Officer, National Kidney Federation. For services to Healthcare.
- Dr. Rosalie Dunn, General Medical Practitioner. For services to the community in Blantyre, Lanarkshire.
- Phyllis Mary Durow, Higher Executive Officer, Jobcentre Plus, Department for Work and Pensions. For public and voluntary service.
- Anthony Durrant, J.P. For services to the Voluntary Sector in the North West.
- Dr. Peter Durrant, County Archivist, Berkshire Record Office. For services to Local Government.
- Doreen Eastwood, Higher Executive Officer, Jobcentre Plus, Department for Work and Pensions.
- Dee Edwards, co-founder, Mothers Against Murder and Aggression. For services to Vulnerable People.
- Hugh Mervyn Edwards. For services to Farming in Cumbria.
- Terry Edwards, Team GB Head Boxing Coach. For services to Sport.
- John Patrick Egan. For voluntary service to the community in Woodhouse, Leeds.
- Doreen Egarr. For voluntary service to the community in St. Albans, Hertfordshire.
- The Reverend Dr. John Elliston. For voluntary service to Vulnerable and Homeless People in Darlington, County Durham.
- Gerald Samuel Ells. For services to Veterans' Tennis.
- Mark Douglas Elson, Grade C1, Ministry of Defence.
- Nigel John Embry, Chief Executive, Farm Stay UK. For services to the Tourist Industry.
- Arthur Aubrey Emerson. For voluntary service to Carers' Group, Rethink Sheffield.
- Vivien Christine Esslemont. Assistant Director, British Council, Mozambique.
- Ronald John Eunson, lately Chair of Governors, Gosforth Central Middle School and Broadway East First School, Newcastle upon Tyne. For voluntary service to Education.
- Susan Christabel Eunson, lately Governor, Gosforth East Middle School and Gosforth Park First School, Newcastle upon Tyne. For voluntary service to Education.
- Professor Rhiannon Evans, National Director, Action on Access and lately Pro-Vice-Chancellor, Edge Hill University. For services to Higher Education.
- Samuel Rowland Evans. For voluntary service to Vintage Agricultural Machinery.
- William Bennett Evans, lately Councillor, Bridgend County Council. For services to Local Government.
- Gillian Mary Eweis, Assistant Anglican Chaplain, H.M. Prison Full Sutton, York. For services to Prisoners.
- Major Stephen Farley, Team GB Quartermaster. For services to Sport.
- Godfrey Eugene Featherstone, lately Director, Kenward Trust. For services to Disadvantaged People.
- Denice Fennell. For services to Nature Conservation.
- Max Field. For services to the community in the West Midlands.
- Frederick James John Fielder. For voluntary service to the community in Greater Manchester.
- Alison Claire Finch, Ward Sister and Senior Nurse, University College London Hospitals NHS Foundation Trust. For services to Healthcare. * Margaret Fish, lately Teacher, Park Primary School, Alloa, Clackmannanshire. For services to Education and to the community in Alloa.
- Rodney Cyril Alban FitzGerald. For services to Local Government in the City of London.
- Robert Fletcher, Bus Driver. For services to Public Transport in Liverpool.
- Patricia Flynn, lately Head of Libraries and Information Services. For services to Local Government in Leicester.
- Raymond Victor Fooks. For voluntary service to the community in Rye, East Sussex.
- Andrew Forbes, Health, Safety and Security Manager, Babcock Marine. For services to Industry.
- Roger Clem Ford. For services to Young People in the West Midlands.
- Susan Piggott-Forster, lately Senior Executive Officer, Learning and Development Unit, UK Border Agency, Home Office.
- Sandra Forsythe, chair, Board of Glasgow Housing Association. For services to Social Housing in Glasgow.
- Rebecca Dawn Fortunato. President, Gibraltar Amateur Swimming Association, and vice-president, Gibraltar Commonwealth Games Association. For services to sport.
- Derek Samuel Foster, Director, Action Training (Stoke) Ltd. For services to Lifelong Learning in StaVordshire.
- Jennifer Ann Fox. For services to the Administration of Science in Norwich.
- Michael Henry Francis. For services to the Tourist Industry in Bournemouth.
- Jenny, Mrs. Frank. For services to Young Carers in Hampshire.
- Paul William Franklin. 2nd Secretary, Foreign and Commonwealth Office.
- Michal Miriam Westmill Furr, Manager, WesthillCCommunity Centre and Community Association. For services to the community in Hitchin, Hertfordshire.
- Margaret Fyffe. For voluntary service to the community in the Isle of Eigg, Highland.
- Colin James Galloway, lately Business Architecture and Customer Strand Lead, Pension Disability and Carers' Service, Department for Work and Pensions.
- David Hugh Geldard. For voluntary service to People with Coronary Heart Disease.
- Alexander Gill. For services to the fishing community in Kingston-upon-Hull.
- Karen Gill, Director, Everywoman Ltd. For services to Women's Enterprise.
- Dr. John Fitzroy Gillespie, J.P., D.L. For voluntary service to Horse Racing in Northern Ireland.
- Gweneth Gimson. For voluntary service in Ulverscroft, Leicestershire.
- Peggy Gledhill. For voluntary service to the community in Horsham, West Sussex.
- Thomas Guy Goldberg, chairman, AWI Ltd. For services to International Trade.
- Paul Goodison, Sailor. For services to Sport.
- Dennis Edward Goodwin. For voluntary services to the First World War Veterans' Association.
- Maureen Gordon. For services to Social Work and to the Voluntary Sector in Northern Ireland.
- Kay Gould, lately Manager, Adderley Children's Centre, Saltley, Birmingham. For services to Children and Families.
- Susan Patricia Gower. For voluntary service to Disabled Children and Young People in Bexley, Kent.
- Shirley Gowland, T.D. For services to disabled people in Billericay, Essex.
- John Grady. For voluntary service to Disabled People in Jersey.
- John Graham, lately Teacher, Hurworth Primary School, Darlington. For services to Education.
- John William Redhead Graham. For voluntary service to the community in Greenside, Tyne and Wear.
- Malise Charles Richard Graham. For voluntary service to the community in Melton Mowbray, Leicestershire.
- Dorrett Buckley-Greaves. For services to Black and Minority Ethnic communities in Sheffield.
- Professor Clara Greed, Professor of Inclusive Urban Planning, University of West England. For services to Urban Design.
- Evelyn Winifred Green. For voluntary service to the community in South London.
- Harold James Green, Chief Road Safety Officer, Road Safety Division, Department of the Environment, Northern Ireland Executive. For public and voluntary service.
- Nigel Francis Green, Chief Officer, Bedfordshire Special Constabulary. For voluntary service to the Police.
- Russell Andrew Greenwood, Administrative Officer, Food and Farming Group, Department for Environment, Food and Rural Affairs. For public and voluntary service.
- Barry David Gregory. For voluntary service to Woodhead Mountain Rescue Team, Holmfirth, West Yorkshire.
- Captain Peter Royall Griffiths, Operations Manager, Royal National Lifeboat Institution. For services to Maritime Safety in Swansea.
- Winsome Elaine Griffiths. For services to the Metropolitan Police Service and to the community in South London.
- Dr. William Henry Grindle. For services to Music in Northern Ireland.
- Patricia Grindle, Principal, Mitchell House Special School. For services to Special Needs Education in Northern Ireland.
- Robert Denis Guiler. For voluntary service to People with Learning Difficulties in Northern Ireland.
- Chris Guille. For voluntary service to Disabled People in Essex.
- Joyce Guy. For services to Older People in the African Caribbean community in the London Borough of Redbridge.
- Lynn Gwilliam, lately Support Grade Band 1, Security and Anti-Corruption Unit, UK Border Agency, Home OYce.
- Peter Haigh, J.P. For voluntary service to the Scouts and to Sailing in West Yorkshire.
- Deborah Anne Hall, Manager, Chigwell Riding Trust for Special Needs. For services to disabled people in Essex.
- John Charles Hall. For voluntary service to the Scouts in SheYeld.
- Beverley Hallam, Grade E1, Ministry of Defence.
- Dave Haller, Swimming Coach. For services to Sport.
- Gerald Halpin. For voluntary service to Art and to Charity in Chorley, Lancashire.
- Lewis Hamilton, Formula One Driver. For services to Motor Racing.
- Stanley Charles Raymond Hammond. For services to Young People and to the community in Bristol.
- John Hansford, lately Director, Swindon Office, Natural Environment Research Council. For services to Science.
- June Mary Harbott. For voluntary service to the community in Stroud, Gloucestershire.
- Michael Hardman. For services to the Campaign for Real Ale and to the Brewing Industry.
- Iain Peter McPherson Hardy. Honorary Consul, Valparaiso.
- Gabrielle Christine Harris. For services to Dance in Rhyl, Denbighshire.
- John Harris, Shipwright, BAE Systems Submarine Solutions. For services to the Defence Industry.
- Barry Albert Haseltine. For services to the Construction Industry.
- Colin Michael Hatch, Senior Divisional Officer, Cornwall County Fire Brigade. For services to Local Government.
- Janet Anne Haynes. For voluntary service to the Leukaemia Research Fund in Rugby.
- Steven Thomas Hayward, Business Development Manager, York Navy Systems. For services to the Defence Industry.
- Joan Healey. For voluntary service to the Citizens' Advice Bureau in Ross and Cromarty.
- Andrew Heath. For services to the Music Publishing Industry.
- Joseph Heatley. For services to Children and Young People within the Immigration System.
- Raymond Francis Hemmett, lately Senior Conservator, Paintings, Historic Scotland Conservation Centre, Scottish Executive.
- Gwynneth Percival Hemmings. For voluntary service to people with schizophrenia.
- David Christopher Henderson. For services to Animal Welfare.
- Rex Andrew Hendricksen. For voluntary service to the Scouts in Cardiff.
- Kenneth Henning. For public service.
- Arek Hersh. For voluntary service to Holocaust Education.
- Claire Elizabeth Hicks, Chief Executive, IMPACT Foundation. For services to International Development.
- Gill Hicks. For charitable services.
- Peter Higgins. For voluntary service to Young People in South Gloucestershire.
- Peter Hindle. Chief Executive, Saint Gobain Distribution UK. For services to the Building Industry and to Charity.
- Anya Hindmarch. For services to the Fashion Industry.
- Donna Johnston Hindmarch, lately Depute Headteacher, Coupar Angus Primary School. For services to Education.
- Linda Hines, Director, Witton Lodge Community Association. For services to the community in North Birmingham.
- Andrew Triggs-Hodge, Rower. For services to Sport.
- Peter Norman Holden, lately Head of People Engagement Department, Royal Society for the Protection of Birds. For services to Nature Conservation.
- Harold William Holland, chairman, North Shore Area Forum. For voluntary service to the community in Blackpool.
- Carole Jean Holmes. For voluntary service to Visually Impaired People in the North West.
- John Edward Holmes. For voluntary service to People with Mental Health Problems in South West London.
- Lee Stephen Holmes, lately Constable, West Yorkshire Police. For services to the Police.
- John Holt. For voluntary service to the community in Featherstone, West Yorkshire.
- Marguerite Loudon Hopkin, for services to the British community in France.
- Kelly Hoppen. For services to Interior Design.
- David Irwin Houghton. For services to Business and to International Trade in the West Midlands.
- Frederick George Ernest Houlton, lately Fostering and Adoption Marketing and Recruitment Officer, Lincolnshire County Council. For services to Children and Families.
- John Houston, Senior Officer, H.M. Revenue and Customs.
- Norman Howarth. For voluntary service to the community in Wythall, Worcestershire.
- Carol Jane Hoy, lately Nurse Specialist. For services to Healthcare.
- Stephen Lawrence Chard Hucklesby. For services during the July 2005 London Bombings.
- Derek Hudspeth, Departmental Superintendent, Department of Geography, University of Durham. For services to Higher Education.
- Laurence Roy Hulbert, Vice-chairman, Governing Body, Shire Oak School, Sutton Coldfield. For voluntary service to Education.
- Mark Hunter, Rower. For services to Sport.
- Robert Daniel Hutton, J.P. For service to St. John Ambulance in Surrey.
- Simon Illingworth. For charitable services.
- Zafar Iqbal, Chairman of Governors, Bordesley Green Girls' School, Birmingham. For voluntary service to Education.
- Eileen Joyce Jackson. For services to the Chertsey Over 60s Club in Surrey.
- Margery Rose James. For voluntary service to the Macmillan Cancer Support in Oswestry, Shropshire.
- Simon Charles James, Chief Engineer, SELEX Communications. For services to the Defence Industry.
- Thomas James, Rower. For services to Sport.
- Councillor Thomas Raymond James. For services to Local Government in Wiltshire.
- Robert Stephen Jefferys. For voluntary service to the community in Berkshire.
- Christopher Dennis Alexander Martin-Jenkins, Cricket Commentator and Journalist. For services to Sport.
- Alderman Kenneth Jenkins. For voluntary service to the community in St. Albans and Harpenden, Hertfordshire.
- Gordon Cyril Jenney. For voluntary service to the community in the East Riding of Yorkshire.
- Peter James Jennings, lately chairman, Avenues Project, Tyne and Wear. For services to Young People.
- Linda Mary Johnson. For services to Palliative Care in North East Wales.
- Tracy Yana Johnson. For services to the Cosmetics Industry.
- Andrea Johnstone. For voluntary service to the community in Berrow, Somerset.
- Dr. Surinder Singh Jolly, General Medical Practitioner, Manchester. For services to Healthcare.
- Bridget Jones. For services to Canterbury Gypsy and Traveller Support Group.
- Constance Zena Jones. For voluntary service to the community in Rilla Mill, Cornwall.
- David Onllwyn Jones, Assistant Headteacher, Villiers High School, Ealing, London. For services to Education.
- John Stanley Jones. For services to Lithography.
- Joy Cummings-Jones, lately Head of Patient and Public Involvement, Nottingham City Primary Care Trust. For services to the NHS.
- Kevin Clifford Jones. For charitable services to the community in Holyhead, Anglesey.
- Libby Jones, Manager, New Pathways, Merthyr Tydfil. For services to Vulnerable People in Wales.
- Neil Rodney Wynn-Jones. For services to International Trade.
- Philip Thomas Morris-Jones. For voluntary service to the community in Telford, Shropshire.
- Robert Norman Jones, lately Head of Design and Interpretative Services, Forestry Commission Scotland.
- Elizabeth Florence Joshua. For Services to Education and the community, St. Helena and Ascension Island.
- Robert William Jost, Prison Officer Physical Education, H.M. Young Offenders' Institution Thorn Cross, Warrington, Ministry of Justice. For public and voluntary service.
- Captain Samson Sassoon Samuel Judah, managing director, GBA Group of Companies. For services to Business and to the community in the East Riding of Yorkshire.
- Roger Jukes. For services to Farming and to the Environment in Powys.
- Lieutenant Colonel John Denis Kane. For voluntary service to the Army Benevolent Fund.
- Anthony Edward Kappes, Cyclist. For services to Disabled Sport.
- Geoffrey Friend Karran. For services to Sport and to Disabled People in the Isle of Man.
- Douglas Robert Keitley, Industrial Grade, H.M. Prison Hewell Grange, Redditch, Worcestershire, Ministry of Justice.
- Renna Kellaway, Pianist and artistic director, Lake District Summer Music. For services to Music.
- Alan Kells, Grade E1, Ministry of Defence. For public and voluntary service.
- Maria Zofina Kempinska, Founder and Creative Director, Jongleurs. For services to the Hospitality and Entertainment Industries.
- Jason Kenny, Cyclist. For services to Sport.
- Elizabeth Kenworthy. For services during the July 2005 London Bombings.
- David Arnold Kerfoot, managing director, Kerfoot Group. For services to Business and to the community in Northallerton, North Yorkshire.
- Nicky Kinnaird, Founder, SpaceNK. For services to the Beauty Industry.
- John Herbert Kirkpatrick. For voluntary service to the RAF Association.
- Terence Kivlin. For services to Skills and to the community in King's Lynn, Norfolk.
- Diana Mary Kloss. For services to Occupational Health.
- Maria Kolpa, Executive Officer, Jobcentre Plus, Department for Work and Pensions. For public and voluntary service.
- John Lakeman. For voluntary service to the communities in the Malvern Hills District, Worcestershire.
- Canon Claire Anne Laland. For services to the Mothers' Union and to the community in Balsall Common, West Midlands.
- Susan Lambert, Court Clerk, Her Majesty's Courts Service, Ministry of Justice. For public and voluntary service.
- Susan Lane, Assistant Principal, Student Services, Knowsley Community College. For services to Further Education in Liverpool.
- Christopher John Wallis Lavers, J.P., D.L. For voluntary service to the community in Surrey.
- Marilyn Sheila Lazarus. For voluntary service to the Jewish Association for the Mentally Ill.
- Terence Michael Lazenby, chairman, Engineering Construction Industry Training Board. For services to Skills and Training.
- David Leach, lately Business Change Manager, Pension, Disability and Carers' Service, Department for Work and Pensions. For public and voluntary service.
- Shirley Adams-Leach. For services to Musical Education, Falkland Islands.
- Carol, Mrs. Leonard, Nursery Nurse, St. Clement Danes Church of England Primary School, Westminster, London. For services to Education.
- Davida Ann Lewis. For voluntary service to Music and to Culture in Wales.
- Geoffrey Ling, Executive Officer, Pension, Disability and Carers' Service, Department for Work and Pensions. For public and voluntary service.
- John Kelvin Lulham. Head of Contracts and Procurement, Transport for London. For services to Equality and Diversity.
- Bimla Devi Lyall, Executive Officer, South East Area Enforcement Office, Sidcup, Driver and Vehicle Licensing Agency, Department for Transport. For public and voluntary service.
- Michael Gabriel Lynch, chair, Larne Citizens' Advice Bureau. For services to the community in Northern Ireland.
- Cheryl MacIntosh. For voluntary service to the community in Lochaber, Inverness-shire.
- Linda Maclean, Communication and Information Business Support Officer, Tribunals Service, Leicester, Ministry of Justice. For public and voluntary service.
- Douglas Richard MacNeilage, lately Janitor, Tobermory High School. For services to Education and to the community in the Isle of Mull.
- Lieutenant Commander Brian Leslie Maddock, R.N.(Retd.), Chief Umpire, Wimbledon Championships. For services to Tennis.
- Ranjula Madhani, Parliamentary Officer, H.M. Treasury. For public and voluntary service.
- Rosemary Maguire. For services to People with Parkinson's Disease in Cornwall.
- Ann Maidment, Teacher, Kenmore Park Middle School, Harrow, London. For services to Education.
- Robina Elizabeth Mallett, Family Carer Support Officer, Home Farm Trust, Bristol. For services to Children and Families.
- Paul Christian Manning, Cyclist. For services to Sport.
- Raymond Arthur Manning. For voluntary service to the community in Benllech, Anglesey.
- Kevin Anthony Marley, Senior Executive Officer, Shared Services, Department for Work and Pensions. For public and voluntary service.
- Maurice Marshal, Chief Electrician, Northcott Theatre, Exeter. For services to Drama.
- Jean Marshall. For services to Young People with Special Needs in Brighton.
- Jonathan Marshall, Founder, Plymouth Centre for Faiths and Cultural Diversity. For services to the community in Plymouth.
- Pamela Marshall, Clinical Director, Eating Disorder Service, Leicestershire. For services to Healthcare.
- Ruby Marshall, chair, Hartlepool Carers. For services to Children and Families.
- Nigel Platts-Martin, Restaurateur. For services to the Hospitality Industry.
- Dr. John William Mason. For services to the South Downs Planetarium and Science Centre, Chichester.
- Israel Massey, co-founder, Race Equality in Newham. For services to Black and Minority Ethnic communities in the London Borough of Newham.
- David James Matthews. For services during the July 2005 London Bombings.
- Alison May McAusland. For voluntary service to the community in Warrington, Cheshire.
- Seamus Aidan McCann, Staff Officer, Mental Health Unit, Social Policy Group, Department of Health, Social Services and Public Safety, Northern Ireland Executive.
- Derek McCarrick. For charitable services.
- Leonie McCarthy, Manager, New Link Centre, Peterborough City Council. For services to Local Government.
- Horace Michael McEvoy. For services to the community in North Wales.
- Owen Reid McGhee. For services to Sport and to Charity.
- Margaret Mary McGoran. For voluntary service to the Catholic Guide Movement in Northern Ireland.
- Gerard McIlmurray. For services during the July 2005 London Bombings.
- Malachy Peter McKernan, Deputy Principal, Energy Division, Department of Enterprise Trade and Investment, Northern Ireland Executive. For public and voluntary service.
- Elizabeth Montgomery McLardy. For services to Local Government and to the community in West Kilbride.
- Stuart David McNeill. For voluntary service to Young People in the UK and Ghana.
- Geoffrey Meehan. For public service.
- Rosemary Andrea Meeke, Grade E1, Ministry of Defence.
- Narendra Mehta. For services to Visually Impaired Asian People.
- Doreen Meiklem, Practice Nurse, Stoneyburn Health Centre. For services to Healthcare and to the community in West Lothian.
- Dr. Alan William Thomas Melville, General Medical Practitioner. For services to Healthcare in Fife.
- William Metcalf. For voluntary service to Homeless People in London.
- John Bissett Methven. For voluntary service to the Boys' Brigade in Kirkcaldy, Fife.
- Charlotte Michaels. For voluntary service to the community in North London.
- Margaret Elizabeth Middlebrook. For voluntary service to the community in Scarborough, North Yorkshire.
- Alice Patricia Middleton, Founder, Survivors of Bereavement by Suicide. For services to Vulnerable People.
- David Edward James Miles, Banjo Player. For services to Music.
- Yvonne Millar, Head, Community Child Psychology Service, Islington Primary Care Trust. For services to Children and Families.
- Paul Stuart Millard. HM Ambassador's driver, for services to the British Embassy in Berne.
- Nicholas Michael Miller. 2nd Secretary, British Embassy, Bogota.
- Samuel Hamilton Miller, for services to Motorcycle Heritage.
- Ross Gibson Milligan, Superintendent Medical Illustrator, Monklands Hospital, Airdrie. For services to Healthcare in Scotland.
- Valerie Mitchell. For services to Nursing in Fife.
- Alexander Moggach. For services to the Industry Engineers' Club Project.
- George Ramsey Martin Moore. For voluntary service to Heritage in the Isle of Man.
- Maureen Tyler-Moore, Principal, Independent Specialist College, Foxes Academy, Minehead. For services to Special Needs Education.
- Ann Morgan, Branch Manager, Bessbrook Library. For services to Local Government in Northern Ireland.
- Dr. Terence John Morris, lately Consultant General Physician and medical director, North Glamorgan NHS Trust. For services to the NHS and to the British Medical Association.
- Samantha Jane Morshed. Founder, Hathay Bunano Knitwear Company. For services to Disadvantaged and Vulnerable Women and Children in Bangladesh.
- Lincoln Moses. For services to Community Football in Birmingham.
- Brian Mummery, Honorary Curator, Immingham Museum. For voluntary service to Heritage in Lincolnshire.
- Douglas William Frederick Muncey. For services to WaterAid.
- Ann Munro. Vice Consul, British Embassy, Doha.
- Margaret Elizabeth, Mrs. Murphy. For charitable services to Bridgend and District Macmillan Cancer Support Group, South Wales.
- Alexandra Murray, Designer. For services to the Fashion and Textile Industries in Scotland.
- Rosemary Murray. For services to Vulnerable People and to Emergency Planning.
- Alexandra Olivia Naish. For services to Community Relations in Bristol.
- Frederick Walter Netley. For voluntary service to the Whitehawk community in Brighton.
- Michael Newsome. For voluntary service to the community in York, North Yorkshire.
- James Percy Newton, Bus Driver, Damory Coaches. For services to Public Transport in Dorset.
- Dorothy Margaret Neyland. For voluntary service to Gymnastics and to the community in Swansea.
- Primrose Cherry Nixon, Complaints Liaison OYcer, PAYE and Self Assessment, Belfast, H.M. Revenue and Customs.
- Valerie Frances Norman. For voluntary service to the Samaritans in Bangor, North Wales.
- Michael Robin Norton. For services to the Water Industry and to International Trade.
- Dr. Heather Nunnerley. For services to Healthcare in South East London.
- Margaret O'Callaghan, chair, Outer West Area Forum. For services to the community in Newcastle- upon-Tyne.
- Thomas O'Callaghan. For services to Lifelong Learning in the Transport Industry.
- Avril O'Sullivan. For voluntary service to People with Learning Disabilities in Essex.
- David Oddie, Senior Lecturer in Drama, University College Plymouth of St. Mark and St.John. For services to International Relations.
- Christine Ijeoma Ohuruogu, Athlete. For services to Sport.
- Noreen Oliver, Chief Executive, Burton Addiction Centre, for services to disadvantaged people in Staffordshire.
- Comfort Oppong, Home Manager, Anchor Homes. For services to Older People in Southwark, London.
- Derek Stanley Osbaldestin. For voluntary service to Young People and to the community in Greater Manchester.
- David Jeremy Owen Owen. For charitable services.
- Annabel Serena Oxley. For voluntary service to Injured Jockeys.
- Dr. Shiv Pabary, General Practice Dentist, Newcastle and Gateshead. For services to the NHS.
- Russell Edward Parke. For services to the Scouts in Hampshire.
- Robert John Parsons, Herald Painter, College of Arms. For services to Art.
- Charles Nicholas Partridge, T.D. For public service.
- Major John William Joseph Paton. For voluntary service to Heritage in Scotland and Overseas.
- Gillian Patricolo, Non-Domestic Rating Reference Manager, Valuation Office Agency, Cardiff, H.M. Revenue and Customs.
- Maureen May Payan. For voluntary service to the community in Twickenham, Middlesex.
- Sara Payne, Co-Advocate, Phoenix Trust. For services to Child Protection.
- Alexandra Maria Pearson. For services to victims of the Chinese earthquake in May 2008
- Brian Pearson, lately Change Manager, Jobcentre Plus, Department for Work and Pensions. For public and voluntary service.
- David Alan Pease. For services to Literature.
- Richard Norman Pendlebury. For charitable services to the community in Bristol.
- Victoria Pendleton, Cyclist. For services to Sport
- Linda Margaret Pepper, lately chief executive officer, Powys Association of Voluntary Organisations. For services to the Voluntary Sector in Wales.
- Major Arthur Eric Robin Peters. For services to the Royal British Legion in Somerset.
- Henry Desmond Kelly Phillips. For voluntary service to the community in Northern Ireland.
- Pauline Pilkington, Executive OYcer, Jobcentre Plus, Department for Work and Pensions. For public and voluntary service.
- Andrew Richard Platt, Prison OYcer, H.M. Prison Manchester, Ministry of Justice. For public and voluntary service.
- Colin Ploughman. For voluntary service to the community in Golspie, Sutherland.
- Janette Vicki Plumridge. Secretariat Administrator, Enemy Property Claims Assessment Panel, Department for Business, Enterprise and Regulatory Reform.
- Dr. Margaret Ebunoluwa Aderin-Pocock, managing director, Science Innovation Ltd. For services to Science Education.
- Brian Andrew Gillingham Poole, Chief Steward. For services to the Armed Forces.
- Rosie Swale Pope. For charitable services. William Roy Potter. For voluntary service to Cycling in Lancashire.
- Michael John David Poulter, chairman, Staffordshire Police Authority. For services to the community in Staffordshire.
- Colin Francis Powell. For services to the Oswestry Talking Newspaper in Shropshire.
- Lianne Walker Powell, Group General Manager, Walker Filtration Ltd. For services to Manufacturing in Tyne and Wear and to International Trade.
- Jane Pratt, Governor, The Connaught School, Aldershot, Hampshire. For voluntary service to Education.
- Veronica Kay Prichard. For services to Angling and to the Environment in West Wales.
- Valerie Priestley. For services to Edith Cavell Lower School, Bedford.
- Robin Kingsley Prince, Operations Standards Manager, Victa Railfreight. For service to the Rail Industry.
- Trixie Pulsford, Head Coach, Ross-on-Wye Swimming Club. For voluntary service to Sport in Herefordshire.
- Zachary Purchase, Rower. For services to Sport.
- Christopher Billy Pye, British Swimming Head Disability Coach. For services to Sport.
- Bernard Godfrey Rainbow, Chief Locomotive Inspector, Severn Valley Railway. For voluntary service to the Rail Industry.
- Yvonne, Mrs. Rawley. For services to the Water Industry and to Charity.
- Lieutenant Peter Reed, Rower. For services to Sport.
- Allan Rees. For services to the National Society of Allotment and Leisure Gardeners and to the Royal British Legion in South Wales.
- Derek Reginald Reeves. For charitable services through the Alhaji Sir Abubakar Tafawa Balewa Memorial Trust and to the community in Farnham, Surrey.
- Christine Reid, Lawyer, Lambert Group. For services to Collaborative Research and Innovation.
- Caroline Rejdak, Foster Carer, Hertfordshire. For services to Children and Families.
- Robert Rejdak, Foster Carer, Hertfordshire. For services to Children and Families.
- Yvonne Rhoden, Constable, Metropolitan Police Service. For services to the Police.
- Etheline Mavis Richards. For voluntary service to Healthcare and to the community in North London.
- Simon Richardson, Cyclist. For services to Disabled Sport.
- Trevor Maxwell Ringland. For services to the community in Northern Ireland.
- Kenelm Robert, Head of Customer Relations, Royal Festival Hall. For services to the Arts.
- Captain John Alan Roberts. Chief Executive, White Ensign Association. For services to Royal Navy Personnel.
- Marcia Roberts. For services to Diversity and to the Recruitment Industry.
- Enid Barbara Rodd. For voluntary service to the community in Pentyrch, Cardiff.
- Marjory Rodger. Director of Government Relations (Scotland), Confederation of Passenger Transport UK. For services to the Bus Industry.
- Rebecca Romero, Cyclist. For services to Sport.
- Frederick Clifford Rose. For charitable services to the Anglican Church in Wales and to Music in Swansea.
- Phyllis Freda Rose. For voluntary service to MIND East Berkshire.
- Elaine Rossall. For voluntary service to Home-Start Newark, Nottinghamshire.
- Martin Rourke, Pay and Conditions and Adelphi Human Resources Manager, Home Office.
- Colin Rouse. For voluntary service to the British Limbless Ex-Service Men's Association.
- Veronica Rowland, Cook Manager, St Joseph's Boys' High School, Newry. For services to Education in Northern Ireland.
- Jill Russell. For voluntary service to the community in Kilmacolm, Inverclyde.
- Monica Joan Russell. For voluntary service at H.M. Prison Lewes.
- David Ryan. For services to the Royal Mail and to the community in North London.
- Councillor Rex Sadler, Member, Kerrier District Council. For services to Local Government in Cornwall.
- Kate Schroder, Chief Executive, 4sight. For services to Visually Impaired People in West Sussex.
- Jonathan Leslie Bernard Scriver, Officer, Heathrow Airport, H.M. Revenue and Customs. For public and voluntary service.
- Kathryn Mary, Mrs. Scully, Youth Worker, Bath and North East Somerset. For services to Young People.
- Ian Seabourne. Founder, Operation Breakthrough, for services to tackling juvenile delinquency through sport in Hong Kong.
- Ms Jennifer Sealey, artistic director, Graeae Theatre Company. For services to Disability Arts.
- Dr. Nigel Seddon, Novel Systems Technical Expert, MBDA UK Ltd. For services to the Defence Industry.
- Hilary Margaret Sewill, Vice-chair, Gatwick Airport Consultative Committee. For public service.
- Josephine Shanks. For voluntary service to Adult Literacy and to Numeracy in South Lanarkshire.
- Gary Shaw. For services to the Police.
- Michael Shefras. For voluntary service to Boaters in the Thames Valley.
- Martin Henry Sheppard, Grade C1, Ministry of Defence.
- Thomas Harley Sherlock. For services to Architecture, Conservation and to the community in Islington, London.
- Jennifer Anna Shirreffs, D.L. For voluntary service to the community in Aberdeen.
- Elisabeth Alexandra Shorthose. For voluntary service to the community in Newhaven and Leith, Edinburgh.
- Antonio Mario Silvestro. For services during the July 2005 London Bombings.
- Eleanor Simmonds, Swimmer. For services to Disabled Sport.
- Andrew James Simpson, Sailor. For services to Sport.
- Norma Mary Sinclair. For voluntary service to the community in Reading, Berkshire.
- Linda Geraldine Glennys Singleton, Head of Strategic Resourcing, People and Professional Capability Group Finance Directorate, Department for Work and Pensions. For public and voluntary service.
- RuthcSkinner. For services to Riding for the Disabled and to the community in Inverurie, Aberdeenshire.
- Layla Kelly Slatter, former 3rd Secretary, British Embassy, Damascus. For services in the Middle East and Afghanistan.
- Alfred John Slow. For voluntary service to the community in Wimborne, Dorset.
- Guy Wilson Smales, D.L. For voluntary service to Neighbourhood Watch in West Hampshire.
- Betty Smith (Liz Smith), Actor. For services to Drama.
- Catherine Smith. For voluntary service to the H.M. Prison Service Charity Fund.
- David George Gordon-Smith, chief executive officer, Orchard Trust. For services to People with Learning Difficulties, Forest of Dean, Gloucestershire.
- Doreen Smith. For voluntary service to the community in Broadwater, Lancashire.
- Jane Smith. For voluntary service to the Independent Monitoring Board, H.M. Prison and Young Offenders' Institution Eastwood Park, Gloucestershire.
- Raymond John Smith, lately Senior Carpenter, St. Fagans National History Museum, Cardiff. For services to Welsh Heritage.
- Vanessa Frances Hall-Smith. Director, British Institute of Florence, for services to promoting UK culture in Italy.
- Vivienne Evelyn Smith. For voluntary service to Girlguiding in the Anglia Region.
- Graham Arthur Smout, Special Constable, Staffordshire Police. For voluntary service to the Police.
- Michael Douglas Snowling. For services to Children and Young People in Norfolk.
- Colin Sparkes, Team Leader, Cross Tax Evasion Intervention, H.M. Revenue and Customs.
- Wayne Spence, Service Delivery Assistant, Temple Meads Station, Bristol. For services to Passenger Transport.
- Siobhan Spencer, Member, Derbyshire Gypsy Liaison Group. For services to Community Relations.
- Jamie Staff, Cyclist. For services to Sport.
- Angela Star. For services to Healthcare for Young People in Tyne and Wear.
- Eilish Steele. For services to People with Learning Disabilities in Northern Ireland.
- Paul Stennett, Chief Executive, United Kingdom Accreditation Service. For services to Business.
- Paul Darby Stevenage, Grade C1, Ministry of Defence. John James Surgeoner Stewart. For voluntary service to the community in Droylsden, Greater Manchester.
- Dr. Marie Stewart. For services to Education, Diversity and to Equal Opportunities.
- Patricia Elizabeth Stewart, Community Payback Supervisor, Kent Probation Area. For services to the Probation Service.
- David Stone, Cyclist. For services to Disabled Sport.
- Richard Barnaby Storey, Cycling Pilot. For services to Disabled Sport.
- Donald Stringer, Governor, Northfield School and Sports College, Stockton-on-Tees. For voluntary service to Education.
- David Alan Stroud. For services to Nature Conservation.
- Dr. James Douglas Stuart. For voluntary service to the community in South Queensferry, West Lothian.
- Brian Kenneth Sugden, Grade C1, Ministry of Defence.
- Stephen Alan Sullivan. For charitable services to Cancer Care and Research, Velindre Hospital, Cardiff.
- Alexander Ross Sutherland. For voluntary service to Swimming in Inverness.
- Captain Michael John Sutherland, Harbour Master, Port of Fowey. For services to the Ports Industry in the South West.
- Dr. Doron Swade. For services to the History of Computing.
- Alan Godfrey Swerdlow. For services to the Arts and to the communities in Liverpool and Suffolk.
- Pauline Tagg, lately Director, Infection Control and Prevention, University Hospitals of Leicester NHS Trust. For services to Healthcare.
- Diane Talbot, Dietetic Manager, Leicestershire County and Rutland Primary Care Trust. For services to Public Health.
- William Mitchell Tate, Principal, Belvoir Park Primary School, Belfast. For services to Education in Northern Ireland.
- Tamsila Tauqir. For services to the Muslim Community.
- Anne Caroline Taylor. For services to Young People and to the community in Chichester, West Sussex.
- Councillor The Honourable Joan Evelyn Taylor. For services to Local Government in the East Midlands.
- John Teal, Caretaker, Hartlepool Sixth Form College. For services to Further Education.
- David Roy Thomas. For services to the community in St. Davids, Pembrokeshire.
- Geraint Thomas, Cyclist. For services to Sport.
- Brian Thompson. For services to Young People and to the community in Maryport, Cumbria.
- Wendy Thomson, lately Administrative Assistant Typist, Crown Prosecution Service. For public and voluntary service.
- Tony Thornton, Salvation Army Centre Manager. For services to Homeless People in Darlington, County Durham.
- Karen Margaret Tonge. For voluntary service to Table Tennis.
- Lynda Ann Toon. For services to Adults with Learning Disabilities in Leicestershire.
- Paula Mac Townsend. For voluntary service to the community of East and West Worlington, Devon.
- Sophi Tranchell, managing director, Divine Chocolate. For services to the Food Industry.
- Sarah, Mrs. Tremellen, chief executive officer, Bravissimo. For services to Entrepreneurship.
- Susan Tron. For services to Riding for Disadvantaged People in Tyne and Wear.
- Arthur Chesley Trott. Artist and Sculptor. For services to Art in Bermuda.
- Anthony Tsui Tin-Yau. Director, Croucher Foundation. For services to Science and UK/Hong Kong relations.
- Dennis Henry Arthur Tuffin. For services to the Rendezvous Advice Centre, Sherborne, Dorset.
- Graham David Tyler, Grade C2, Ministry of Defence. For public service.
- Sheila Tyson, chair, Grange-over-Sands and South Cumbria Branch, NSPCC. For voluntary service to Children.
- Eric George Vanlint. For services to Literature and to Charity in Suffolk.
- Bal Virdee, Higher Executive Officer, Jobcentre Plus, Department for Work and Pensions.
- The Reverend Canon Peter Vowles. For voluntary service to Victim Support in Greater Manchester.
- Peter John Vowles, Learning Gateway Manager, Weymouth College. For services to Further Education.
- Josephine Mary Wakeham, Chair of Governors, Mousehole Community Primary School and vice-chair, Cornwall School Governors' Council. For voluntary service to Education.
- John Robert Walker. For services to Nature Conservation in Lincolnshire.
- Matthew Benedict Walker, Swimmer. For services to Disabled Sport.
- Clifford John Wallace. For voluntary service to Older People in Rochford, Essex.
- Daniel Wallis, lately Policy and Strategy Manager, Pension Disability and Carers' Service, Department for Work and Pensions. For public and voluntary service.
- Eric John Wallis. For voluntary service to the South West Coast Path Association.
- Patricia Ellen Wallson, lately Headteacher, Columbia Market Nursery School and vice-chair, Little Oaks Children's Centre, Tower Hamlets, London. For services to Early Years Education.
- Rosemary Anne, Mrs Ward, Learning and Teaching Support Assistant, School of Education, Nottingham Trent University. For services to Higher Education.
- Ernest John Watkins. For voluntary service to Education in Newport, South Wales.
- Garry Watts, lately Non-Executive Director and chairman, Risk and Audit Committee, Medicines and Healthcare Products Regulatory Agency. For services to Healthcare.
- Margaret Evelyn Way. For voluntary service to Speech and Drama in Taunton, Somerset.
- David Weir, Wheelchair Racer. For services to Disabled Sport.
- William Alfred Wells, Messenger, Cabinet Office.
- Carole, Mrs. Wendland, Senior Executive Officer, Low Cost Home Ownership Division, Department for Communities and Local Government.
- John Miles Westcott, Chief Executive, Kingswood Foundation, Bristol. For services to Young People.
- Canon Richard Ian White. For services to Music Education.
- Susan Margaret Whitham, Head of Secretariat, Sixth Form Colleges Forum. For services to Further Education.
- Pamela Mary McCane-Whitney. For voluntary service to Cancer Research UK.
- Alister Stanley Widdowson, former Senior Teacher, British Council, Burma.
- Brian Hamilton Williams. For voluntary service to the Royal National Lifeboat Institution in Cornwall.
- Diana Joy, Mrs. Williams, Assistant Chief Officer, East Sussex Fire and Rescue Service. For services to Local Government.
- Inga Mary Williams. Secretary, Links House Senior Citizens Residence. For services to the British community in Argentina.
- Marjorie June, Mrs. Williams. For services to the Burma Star Association in the South West.
- Dr. Roger Bevan Williams, Master of Chapel and Ceremonial Music, University of Aberdeen. For services to Music.
- Christopher Wilson, J.P., chairman, Redbridge Pensioners' Forum. For services to Older People in Greater London.
- George Wilson. For services to Business in Kent.
- Philippa Claire Wilson, Sailor. For services to Sport.
- Stephanie Dawn Wilson, Governor, Newland School for Girls. For voluntary service to Education and to the community in Kingston-upon-Hull. * Edward Wingrave. For services to Cycling.
- Norris Winstone. For services to Folk Music and to Dance in Norfolk.
- Lisa Nicole Wise. For public service to Global Tax Issues, H.M. Revenue and Customs.
- Ping-ka Andrew Wong. For services to the Chinese community in Northern Ireland.
- Christine Wood, Senior Library and Information Assistant, Benwell Library, Newcastle upon Tyne. For services to Local Government.
- Katherine Ruth Askey-Wood. For voluntary service to Cancer Research UK.
- Raymond Wood. For voluntary service to the community in Morayshire.
- Christopher John Worthington. Honorary Supervisor, Commonwealth War Graves Commission, Sri Lanka. For services to the memory of the war dead.
- Christina Elizabeth Malcolm Wright, lately Head of Performing Arts Faculty, Burnholme Community College, York. For services to Education.
- Jonathan Hedley Wright. For voluntary service to the community in Bradford, West Yorkshire.
- Syd Allen Wright, Chief Technician for Insect Survey, Rothamsted Research. For services to Science.
- Michael William Young, chair, Institute of Northern Ireland Beekeepers. For voluntary service to Apiculture and to Conservation.
- Alice Zeitlyn. For voluntary service to the community in Cambridge.

=== Queen's Volunteer Reserves Medal (QVRM) ===
- Warrant Officer Class 2 Maurice William Byrne
- Colonel Celia Jane Harvey OBE TD
- Warrant Officer Class 2 Joseph Raymond Krikorian
- Sergeant David Paul Sadler

== Crown Dependencies ==
=== The Most Excellent Order of the British Empire ===
==== Member of the Order of the British Empire (MBE) ====
Jersey

- John Grady, for his contribution to disability sport in Jersey

Isle of Man

- Geoffrey Friend Karran, for services to Sport and to Disabled People in the Isle of Man
- George Ramsey Martin Moore, for voluntary serv to Heritage in the Isle of Man

== Cook Islands ==
=== Officer of the Order of the British Empire (OBE) ===
- Mrs Marjorie Tuainekore Tere Crocombe, for services to the Cook Islands, the Pacific, education, literature and the community.

=== Member of the Order of the British Empire (MBE) ===
- Tutai-o-Ngarnetua Toru, for public service and services to sport

=== British Empire Medal (BEM) ===
- Taepae Tuteru, for public service and service to the Church
- Tomoavao Tamanu Wichman, for services to the community and to scientific inventions

== Barbados ==
=== Commander of the Order of the British Empire (CBE) ===
- Marvo Olivia Manning, for service to the arts and to youth development
- The Very Reverend Frank Bert Hamilton Harcourt Marshall, for services to religion and to the community
- Astor Burleigh Watts, for services to the construction industry

=== Officer of the Order of the British Empire (OBE) ===
- Mrs Enid Amelia Gay, for services to nursing and nursing education
- Cyrul Valentine Walker, for services to education and to the Diaspora
- Winston Carloyde Yearwood, for services to entertainment, tourism and youth education.

=== Members of the Order of the British Empire (MBE) ===
- Reverend Lucille Onita Baird, for services to the Church and the community
- Mrs Marlon Loleita Hart, for services to the promotion of local cuisine
- Geoffrey Cartlon Morris, for services to education and childcare

== Grenada ==
=== Commander of the Order of the British Empire (CBE) ===
- George Ignatius Brizan CMG, for services to politics and education

=== Members of the Order of the British Empire (MBE) ===
- Hillary Anne Gabriel, for community work with persons living with disabilities
- Richard N. Hughes, for services to sport
- Michael Pierre, for services to politics and education

=== British Empire Medal (BEM) ===
- Peter Joseph Blair, for services to sport and culture
- John Francis, for services to farming

== Saint Vincent and the Grenadines ==
=== Companion of the Order of St Michael and St George (CMG) ===
- Reverend Arthur Hoskins Huggins, for services to religion and education

=== Officer of the Order of the British Empire (OBE) ===
- Alphius Nathaniel Jack, for services to business, religion and the community
- Dr Timothy Leroy Providence, for services to medicine and to the community

=== Members of the Order of the British Empire (MBE) ===
- Mrs Muriel Dorothy Gunsam, for services to business and to religion
- Anesta Ileen Rodney, for services to education and to the community
- Mrs Cacheta Iselma Matthews-Williams, for services to business and to the community

== Antigua and Barbuda ==
=== Companion of the Order of St Michael and St George (CMG) ===
- Colonel Trevor A. Thomas, for services to the Antigua and Barbuda Defence Force

=== Officer of the Order of the British Empire (OBE) ===
- Lieutenant Colonel Edward H. Croft, Antigua and Barbuda Defence Force

=== Member of the Order of the British Empire (MBE) ===
- Mrs Gledina Mashela Roberts-McKay, for services to public service

== Belize ==
=== Commander of the Order of the British Empire (CBE) ===
- Rodwell Roosevelt Adlai Williams, for services to the public and community service

=== Officer of the Order of the British Empire (OBE) ===
- Mrs Floridalba Carmita Contreras, for services to the education and the community

=== Members of the Order of the British Empire (MBE) ===
- June Amelia Heusner JP, for public and community service
- Celi Nunez McCorkie, for services to the community and commerce

== Saint Christopher and Nevis ==
=== Members of the Order of the British Empire (MBE) ===
- Mrs Mary Sophia Morton, for public service
- Clifford Macleod Fitzroy Thomas, for services to the trade unions
