= Noreen Oliver =

British rehabilitation centre owner (1960–2023)

Noreen Oliver MBE
- Born: Noreen Mary Langan; 23 April 1960
- Died: 16 December 2023 (aged 63)
- Known for: activism; founder of addiction treatment centres

Noreen Oliver MBE (23 April 1960 – 16 December 2023) was a British businesswoman, rehabilitation centre owner and advocate of drug and alcohol policy reform. She was the founder and CEO of addiction treatment centres in Burton-upon-Trent and Clayton, Staffordshire.

== Biography ==
She attended Christ the King Catholic Voluntary Academy, Nottinghamshire. She completed O-Levels in English, history, domestic science and science. She received a postgraduate degree in marketing from the Chartered Institute of Marketing. From 1975 to 1998, she worked in various positions and industries, including as a dental nurse, director of patient services at a private clinic, pharmaceutical representative, healthcare liaison worker in the community, and marketing manager and volunteer at the Nottingham Clinic.

She began drinking at age 16 and suffered from alcoholism for years; her first alcohol detox treatment was at age 25. She recalls, "I was a functioning alcoholic. I held down two jobs. But towards the end there were emergency admissions to hospital. I had consultants screaming that I was going through liver failure." By 1992, at age 31, she was drinking a bottle of gin a day and was hospitalised with cirrhosis. She was malnourished and weighed just 6 stone (84 lb); her stomach was so shrunken that she was unable to eat. At one point she was so ill she was given last rites by a priest; after surviving, she vowed to turn her life around.

She attempted detox nine times in total. After her near-death experience, her family arranged for her to attend a rehabilitation clinic in Nottingham. She recalled, "I shared a room with a female crack addict who also worked the streets. This was a completely alien thing to me and, at first, I was horrified but soon realised she was not so different to me."

She stopped drinking completely in 1993. She sought doctors' advice on how she could help others and ultimately founded her own treatment centre. "I started in two rooms, remortgaged my home, and it began to grow from there."

== Recovery centres and activism ==
In 1998, she founded the Burton Addiction Centre, now the BAC O'Connor Centre, in Burton-on-Trent, Staffordshire, and in 2002 opened a second BAC O'Connor Centre in Clayton. She has stated that BAC has one of the highest rates of success for helping people rehabilitate from drug and alcohol addictions and integrate into society. In 2011, she told the BBC that the centre's figures show 74 per cent of drug users and 83 per cent of alcoholics being sober two years after completing the 18-week programme; the UK national average is 30 per cent sober six years after treatment.

The centre earned the highest scores in the United Kingdom from the Healthcare Commission in 2006 and has become nationally renowned, eliciting praise from Prime Minister David Cameron. The Staffordshire County Council plans to use the BAC O'Connor Centre as a template to open other similar centres across Staffordshire.

Oliver established the O'Connor Gateway Trust, a charitable organisation that helps recovering drug addicts and alcoholics gain the necessary skills and qualifications for employment, and to provide a safe, social environment free from drugs or alcohol for recovering addicts. The trust also runs Recovery Is Out There (RIOT), a community group formed of recovering addicts who have been through the BAC programme. The group works to educate the community and provide support for other recovering addicts.

In 2010, Burton Addiction Centre opened Langan’s Tea Rooms in Burton-on-Trent, a social enterprise that employs recovering addicts. Langan's Tea Rooms, which takes its title from her maiden name, was built in a former restaurant located in a historic building, Burton House.

Oliver is a strong advocate of abstinence-based recovery. In 2010, she founded the Recovery Group UK, an alliance of academics, rehabilitation service providers and drug- and alcohol-related organisations. The Recovery Group UK is an advocacy group working toward what Oliver calls "a balanced, integrated, seamless treatment system focused on recovery." Oliver was a speaker at the 2011 UK and European Symposium on Addictive Disorders (UKESAD) in London.

She is a member of the Community, Voluntary and Local Services Honours Committee, a Cabinet Office committee that reviews nominations for national honours for merit and service. She is also a Director of The Centre for Social Justice, a leading Think Tank in the UK.

== Awards ==
Oliver was made a Member of the Order of the British Empire, for services to disadvantaged people in Staffordshire, as part of the 2009 New Year Honours.

She won the Daily Mirror People's Award for Justice in 2006.

In 2010, she received a lifetime achievement award from the Centre for Social Justice. The recipient of the award is selected annually by the group's co-founder, MP Iain Duncan Smith. She sat on the CSJ's board of directors as chairman of the Addictions Working Group.

In 2011, Noreen became the first Freewoman in the history of the Borough of East Staffordshire.

Prior to the 2012 Olympics in London, Oliver was invited to carry the Olympic flame during the relay in Melton Mowbray, Leicestershire.

In June 2013, she received a Burton Mail Community Champion Public Service Award.

The same year, she became a member of the CVLS Honours Committee and director of the Centre for Social Justice in March 2014, becoming a Fellow for the Centre for Social Justice in November 2014.

TouchFM gave Noreen a Pride of Burton Award in June 2014.

In October 2015, she received an Amy Winehouse Foundation Award for Services to Recovery Communities across the UK.

Oliver became an Honorary Fellow of Burton and South Derbyshire College in October 2019 and a Fellow of Rotary International in March 2020.

In November 2023, Oliver was honoured with the award of Honorary Doctorate of Letters by Staffordshire University in recognition of her work in addiction rehabilitation, saving lives across the country, including in Staffordshire.

== Personal life ==
She has been married to Tony Oliver, a prison officer, since 2005. She has a stepdaughter and two grandchildren.

As a result of her alcoholism, she suffered from diabetes and damaged nerve endings in her legs.

Through her activism she became friends with former drug addict Russell Brand, who sought her advice about what to do with funds he had raised to help addicts. She was interviewed in his 2014 BBC Three documentary, End the Drugs War, in which Brand visited the BAC Centre and attended a graduation ceremony for a recovering addict who had just completed the programme. He also visited the Langan's Tea Rooms; he subsequently opened a similar social enterprise, the Trew Era Cafe. She also appeared in Brand: A Second Coming, a 2015 documentary about Brand's activism.

She died on 16 December 2023.
