= List of office holders of the Duchy of Lancaster =

This is an incomplete list of office holders of the Duchy of Lancaster.

== Offices ==
=== Chancellors of the Duchy of Lancaster ===
- List of chancellors of the Duchy of Lancaster

=== Clerks of the Council of the Duchy of Lancaster ===
- Clerk of the Council of the Duchy of Lancaster

=== King's Counsel of the Duchy of Lancaster ===
- Thomas Ireland
- Orlando Bridgeman
- Edward Rigby

=== Receiver General of the Duchy of Lancaster ===
- Sir Philip Butler
- Sir Richard Molyneux
- Simon Every
- Sir Peter Miles (1981–1987)

=== Serjeant at law in the Duchy ===
- 1604 – Thomas Tyldesley
- 1626 – Christopher Bannister
- 1649 – Thomas Fell

== See also ==
- List of office holders of the Duchy of Cornwall
