= Peter Holden (ornithologist) =

British ornithologist, author and conservation educator

Peter Holden MBE
- Born: 1948
- Occupations: Ornithologist, author, conservation educator
- Known for: Big Garden Birdwatch; Royal Society for the Protection of Birds
- Children: Andy Holden
- Awards: MBE (2009)

Peter Norman Holden MBE (born 1948) is a British ornithologist, author, and conservation educator. Over a 40-year career with the Royal Society for the Protection of Birds (RSPB), he led the Young Ornithologists' Club and devised the Big Garden Birdwatch, one of the world's largest citizen science wildlife surveys. He has authored or co-authored more than a dozen popular field guides and natural history books, including the RSPB Handbook of British Birds, and regularly presented and advised on natural history broadcasts for the BBC and Channel 4.

== RSPB career and the Big Garden Birdwatch ==
Holden joined the RSPB in 1969 as an assistant education officer. In 1975 he became national organiser of the Young Ornithologists' Club (YOC), directing the youth division until 1992, during which time membership expanded to over 160,000 children. He later served as head of the RSPB's Youth and Volunteer Department and subsequently as head of People Engagement before retiring from the society in 2008.

In 1979, Holden conceived and launched the first Big Garden Birdwatch in collaboration with the BBC children's television programme Blue Peter. Originally intended as an annual winter counting activity for junior members, the public response led to its expansion into a nationwide annual survey for all ages, growing to record millions of bird observations annually.

Holden has also served as a tutor in ornithology at the University of Cambridge's Institute of Continuing Education at Madingley Hall.

== Writing and broadcasting ==
Between 1975 and the 1990s, Holden made regular guest appearances as an ornithological specialist on Blue Peter, educating audiences on bird behaviour and identification. In 1994 and 1995, he co-presented two series of the BBC One live natural history programme Bird in the Nest alongside Bill Oddie, following nesting birds using live micro-cameras. He later presented nature and science programmes for Channel 4 and made appearances on the BBC's Springwatch.

Holden has written or co-authored more than a dozen wildlife reference books, notably for Bloomsbury Publishing and Christopher Helm. His works include the RSPB Handbook of British Birds (first published in 2002 and co-authored with Richard Gregory, reaching its fifth revised edition in 2021), RSPB Handbook of Garden Wildlife, and Birds: Their Hidden World.

== Selected publications ==
- Oddie, Bill; Holden, Peter (1995). Bird in the Nest. Robson Books. ISBN 978-0-86051-983-6.
- Holden, Peter (2003). RSPB Birds: Their Hidden World. Christopher Helm. ISBN 978-0-7136-6516-1.
- Holden, Peter; Holden, Katheryn (2008). RSPB Handbook of Garden Wildlife. Bloomsbury. ISBN 978-0-7136-8860-3.
- Holden, Peter; Gregory, Richard (2021). RSPB Handbook of British Birds (5th ed.). Bloomsbury. ISBN 978-1-4729-8025-0.

== Natural Selection exhibition ==
Holden is the father of the contemporary artist Andy Holden. In 2017, the father and son collaborated on Natural Selection, a major multimedia exhibition commissioned by Artangel. Staged at the former Newington Library in London before touring to Towner Art Gallery, Leeds Art Gallery, and Bristol Museum & Art Gallery, the exhibition explored the history of egg collecting, avian nest construction, and evolutionary aesthetics by pairing Peter Holden's scientific commentary with Andy Holden's artistic installations.

In The Observer, art critic Laura Cumming awarded the exhibition five stars, describing it as a "show of marvels" and noting the dialogue between Holden's ornithological field experience and his son's artistic framework. The project also received reviews in Time Out and The Art Newspaper. A related film, A Natural History of Nest Building, in which both Holdens appear, was acquired by the Tate and displayed at Tate St Ives in 2024.

== Honours ==
Holden was appointed a Member of the Order of the British Empire (MBE) in the 2009 New Year Honours for services to nature conservation, recognising his four decades of engagement work with the public and youth conservation.
