= Michael Kershaw Ridley =

Sir Michael Kershaw Ridley, KCVO, FRICS (born 7 December 1937) was Clerk of the Council of the Duchy of Lancaster from 1981 to 2000. A graduate of Magdalene College, Cambridge, he worked for the Grosvenor Estate from 1965 to 1972 and was then Property Manager for British and Commonwealth Shipping until 1981. He was appointed a Knight Commander of the Royal Victorian Order in the 2000 Birthday Honours.
