= Paul Robert Virgo Clarke =

Sir Paul Clarke KCVO

Clerk of the Council of the Duchy of Lancaster
- In office 2000–2013

Personal details
- Born: 13 August 1953 (age 72)

Sir Paul Robert Virgo Clarke, KCVO (born 1953) is a former Clerk of the Council of the Duchy of Lancaster, a position he held from 2000 until 2013.

== Early life and education ==
Born on 13 August 1953 he was educated at Abingdon School in Abingdon-on-Thames from 1964 until 1971. He was a member of the tennis team and gained half-colours, he was also a prefect in School House and played hockey for the school.

== Career ==
He started his career at the Grosvenor Estate in London as Assistant to the Executive Trustee.

He was the Clerk of the Council of the Duchy of Lancaster from 2000 until 2013.

In the 2009 New Year Honours he was appointed a Commander of the Royal Victorian Order (CVO). After leaving the role in 2013 Clarke was appointed a Knight Commander of the Royal Victorian Order (KCVO) in the 2013 Special Honours.

Since leaving the Duchy he has acted as Managing Director for several companies.

== See also ==
- List of Old Abingdonians
