= Duchy of Lancaster =

Private estate of the British sovereign as Duke of Lancaster

- Creation date: 6 March 1351 (675 years ago)
- Created by: Edward III
- First holder: Henry of Grosmont
- Present holder: Charles III
- Heir apparent: William, Prince of Wales

The Duchy of Lancaster is an estate of the British sovereign.

The estate has its origins in the lands held by the medieval Dukes of Lancaster, which came under the direct control of the monarch when Henry Bolingbroke, the then-duke of Lancaster, ascended the throne, as Henry IV, in 1399. In 1461, King Edward IV confirmed that the Duchy would be inherited by the monarch, but held separately from the Crown Estate, the other assets which belong to the monarch.

The Duchy consists of a portfolio of lands, properties, and assets held in trust for the sovereign. The principal purpose of the estate is to provide a source of independent income. The Duchy consists of 18,433 ha (45,550 acres) of land holdings, including rural estates and farmland, urban developments, historic buildings, and commercial properties across England and Wales, particularly in Cheshire, Staffordshire, Derbyshire, Lincolnshire, Yorkshire, Lancashire, and the Savoy Estate in London. As of the financial year ending 31 March 2025, the estate was valued at £678.7 million. The net income of the duchy is paid to the reigning sovereign and in 2025-26 amounted to £25.2 million.

The Duchy exercises some powers and ceremonial duties of the Crown in the historic county of Lancashire, which includes the current ceremonial counties of Lancashire, Greater Manchester, and Merseyside, as well as the Furness area of Cumbria. The Duchy of Lancaster is one of two royal duchies: the other is the Duchy of Cornwall, which provides income to the Duke of Cornwall, a title which is held by the monarch's oldest son.

== History ==
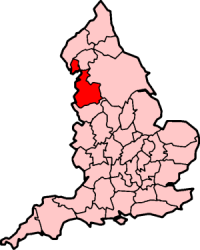
Lancashire County Palatine shown within England; this does not correspond to the landholdings of the Duchy of Lancaster

The estate that would become the Duchy of Lancaster originated in 1265, when Henry III granted his younger son, Edmund Crouchback, lands confiscated from Simon de Montfort, Earl of Leicester. In 1266, the estates of Robert de Ferrers, 6th Earl of Derby, another leading figure in the Second Barons' War, were added to the holdings. In 1267, the estate was formally constituted as the County, Honour, and Castle of Lancaster.

In 1284, Edmund received the Manor of Savoy near London from his mother, Eleanor of Provence, niece of the original grantee, Peter II, Count of Savoy. In 1351, Edward III elevated Lancashire to a county palatine, and Edmund’s grandson, Henry of Grosmont, was created Duke of Lancaster. Following Henry’s death, a royal charter issued in 1362 transferred the dukedom to his son-in-law, John of Gaunt, Earl of Lancaster, and to the heirs male of his body lawfully begotten in perpetuity.

In 1399 the Duchy of Lancaster, held by John of Gaunt's son Henry of Bolingbroke, merged with the crown on his appropriation of the throne (after the dispossession from Richard II). His first act as Henry IV was to declare that the Lancastrian inheritance be held separately from the other possessions of the Crown and should descend to male heirs. This separation of identities was confirmed in 1461 by Edward IV when he incorporated the inheritance and the palatinate responsibilities under the title of the Duchy of Lancaster, and stipulated that it be held separate from other inheritances by him and his heirs, but would however be inherited with the Crown, to which it was forfeited on the attainder of Henry VI. The duchy thereafter passed to the reigning monarch. On the death of King Charles I, the duchy came under the control of Parliament; this lasted until the restoration of King Charles II in 1660. In 1760, its separate identity preserved it from being surrendered with the Crown Estates in exchange for the civil list. It is primarily a landed inheritance belonging to the reigning sovereign (now Charles III). When George III surrendered his income from Crown lands in exchange for the Civil List, the Duchy of Lancaster was not mentioned at all as it was bankrupt for most of the century, due to previous monarchs selling its assets or granting leases for political favours. The monarch now does not have the right to sell off the capital assets for personal gain.

In 1830, the Whigs argued that revenues from the two duchies of Lancaster and Cornwall should go to the public, but to secure King William IV's support for the Reform Act 1832 they eventually approved the civil list and left the duchies in possession of the royal family. Parliament debated the two duchies' ownership multiple times, including when Queen Victoria and King Edward VII ascended the throne, respectively. In 1936, leader of the opposition Clement Attlee introduced an amendment to the civil list bill which would have seen the duchies surrendered in exchange for an adjusted annual sum of money tied to the actual cost of royal functions, but the amendment was defeated. In 1971, a private member's bill to nationalise the duchy was defeated, but more than 100 MPs supported it.

In 2011, the duchy established a rebalancing asset plan and sold most of the Winmarleigh estates farms in Lancashire, and donated a plot of land to the Winmarleigh Village Hall committee by June 2012.

In 2017, the Paradise Papers revealed that the duchy held investments in two offshore financial centres, the Cayman Islands and Bermuda. Both are British Overseas Territories of which Queen Elizabeth II was monarch. Labour Party Leader Jeremy Corbyn posited that the Queen should apologise, saying that anyone who keeps money offshore for tax avoidance purposes should "not just apologise for it, [but] recognise what it does to our society." A spokesman for the duchy said that all of their investments are audited and legitimate, and that the Queen voluntarily pays taxes on income she receives from duchy investments. The duchy's investments were revealed to include First Quench Retailing off-licences and rent-to-own retailer BrightHouse. The palace later stated that offshore investments had been exited by 2019.

== Role and administration ==
The duchy is administered on behalf of the sovereign by the chancellor of the duchy of Lancaster, a government minister appointed by the sovereign on the advice of the prime minister, and by the clerk of the council. The former position is sometimes held by a cabinet minister, but is always a ministerial post. For at least the last two centuries the duchy has been run by a deputy; the chancellor has rarely had any significant duties pertaining to its management but is available as a minister without portfolio and is answerable to Parliament for the effective running of the estate.

The monarch derives the privy purse from the revenues of the duchy. The surplus for the year ended 31 March 2025 was £24.4 million and the duchy was valued at £678.7 million. Its land holdings are not to be confused with the Crown Estate, whose revenues have been handed to the Treasury since the 18th century in exchange for the receipt of a yearly payment.

The Duchy Council's primary officers carrying out the estate's day-to-day duties are the clerk of the council of the duchy of Lancaster (the chief executive officer), the chairman of the council, and the chief finance officer. The chancellor is responsible for the appointment of the steward and the barmaster of the barmote courts on behalf of the sovereign in right of the duchy.

Since the Local Government Act 1972, the monarch in right of the duchy appoints the high sheriffs and lords lieutenant in Greater Manchester, Merseyside and Lancashire.

== Royal prerogative ==
Both the Duchy of Lancaster and the Duchy of Cornwall have special legal rights not available to other estates held by peers or counties palatine. For example, in the United Kingdom bona vacantia ("ownerless property") is generally administered by the Crown, but within the county palatine is administered by the duchy.

== Holdings ==
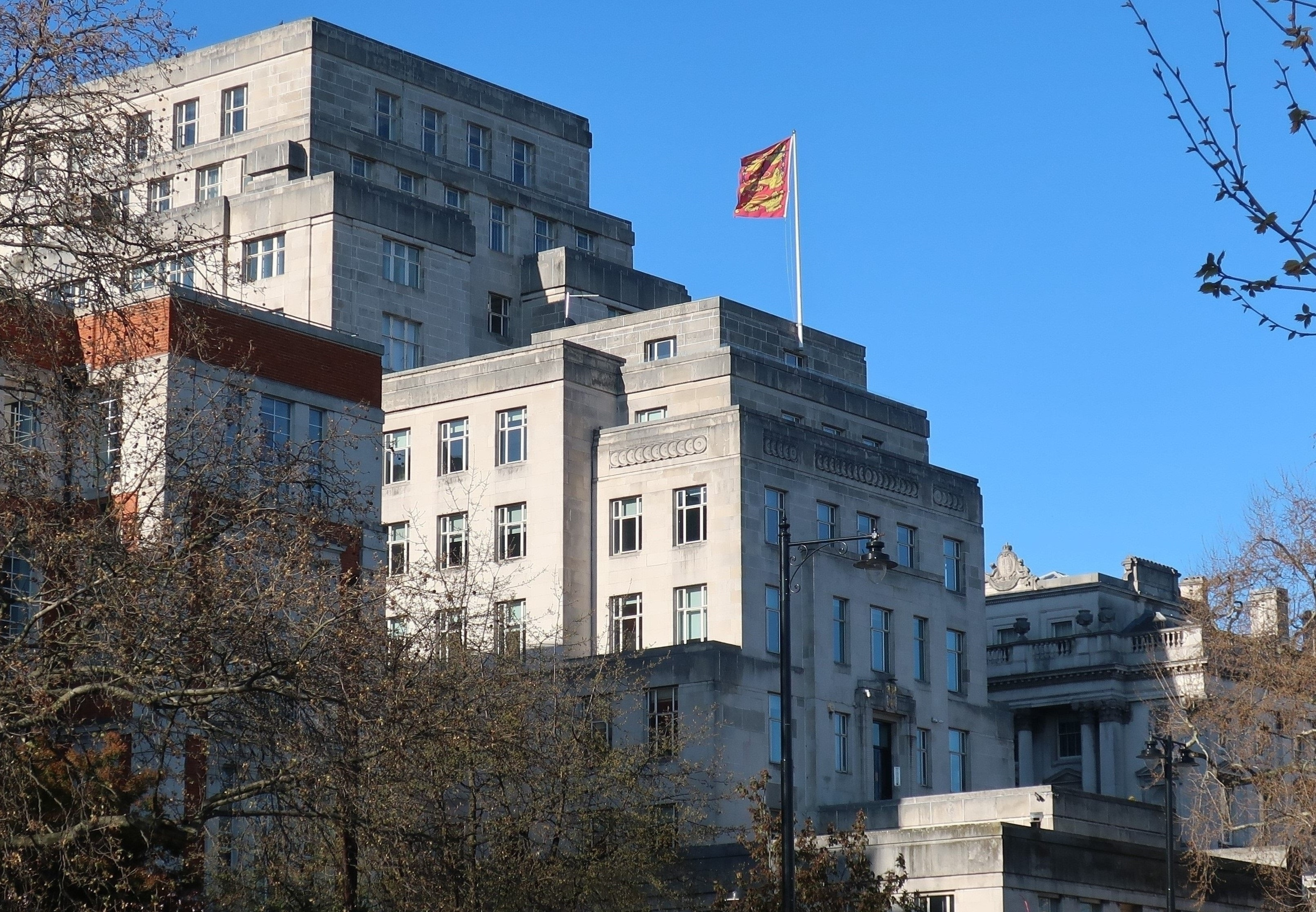
The duchy of Lancaster headquarters office in Lancaster Place, London. It flies the duchy flag.

The estate holdings of the duchy are divided into eight units called surveys: five rural, one urban, one foreshore and one mineral. The rural surveys make up most of the assets and area but the urban survey generates a greater income. The holdings were accrued over time through marriage, inheritance, gift and confiscation, and in modern times by purchase and sale.

=== Surveys ===
- The Cheshire Survey
  - Crewe principal estate – now 1,380 hectares (5 1/4 sq mi)
    - Crewe Hall Farm offices
- The Lancashire Survey is made up of five rural estates comprising a total of 3,900 hectares (15 sq mi)
  - Myerscough Estate – held since the 13th century.
  - Salwick Estate
  - Wyreside Estate
  - Whitewell Estate – 2,400 hectares (9 1/4 sq mi) in the Forest of Bowland
- The Staffordshire Survey – 3,000 hectares (11 1/2 sq mi) in Staffordshire, 60 let houses, including a saw mill, equestrian centres, offices and a private airfield, 240 hectares (600 acres) of forest
  - Tutbury Castle, Staffordshire
- The Yorkshire Survey – 6,800 hectares (26 1/4 sq mi)
  - Goathland estate – 4,100 hectares (15 3/4 sq mi)
    - heather moorland, managed as grouse moors, most of which are a Site of Special Scientific Interest (SSSI)
  - Cloughton estate – 1,000 hectares (3 3/4 sq mi) of arable land on the Yorkshire coast at Cloughton
    - Scalby Lodge
  - Pickering estate – mix of arable and livestock farming
    - Pickering Castle, North Yorkshire
  - Pontefract estate – a single large farm and several commercial properties
    - Pontefract Castle
- The Southern Survey – located mainly in Northamptonshire and Lincolnshire, 3,382 hectares (13 sq mi) of farm land
  - Higham Ferrers estate, Northamptonshire – acquired in 1266 plus two additional farms, contains a Vocational Skills Academy, a venture with Moulton College and an 18-hole golf course. In November 2018, an agreement between the duchy and the AFC Rushden & Diamonds football club resulted in land set aside for the purpose of creating a football field and facilities for the club.
  - Ogmore Estate – 1,500 hectares (5 3/4 sq mi) and has an active limestone quarry, Ogmore Castle and a golf course
  - Castleton estate – 114 hectares (280 acres) of grazing land
    - Peveril Castle, Derbyshire
    - Peak Cavern tourist attraction
    - historic mineral rights
  - Bolingbroke Castle, Lincolnshire
  - Park Farm
  - Donington
  - Quadring Fen Farm
  - Quadring
  - Drayton House Farm, Swineshead
- Urban Survey
  - The Savoy Estate, London
    - Savoy Chapel
    - Wellington House
  - Harrogate Estate – a care home, hotel and a school
    - Harrogate Ladies College
    - The Stray, 103 hectares (250 acres) of open space
    - Granville and Villiers House, residential complex
- The foreshore holdings include the Lancashire foreshore from Barrow in Furness in the north to the midpoint of the River Mersey in the south.
- Minerals

=== Castles and historic properties ===
- Bolingbroke Castle, Lincolnshire
- Chichele College, Northamptonshire
- Halton Castle, Cheshire
- Knaresborough Castle
- Lancaster Castle
- Ogmore Castle
- Peveril Castle
- Pickering Castle
- Pontefract Castle
- Savoy Chapel
- Tutbury Castle

== Revenue, income, and tax ==
As of the financial year ending 31 March 2022, the estate was valued at £652.8 million. The net income of the duchy is paid to the reigning sovereign, and amounted to £25.2 million in 2025-26. As the duchy is an inalienable asset of the Crown held in trust for future sovereigns, the current sovereign is not entitled to the portfolio's capital or capital profits. The Duchy of Lancaster is not subject to tax, but the monarch has voluntarily paid both income and capital gains tax since 1993. In June 2026, Buckingham Palace announced that King Charles III paid £11.7 million in taxes in 2023-24 and £12.9 million in taxes in 2024-25.

Revenue surplus or income from the Duchy of Lancaster has increased considerably over time. In 1952, the surplus was £100,000 a year. Almost 50 years later in 2000, the revenue surplus had increased to £5.8M. In 2010, the revenue surplus stood at £13.2M, and by 2017, the surplus had grown to £19.2M.

== Scandal ==
In October 2024, an investigation by The Sunday Times and Channel 4's Dispatches reported that the royal family profited from the NHS through a 15-year lease signed in 2023 by the duchy, which charged Guy's and St Thomas' NHS Foundation Trust £829,000 annually for a central London warehouse. This arrangement raised concerns about financial transparency. Critics, including Edward Leigh and Margaret Hodge, called for the royal duchies to pay corporation tax and condemned the monarchy for profiting from public services. The royal income sources included the Sovereign Grant, the Duchy of Lancaster, and the Duchy of Cornwall, which together generate significant revenue and enjoy favorable tax status. The investigation also highlighted fees charged for military training and mooring rights on royal properties, with both duchies asserting they operated as commercial entities in compliance with disclosure requirements while emphasizing commitments to sustainability and community support.

== See also ==
- Clerk of the Council of the Duchy of Lancaster
- List of office holders of the Duchy of Lancaster
