= GreenWood =

Family fun park

GreenWood Forest Park
- Previously known as GreenWood Forest Park, The GreenWood Centre

- Activity slides
- Interactive map of GreenWood Forest Park
- Location: Y Felinheli
- Coordinates: 53°10′50″N 4°11′45″W
- Status: Operating
- Opened: 1993
- Owner: Wood Family Group
- Attendance: 150,000

GreenWood Family Park (Welsh: Gelli Gyffwrdd, Welsh pronunciation: [ˈɡɛɬɪ ˈɡəfʊrð]), formerly GreenWood Forest Park and The GreenWood Centre, is a family fun park at Y Felinheli in Gwynedd, Wales. The park was opened by Stephen and Andrea Bristow in 1993 and attracts around 150,000 visitors a year.

== History ==
Bubble-blowing performer, 2011

After studying at Bangor University in the 1980s and working on tree conservation projects in Africa, Stephen and Andrea Bristow decided to establish an "environment education project to tell people about trees and forests from all over the world and raise awareness of the importance of forests" in Wales. They purchased 17 acres of land, opening in 1993 with walks and guided tours. Receiving 30,000 visitors a year, the couple could not financially sustain the project, especially during the winter. After raising money to build a slide, which opened in 2001, the park grew in popularity, with over 60,000 visitors that year.

By 2016, the park had over 100 employees and attracted around 150,000 visitors a year. Stephen and Andrea Bristow retired in 2017, selling the park to leisure attractions company Continuum Attractions.In July 2026 the park was sold to the Wood Family Group for £1.25 million.

== Rides and attractions ==
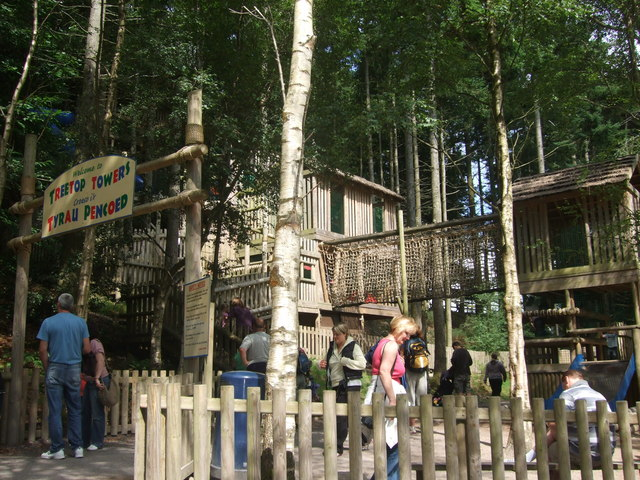
The Treetop Towers attraction.

The park contains adventure playgrounds, longbow shooting, slides, and a number of rides, among other attractions.

Green Dragon roller coaster

The Green Dragon ride at the park is the world's first "people-powered" roller coaster, powered only by the weight of the riders.

In May 2015, the park received £200,000 in funding from the Welsh Government for a new water ride and solar panels to generate 80% of the park's power requirements; the solar panels were unveiled in September 2015 and the ride, named SolarSplash, opened in March 2016.

=== SwampFlyer ride ===
In April 2011, GreenWood opened a 145m zip wire ride called the SwampFlyer. Less than a week after the ride opened, an 11-year-old boy fell to his death after being wrongly attached to the rope. In 2013, an inquest declared the death accidental. Managing director Stephen Bristow appeared in court in 2015 accused of not carrying out sufficient risk assessments for the ride. GreenWood admitted breaching health and safety regulations a year later and was subsequently fined £45,000.

The boy's death sparked calls for more regulations and guidance for zip wire rides.

== Awards ==
Slides, 2026

The park has received a number of environmental awards for its efforts to reduce resource use, improve the local environment, and support local community projects. It was ranked 9th out of all theme parks in the United Kingdom on Trip Advisor in 2014, and 8th in 2016. Stephen Bristow, managing director of the park, received an MBE in the 2009 New Year Honours for services to the tourist industry in North Wales.
