= Clerk of the Council of the Duchy of Lancaster =

Clerk of the Council of the Duchy of Lancaster is an office of the Duchy of Lancaster, in England.

Nathan Thompson has been Chief Executive, Clerk of the Council, Keeper of the Records and Surveyor General of the Duchy of Lancaster since 2013.

== Past holders of the office ==
- William Heydon (c. 1427 – 1512), clerk of Queen Elizabeth (wife of Edward IV, keeper of Registers, 1479 (source:)
- George Haydon (1545–1558)
- Richard Onslow (1561–1571)
- Sir Christopher Hatton (1571–1572)
- William Gerard (1589–1609)
- Sir Gilbert Gerard, Bt (1609–1640)
- Gilbert Gerard (1640–1653)
- Sir Gilbert Gerard (1655–1683)
- Benjamin Ayloffe (1685–1716)
- Thomas Lumley-Saunderson, 3rd Earl of Scarbrough (1716–1731)
- George Edgcumbe, 1st Earl of Mount Edgcumbe (1747–1762)
- William Masterman (1762–1786)
- George Villiers (1786–1827)
- Frederick Dawes Danvers (c.1837)
- Sir John Gardner Dillman Engleheart (1872–1899)
- William Rose Smith (1899–1921)
- Herbert Edward Mitchell (1921–1927)
- Louis Forbes Fergusson (1927–1945)
- Norman Richard Combe Warwick (1945–1952)
- Robert Somerville (1952–1970)
- Ernest Richard Wheeler (1970–1981)
- Michael Kershaw Ridley (1981–2000)
- Paul Robert Virgo Clarke (2000–2013)
- Nathan James Thompson (2013–present)

== See also ==
- List of office holders of the Duchy of Lancaster
