= Goolam Hoosen Kader Meeran =

British judge

Sir Goolam Hoosen Kader Meeran (born 12 April 1943) is a judge of the United Nations Dispute Tribunal.

Goolam Meeran grew up in South Africa during the apartheid regime. He graduated from the University of Manchester in 1969 and graduated with a MSc (Econ) in Social Psychology from the London School of Economics in 1970. He was awarded a diploma in law in 1981. He was called to the Bar (Gray's Inn) in 1982.

Meeran was appointed a JP in 1985. He became a part-time Chairman of Employment Tribunals in 1992, a full-time Chairman in 1993, an acting Regional Chairman in 1997, and a Regional Chairman in 1998. He was appointed a Judge on the South Eastern Circuit in 2002. He was President of the Employment Tribunals for England and Wales from 2002 to 2008. He retired as president of the Employment Tribunals for England and Wales in 2008, and as a circuit judge in 2009. Meeran was appointed a Knight Bachelor 'For services to the Administration of Justice' in the New Year's Honours List in January 2009.

Meeran was elected as a half-time judge of the United Nations Dispute Tribunal to begin on 1 July 2009 for a three-year term. He was re-appointed as half-time judge for a seven-year term beginning on 1 July 2012

He gave the first annual Kuttan Menon Memorial Lecture at the Law Society in 2006.
