= Mark Shucksmith =

David Mark Shucksmith OBE (born 25 August 1953) is Director of the Newcastle Institute for Social Renewal.

He was previously Professor of Town Planning at Newcastle University, and is also an adviser to the Joseph Rowntree Foundation "Action in Rural Areas" programme, a board member of the Countryside Agency, and visiting professor at the Centre for Rural Research at the University of Trondheim.

Before he was appointed to Newcastle University he was Professor of Land Economy at the University of Aberdeen.

Professor Shucksmith was appointed Officer of the Order of the British Empire (OBE) in the 2009 New Year Honours.
