= Lists of knights bachelor =

Knight Bachelor is the oldest and lowest-ranking form of knighthood in the British honours system; it is the rank granted to a man who has been knighted by the monarch but not inducted as a member of one of the organised orders of chivalry. Women are not eligible for knighthood; in practice, the equivalent, but higher, award for a woman is appointment as Dame Commander of the Order of the British Empire (founded in 1917).

== Knights bachelor by year of appointment ==
=== Nineteenth and Twentieth Centuries ===
- 1900
- 1901
- 1902
- 1903
- 1904
- 1905
- 1906
- 1907
- 1908
- 1909
- 1910
- 1911
- 1912
- 1913
- 1914
- 1915
- 1916
- 1917
- 1918
- 1919
- 1920
- 1921
- 2000

=== Twenty-first Century ===
- 2001
- 2002
- 2003
- 2004
- 2005
- 2006
- 2007
- 2008

== See also ==
- Orders, decorations, and medals of the United Kingdom
