= List of knights bachelor appointed in 1904 =

Knight Bachelor is the oldest and lowest-ranking form of knighthood in the British honours system. It is the rank granted to a man who has been knighted by the monarch but not inducted as a member of one of the organised orders of chivalry. Women are not knighted. The closest equivalent award for a woman is appointment as Dame Commander of the Order of the British Empire (founded in 1917).

In 1904, 68 people were appointed Knights Bachelor.

== Knights bachelor appointed in 1904 ==
Source: William A. Shaw, The Knights of England, vol. 2 (London: Sherratt and Hughes, 1906), pp. 417–420.

Date	Name	Notes
29 January 1904	Walter Mytton Colvin	Barrister
2 May 1904	James Aloysius Power	Mayor of Waterford
7 June 1904	Thomas Rolls Warrington	Justice
5 July 1904	George Barham	
5 July 1904	Thomas Barclay	
5 July 1904	Albert à Beckett	Formerly Assistant Accountant-General of the Army
5 July 1904	Arthur Bignold, MP	
5 July 1904	John Brickwood	
5 July 1904	Edward Townshend Candy	Indian Civil Service (retired). Formerly Puisne Judge of the High Court of Judicature at Bombay.
5 July 1904	Professor James Dewar, FRS	Royal Institution
5 July 1904	George Donaldson	
5 July 1904	George Doughty, MP	
5 July 1904	Edwin Harris Dunning	
5 July 1904	Edward Elgar, MusDoc	
5 July 1904	George Stegmann Gibb	
5 July 1904	Thomas Hewitt, KC	
5 July 1904	John Edward Gray Hill	
5 July 1904	Constantine Holman	
5 July 1904	Frank Thomas Marzials	Formerly Accountant-General of the Army
5 July 1904	Capt. David Munro	Formerly Inspector of Constabulary for Scotland
5 July 1904	Walter Richard Plummer, MP	
5 July 1904	William Handcock Pilkington	High Sheriff of County Kildare
5 July 1904	Alexander Oliver Riddell	
5 July 1904	William Phillips Sawyer	
5 July 1904	Benjamin Scott	
5 July 1904	Edward David Stern	
5 July 1904	Thomas Stevenson, MD	Scientific Analyst to the Home Office
5 July 1904	Henry Tanner	of the Office of Works
5 July 1904	Thomas Marchant Williams	
5 July 1904	William Lloyd Wise	
8 July 1904	Hugh Montagu Allan	
9 July 1904	Peter Nicol Russell	
11 July 1904	Pope Alexander Cooper	Chief Justice of Queensland
12 July 1904	Kendall Mathew St John Franks, MD	
13 July 1904	Andries Ferdinand Stockenstrom Maasdorp	Chief Justice of the Orange River Colony
14 July 1904	William Herbert Greaves	Chief Judge of Barbados
15 July 1904	Alfred Scott Scott-Gatty	Garter King of Arms
15 July 1904	The Hon. Edward Patrick Morris	Minister of Justice of Newfoundland
16 July 1904	William Thorne	Mayor of Cape Town, Cape of Good Hope
18 July 1904	Gooroo Dass Banarjee, MA, DL	Formerly a Puisne Judge of the High Court of Judicature at Fort William
19 July 1904	Alderman Robert Aldred Hampson	Mayor of Liverpool. Invested on the occasion of the laying of the foundation stone of Liverpool Cathedral.
19 July 1904	William Robert Burkitt	Indian Civil Service. Puisne Judge of the High Court of Judicature for the North-Western Provinces
20 July 1904	Lt-Col. David Parkes Masson, VD	Commandant, 1st Punjab Volunteer Rifle Corps; Member of the Council of the Lieutenant-Governor of the Punjab for Making Laws and Regulations
20 July 1904	Griffith Thomas	Mayor of Swansea. Invested on the occasion of the opening of a new dock at Swansea.
21 July 1904	Hallewell Rogers	Mayor of Birmingham. Invested on the occasion of the opening of new waterworks for the City of Birmingham.
10 August 1904	Reginald More Bray	Judge of the High Court
14 November 1904	Alfred Tristram Lawrence	Judge of the High Court
19 December 1904	Theodore Vivian Samuel Angier	
19 December 1904	George Washington Baxter	
19 December 1904	Richard Melvill Beachcroft	
19 December 1904	Joseph Arthur Bellamy	
19 December 1904	Henry Cook	
19 December 1904	John Tom McCraith	
19 December 1904	Alfred Major	
19 December 1904	Charles Hayes Marriott, MD	
19 December 1904	Shirley Foster Murphy	
19 December 1904	Surgeon Maj. Allan Perry, MD	Principal Civil Medical Officer and Inspector General of the Hospitals in Ceylon
19 December 1904	Thomas Pink	
19 December 1904	Professor William Japp Sinclair	Professor of Obstetrics and Gynaecology at the Victoria University of Manchester
19 December 1904	Matthew Henry Stephen	Formerly acting Chief Justice of the Supreme Court of New South Wales
19 December 1904	Joseph Wilson Swan, FRS, DSc	
19 December 1904	Aston Webb, RA	
19 December 1904	George Henry Jenkins	Clerk of the Parliaments and Clerk of the Legislative Council of the State of Victoria
19 December 1904	The Hon. William Henry Bundey	Judge of the Supreme Court of South Australia
19 December 1904	The Hon. Alfred Sandlings Cowley	Speaker of the Legislative Assembly of the State of Queensland
19 December 1904	Stephen Herbert Gatty	Chief Justice of Gibraltar
19 December 1904	William Henry Horwood	Chief Justice of the Supreme Court of Newfoundland
19 December 1904	William Llewellyn Lewis	Chief Justice of the Colony of British Hondorus
