= List of knights bachelor appointed in 1907 =

Knight Bachelor is the oldest and lowest-ranking form of knighthood in the British honours system; it is the rank granted to a man who has been knighted by the monarch but not inducted as a member of one of the organised orders of chivalry. Women are not knighted; in practice, the equivalent award for a woman is appointment as Dame Commander of the Order of the British Empire (founded in 1917).

== Knights bachelor appointed in 1907 ==
Date	Name	Notes	Ref
1 January 1907	Charles Edmund Fox	Chief Justice of the Chief Court of Lower Burma	
1 January 1907	Adamjee Peerbhoy, JP		
23 February 1907	Captain Pieter Canzius van Blommestein Bam, JP	Member of the Legislative Assembly of the Colony of the Cape of Good Hope; Chairman of the General Executive Committee of the South African Products Exhibition. On the occasion of the King and Queen's visit to the Royal Horticultural Hall for the opening of the Exhibition.	
27 February 1907	Frederick Albert Bosanquet, KC	Common Serjeant of London. On the occasion of the King and Queen's visit to the City of London to open the new Central Criminal Court building.	
27 February 1907	Charles Willie Mathews, KC	On the occasion of the King and Queen's visit to the City of London to open the new Central Criminal Court building.	
1 June 1907	William Pickford	Justice of the High Court of Justices	
28 June 1907	Professor Hubert von Herkomer, CVO, RA		
28 June 1907	John Gavey, CB		
28 June 1907	Colonel William Charles Eldon Serjeant, CB		
28 June 1907	Edmund McGildowny Hope Fulton, CSI	Indian Civil Service (retired)	
28 June 1907	William Angus		
28 June 1907	William James Baxter		
28 June 1907	Robert Buckell		
28 June 1907	William Randal Cremer, MP		
28 June 1907	Thomas Boor Crosby, MD	Sheriff of the City of London	
28 June 1907	James Donaldson	Vice-Chancellor and Principal of the University of St. Andrews	
28 June 1907	Nathaniel Dunlop		
28 June 1907	William Henry Dunn	Sheriff of the City of London	
28 June 1907	Whately Eliot, MICE		
28 June 1907	William Schwenck Gilbert		
28 June 1907	Stanley Harrington	Commissioner of National Education in Ireland	
28 June 1907	Nathaniel Joseph Highmore	Solicitor to His Majesty's Board of Customs	
28 June 1907	George Judd		
28 June 1907	Professor John Knox Laughton		
28 June 1907	Maurice Levy, MP		
28 June 1907	Melville Leslie Macnaghten	Assistant Commissioner of Metropolitan Police	
28 June 1907	James Mills		
28 June 1907	Francis Oppenheimer	Consul-General, Frankfort-on-Main	
28 June 1907	Horace Grece Regnart		
28 June 1907	Professor John Rhys	of Jesus College, Oxford	
28 June 1907	Henry Robson		
28 June 1907	James Brown Smith		
28 June 1907	Henry Rosborough Swanzy, MD		
28 June 1907	John Thomas		
28 June 1907	Frederick William Wilson		
28 June 1907	Rai Bahadur Bipin Krishna Bose, CIE		
28 June 1907	David Brand	Sheriff of Ayr	
28 June 1907	Alexander Hosie		
28 June 1907	William Quiller Orchardson, RA		
28 June 1907	Colonel Richard George Ellison, CVO	Ensign, His Majesty's Body Guard of the Yeomen of the Guard	
9 July 1907	Dr Henry Rudolf Reichel	Principal of the University College of North Wales. On the occasion of the King and Queen's visit to Bangor to lay the foundation stone of the University College's new buildings.	
13 July 1907	William Crossman	Lord Mayor of the City of Cardiff. On the occasion of the King and Queen's visit to Cardiff to open a new dock.	
15 August 1907	Thomas Mitchell, CVO	Manager, Constructive Department, Portsmouth Dockyard	
9 November 1907	William Adamson, CMG	Chairman of the Straits Settlements Association	
9 November 1907	Colonel John Smith Young, MVO	Secretary, Royal Patriotic Fund Corporation	
9 November 1907	William Henry Allchin, MD		
9 November 1907	Alfred Apperly		
9 November 1907	Joseph Compton Compton-Rickett, MP		
9 November 1907	John Irving Courtenay		
9 November 1907	Frank Crisp		
9 November 1907	Daniel Ford Goddard, MP		
9 November 1907	John Hare		
9 November 1907	Edward Thomas Holden, JP		
9 November 1907	Robert Edwin Matheson, LLD	Registrar General for Ireland	
9 November 1907	Francis Beaufort Palmer		
9 November 1907	John Pilter		
9 November 1907	Charles Horace Radford		
9 November 1907	Charles Santley		
9 November 1907	Augustus Charles Scovell		
9 November 1907	William John Thompson, MD		
9 November 1907	George White, MP		
9 November 1907	Charles Whitehead		
9 November 1907	Charles Moss	Chief Justice of Ontario	
9 November 1907	James Wilson Southern		
21 December 1907	Harry Trelawney Eve	Justice of the High Court of Justice	

== Notes ==
It was announced in the 1907 Birthday Honours that a knighthood was to be bestowed on Alfred Billson (the serving MP for North West Staffordshire), but he died before he received the accolade. On 19 August 1907, Edward VII declared that his widow, Lilla Billson, "shall have, hold and enjoy the style, title, place and precedence to which she would have been entitled had her husband survived to receive the honour of Knight Bachelor at the hands of His Majesty".
