= List of knights bachelor appointed in 1901 =

Knight Bachelor is the oldest and lowest-ranking form of knighthood in the British honours system; it is the rank granted to a man who has been knighted by the monarch but not inducted as a member of one of the organised orders of chivalry. Women are not knighted; in practice, the equivalent award for a woman is appointment as Dame Commander of the Order of the British Empire (founded in 1917).

In 1901, 30 people were appointed Knights Bachelor.

== Knights bachelor appointed in 1901 ==
Source: William A. Shaw, The Knights of England, vol. 2 (London: Sherratt and Hughes, 1906), pp. 408–409.

Date	Name	Notes
16 January 1901	Arthur Robert Wallace, DL	Principal Chief Clerk, Secretary's Office, Dublin Castle
16 January 1901	Edward Matthew Hodgson	Chairman of the Rathmines Urban District Council
9 February 1901	Edward Henry Busk	Chairman of Convocation of the University of London
9 February 1901	Robert Harvey	High Sheriff of Cornwall
9 February 1901	Edward Wollaston Kocker	Registrar of the Cinque Ports
9 February 1901	Alfred Cooper	
9 February 1901	Hiram Stevens Maxim	
9 February 1901	Joseph Sykes Rymer	Lord Mayor of York
11 February 1901	Hon. Henry John Miller	Speaker of the Legislative Council of the Colony of New Zealand
11 February 1901	Hugh Adcock	Consulting Physician-in-Chief to the Shah of Persia
31 October 1901	John Quick, LLD	Appointed on the occasion of the Duke and Duchess of York's visit.
31 October 1901	James Graham, MD	Member of the Legislative Assembly of the State of New South Wales; Mayor of the City of Sydney. Appointed on the occasion of the Duke and Duchess of York's visit.
31 October 1901	Hon. Samuel Gillott	Member of the Legislative Assembly of the State of Victoria; Attorney-General for the State of Victoria; Mayor of the City of Melbourne. Appointed on the occasion of the Duke and Duchess of York's visit.
31 October 1901	Louis Victor Delafaye	Chief Judge of the Supreme Court of the Colony of Mauritius. Appointed on the occasion of the Duke and Duchess of York's visit
31 October 1901	Ebenezer John Buchanan	Senior Puisne Judge of the Colony of the Cape of Good Hope. Appointed on the occasion of the Duke and Duchess of York's visit
31 October 1901	Benjamin Wesley Greenacre	Member of the Legislative Assembly of the Colony of Natal. Appointed on the occasion of the Duke and Duchess of York's visit
31 October 1901	Thomas George Shaughnessy	President of the Canadian Pacific Railway Company. Appointed on the occasion of the Duke and Duchess of York's visit
4 November 1901	Arthur Richard Jelf	Judge of the High Court
4 November 1901	Joseph Walton	Judge of the High Court
7 November 1901	John Stanley, KC	Chief Justice of the High Court of Judicature for the North Western Provinces, India
10 December 1901	Charles Swinfen Eady	One of the Justices of His Majesty's High Court of Justice
10 December 1901	George Gough Arbuthnot	
10 December 1901	George Bullough	
10 December 1901	Anderson Critchett, FRCS	Honorary Surgeon Oculist to His Majesty
10 December 1901	George Hussey	Mayor of Southampton
10 December 1901	Archibald Campbell Lawrie	On retirement as Puisne Justice of the Supreme Court of Ceylon
10 December 1901	James Ernest Spencer, MP	
10 December 1901	Albert de Rutzen	Chief Magistrate of the Metropolitan Police Courts
19 December 1901	Joseph Ignatius Little	Chief Justice of the Supreme Court of Newfoundland
19 December 1901	Samuel Brownlow Gray	Chief Justice of the Bermuda Islands
