= List of knights bachelor appointed in 1905 =

Knight Bachelor is the oldest and lowest-ranking form of knighthood in the British honours system. It is granted to a man who has been knighted by the monarch but not inducted into one of the organised orders of chivalry. Women are not knighted; instead, the equivalent honor is appointment as Dame Commander of the Order of the British Empire (founded in 1917).

== Knights bachelor appointed in 1905 ==
Date	Name	Notes	Ref
10 February 1905	John Foster Stevens	Judge of the High Court of Judicature at Fort William in Bengal	
10 February 1905	Henry Bargrave Deane	Judge of the High Court of England and Wales	
30 June 1905	John Cameron Lamb, CB, CMG		
30 June 1905	Edward William Brabrook, CB		
30 June 1905	Augustus Henry Oakes, CB		
30 June 1905	Jervoise Athelstane Baines, CSI		
30 June 1905	Philip Crampton Smyly		
30 June 1905	George Anderson		
30 June 1905	Professor Thomas McCall-Anderson		
30 June 1905	William Bousfield		
30 June 1905	Thomas Frederick Chavasse		
30 June 1905	Thomas Skewes-Cox		
30 June 1905	Edward William Fithian		
30 June 1905	Robert Gardner		
30 June 1905	Major Nicholas Gosselin		
30 June 1905	Augustus Helder		
30 June 1905	Alexander Blackie William Kennedy		
30 June 1905	Boverton Redwoood		
30 June 1905	James Clifton Robinson		
30 June 1905	Colonel Samuel Alexander Sadler		
30 June 1905	William A. Shipley		
30 June 1905	William Josiah Smyly		
30 June 1905	Isidore Spielmann		
30 June 1905	Thomas Vezey Strong		
30 June 1905	George Joseph Woodman		
30 June 1905	Francis Taylor Piggott	Chief Justice of the Supreme Court of the Colony of Hong Kong	
30 June 1905	The Honourable Samuel McCaughey	Member of the Legislative Council of the State of New South Wales	
30 June 1905	Philip Sydney Jones, MD		
30 June 1905	Edmond Sinclair Stevenson	Member of the Medical Council of the Colony of the Cape of Good Hope	
30 June 1905	William St John Carr		
13 July 1905	Thomas Thornhill Shann	Lord Mayor of Manchester. On the occasion of the King and Queen's visit to the city open a new dock and shipyard.	
24 July 1905	Joseph Jonas	Lord Mayor of the City of Sheffield	
24 July 1905	William Stephens	Mayor of the Borough of Salford	
9 November 1905	James Bailey, MP		
9 November 1905	James Barr, MD		
9 November 1905	Arthur Chance	President of the Royal College of Surgeons in Ireland	
9 November 1905	George Edwin Couzens	Mayor of Portsmouth	
9 November 1905	Maurice Edward Dockrell		
9 November 1905	Walter Newton Fisher		
9 November 1905	Edward Cecil Hertslet	His Majesty's Consul-General, Antwerp	
9 November 1905	Walter Johnson		
9 November 1905	James Knox		
9 November 1905	John McFadyean	of the Royal Veterinary College	
9 November 1905	Joseph Herbert Marshall		
9 November 1905	Robert Purvis, MP		
9 November 1905	Commander Hamilton Pyni Freer-Smith	of the Home Office	
9 November 1905	Ernest Augustus Northcote	Chief Justice of the Colony of Trinidad and Tobago	
9 November 1905	Henry Rawlins Pipon Schooles	Chief Justice of Gibraltar	
9 November 1905	Lieutenant-Colonel Henry Mill Pellatt	2nd Regiment, 'Canadian Infantry (Queen's Own Rifles of Canada)	
9 November 1905	William Newton	Member of the Council of Government of the Colony of Mauritius, and one of His Majesty's Counsel for that Colony	
9 November 1905	John George Fraser	Member of the Legisr lative Council of the Orange River Colony	
9 November 1905	Stanley Bois	Member of the Legislative Council of Ceylon	
9 November 1905	Havilland Walter de Sausmarez	Judge of His Majesty's Supreme Consular Court for China and Corea	
9 November 1906	Malcolm McNeill, CB		
15 November 1905	Edwin Andrew Cornwall	Chairman of the London County Council	
18 December 1905	Colonel Charles Wyndham Murray, CB, MP		
18 December 1905	William James Bull, MP		
18 December 1905	Clement Kinloch Cooke,		
18 December 1905	Major William Eden Evans-Gordon, MP		
18 December 1905	Samuel Paire		
18 December 1905	Charles Frederick Claverhouse Graham		
18 December 1905	Francis William Lowe, MP		
18 December 1905	Horace Edward Moss		
18 December 1905	Major Harry North		
18 December 1905	Henry E. Randall		
18 December 1905	John S. Randles, MP		
18 December 1905	John Robinson		
18 December 1905	William Henry Vaudrey		
18 December 1905	Edgcombe Venning		
18 December 1905	John Lawson Walton, KC, MP	Attorney-General	
18 December 1905	William Snowdon Robson, KC	Solicitor General	
