= List of knights bachelor appointed in 1918 =

Knight Bachelor is the oldest and lowest-ranking form of knighthood in the British honours system; it is the rank granted to a man who has been knighted by the monarch but not inducted as a member of one of the organised orders of chivalry. Women are not knighted; in practice, the equivalent award for a woman is appointment as Dame Commander of the Order of the British Empire (founded in 1917).

== Knights bachelor appointed in 1918 ==
Date	Name	Notes	Ref
6 February 1918	Robert N. Anderson	Mayor of Londonderry	
6 February 1918	William Nicholas Atkinson, ISO	lately Divisional Inspector of Mines	
6 February 1918	Barclay Josiah Baron, MB, CM	Lord Mayor of Bristol	
6 February 1918	James Bird	Clerk of the London County Council	
6 February 1918	James Boyton, MP		
6 February 1918	Edmond Browne		
6 February 1918	Robert Bruce	Editor of the Glasgow Herald	
6 February 1918	James Campbell	Chairman of the North of Scotland College of Agriculture	
6 February 1918	Emsley Carr	Editor and part proprietor of the News of the World	
6 February 1918	William Henry Clemmey	Mayor of Bootle	
6 February 1918	David S. Davies	formerly High Sheriff of Denbighshire; Chairman of the County Appeal Tribunal and Pensions Committee	
6 February 1918	Arthur Fell, Esq., MP		
6 February 1918	S. Archibald Garland	Mayor of Chichester 1912–18	
6 February 1918	Charles Henry Gibbs		
6 February 1918	Ernest W. Glover		
6 February 1918	William Henry Hadow, MA, MusDoc	Principal of Armstrong College. Neweastle-on-Tyne	
6 February 1918	Anthony Hope Hawkins		
6 February 1918	Thomas Jeeves Horder, MD		
6 February 1918	John Morris Jones, MA	Professor of Welsh at the University College of North Wales, Bangor	
6 February 1918	William F. Jury		
6 February 1918	John Scott Keltic, FRGS		
6 February 1918	John Lavery, ARA		
6 February 1918	John Lithiby, CB	Legal Adviser to the Local Government Board	
6 February 1918	Sidney James Low, MA	Lecturer on Imperial and Colonial History, University of London	
6 February 1918	George Lunn	Lord Mayor of Newcastle-on-Tyne	
6 February 1918	Edwin Landseer Lutyens, ARA		
6 February 1918	James William McCraith		
6 February 1918	Charles Mandleberg		
6 February 1918	Thomas Rogersoh Marsden		
6 February 1918	Henry Milner-White, LLD		
6 February 1918	Alpheus Cleophas Morton, MP		
6 February 1918	Edward M. Mountain		
6 February 1918	David Murray, RA	President of the Royal Institute of Painters in Water Colours	
6 February 1918	Herbert Nield, KC, MP	Recorder of York	
6 February 1918	James George Owen	Mayor of Exeter	
6 February 1918	John Phillips, MD	Professor Emeritus of Obstetric Medicine at King's College, London	
6 February 1918	Edmund Bamfylde Phipps, CB	late General Secretary to the Ministry of Munitions	
6 February 1918	Philip Edward Pilditch		
6 February 1918	Thomas Putnam		
6 February 1918	Stephen B. Quin	Mayor of Limerick	
6 February 1918	Patrick Rose-Innes, KC		
6 February 1918	William Watson Rutherford, MP		
6 February 1918	William Henry Seager	Vice-chairman of the Cardiff and Bristol Channel Shipowners' Association	
6 February 1918	Robert Russell Simpson, WS		
6 February 1918	George Frederick Sleight		
6 February 1918	Arthur Spurgeon		
6 February 1918	Lt-Col. Harold Jalland Stiles	RAMC	
6 February 1918	Edmund Stonehouse	Mayor of Wakefield	
6 February 1918	Henry Tozer	Alderman of the City of Westminster	
6 February 1918	Leslie Ward		
6 February 1918	Howard Kingsley Wood		
6 February 1918	Alfred William Yeo, MP		
6 February 1918	Maj. Andrew Macphail	Canadian Army Medical Corps (Overseas Forces); Professor of the History of Medicine, McGill University, Montreal	
6 February 1918	Hon. Col. William Daniel Henry, CIE, VD, ADC	Could not be dubbed at the investiture in March 1918.	
6 February 1918	Maj.-Gen. Donald Alexander Macdonald, CMG, ISO	Quartermaster-General, Canadian Militia	
6 February 1918	Adm. Charles Kingsmill, RN (Ret.)	Director of Naval Service in the Dominion of Canada	
6 February 1918	William Jeames Gage		
6 February 1918	The Hon. Charles Gregory Wade, KC	Agent-General in London for the State of New South Wales	
6 February 1918	Frederick William Young, LLB	Agent-General in London for the State of South Australia	
6 February 1918	The Hon. Simon Fraser	formerly a Member of the Senate of the Commonwealth of Australia	
6 February 1918	The Hon. William Fraser	Minister of Public Works of the Dominion of New Zealand	
6 February 1918	John Robert Sinclair	Representative of New Zealand on the Royal Commission on the Natural Resources, Trade and Legislation of certain portions of His Majesty's Dominions	
6 February 1918	The Hon. John Carnegie-Dove-Wilson, LLB	Judge President, Natal Provincial Division, Supreme Court of South Africa	
6 February 1918	Maj. William Northrup McMillan	25th (Service) Battalion, The Royal Fusiliers	
6 February 1918	Bartle Henry Temple Frere	Chief Justice of Gibraltar	
6 February 1918	Henry Adolphus Byden Rattigan	Chief Judge of Chief Court, Punjab	
6 February 1918	Thomas Frederic Dawson Miller, KC	Chief Justice of the High Court of Judicature at Patna	
6 February 1918	Arthur Robert Anderson, CIE, CBE		
6 February 1918	Edward Fairless Barber	Additional Member of the Council of the Governor of Madras for making Laws and Regulations	
6 February 1918	Binod Chunder Mitter	Barrister-at-Law, lately Officiating Advocate-General, Bengal, and a Member of the Council of the Governor for making Laws and Regulations	
6 February 1918	Col. Harry Albert Lawless Hepper	(Major, R.E., retired)	
6 February 1918	Thomas William Birkett		
1 June 1918	Alfred Washington Guest Ranger, MA, DCL		
26 June 1918	Frank Baines, CBE, MVO	Principal Architect, Office of Works	
26 June 1918	Harry Baldwin, MBCS		
26 June 1918	James Benjamin Ball	Controller of Timber Supplies	
26 June 1918	Charles Henry Burge, JP		
26 June 1918	Alfred Butt		
26 June 1918	Thomas Octavius Callender		
26 June 1918	Col. Charles Chalmers, JP, DL		
26 June 1918	John Charles Lewis Coward, KC		
26 June 1918	Archibald D. Dawnay	Mayor of Wandsworth	
26 June 1918	Harry Seymour Foster, JP, DL		
26 June 1918	John Meadows Frost, JP	Mayor of Chester	
26 June 1918	Walter Matthew Gibson, CVO, ISO		
26 June 1918	Park Goff		
26 June 1918	Maj. Archibald Gilbey Gold, JP, DL		
26 June 1918	James Hacking	Mayor of Bury	
26 June 1918	John George Harbottle, JP		
26 June 1918	Harry Thomas Hatt		
26 June 1918	Alexander G. Jeans	Editor of the Liverpool Post	
26 June 1918	John Merry Le Sage		
26 June 1918	Thomas William Lewis	Stipendiary Magistrate, Cardiff	
26 June 1918	Richard David Muir		
26 June 1918	Peter Peacock	Mayor of Warrington	
26 June 1918	George H. Peters, JP		
26 June 1918	Thomas Lee Roberts		
26 June 1918	John Reid, JP, DL		
26 June 1918	Col. Arthur W. Mayo-Robson, CB, CVO, FRCS		
26 June 1918	Gerald Walter Roffey		
26 June 1918	Edward Denison Ross, CIE, PhD	Principal of the School of Oriental Studies	
26 June 1918	Edgar Christian Sanders		
26 June 1918	Ernest Shentall	Mayor of Chesterfield	
26 June 1918	Peter Wyatt Squire		
26 June 1918	William Alexander Forster Todd	Lord Mayor of York	
26 June 1918	Alfred H. Warren, JP	Mayor of Poplar	
26 June 1918	Ernest Edward Wild, KC		
26 June 1918	Percy Woodhouse, JP		
26 June 1918	William Edward Foster, FSA		
26 June 1918	Henry Albert Alcazar, KC	Member of the Executive Council and Unofficial Member of the Legislative Council of frhe Colony of Trinidad and Tobago	
26 June 1918	Robert William Hamilton	Chief Justice of the High Court of East Africa	
26 June 1918	The Hon. Henry Edward Agincourt Hodges	a Judge of the Supreme Court of the State of Victoria	
26 June 1918	Robert Nelson Kotze	Government Mining Engineer, Department of Mines and Industries in the Union of South Africa	
26 June 1918	The Honourable Hormisdas Laporte	Chairman of the War Purchasing Commission, Canada	
26 June 1918	Robert Blair Roden	Chief Justice of the Colony of British Honduras	
26 June 1918	John William Salmond, KC, LLB	Solicitor-General of the Dominion of New Zealand	
26 June 1918	William John Sowden		
26 June 1918	Gordon Fraser	Additional Member of the Legislative Council of the Governor of Madras	
26 June 1918	Deba Prasad Sarbadhikari, CIE, LLD		
26 June 1918	Nilratan Sarkar	Additional Member of the Legislative Council of the Governor of Bengal	
26 June 1918	Logie Pirie Watson	Member of the Legislative Council of the Lieutenant Governor of the United Provinces of Agra and Oudh	
26 June 1918	Hormasji Ardeshir Wadia		
26 June 1918	Robert Aitken		
26 June 1918	Rai Bahadur Seth Sarupchand Hukamchand		
6 July 1918	Harry Frankland Hepburn	Sheriff of the City of London	
6 July 1918	George Rowland Blades	Sheriff of the City of London	

== Notes ==
The Hon. Charles Johnston, Speaker of the Legislative Council of the Dominion of New Zealand, died before his Patent of Knighthood could be completed.
