= List of knights bachelor appointed in 2001 =

Knight Bachelor is the oldest and lowest-ranking form of knighthood in the British honours system; it is the rank granted to a man who has been knighted by the monarch but not inducted as a member of one of the organised orders of chivalry. Women are not knighted; in practice, the equivalent award for a woman is appointment as Dame Commander of the Order of the British Empire (founded in 1917).

== Knights bachelor appointed in 2001 ==
| Date gazetted | Name | Notes | Ref. |
|---|---|---|---|
| 8 February 2001 | The Honourable Mr. Justice (Christopher John) Pitchford | | |
| 16 February 2001 | The Honourable Mr. Justice (Brian Henry) Leveson | | |
| 22 February 2001 | The Honourable Mr. Justice (Raymond Evan) Jack | | |
| 23 February 2001 | The Honourable Mr. Justice (Duncan Brian Walter) Ouseley | | |
| 6 March 2001 | The Honourable Mr. Justice (Terence Michael Elkan Barnet) Etherton | | |
| 7 March 2001 | The Honourable Mr. Justice (Richard George Bramwell) McCombe | | |
| 9 March 2001 | The Honourable Mr. Justice (Colin Crichton) Mackay | | |
| 9 March 2001 | The Honourable Mr. Justice (Robert Michael) Owen | | |
| 30 April 2001 | The Honourable Mr. Justice (John Edward) Mitting | | |
| 15 May 2001 | The Honourable Mr. Justice (David Roderick) Evans | | |
| 16 June 2001 | Professor George Sayers Bain, President and Vice Chancellor, The Queen's University of Belfast. For services to Higher Education and to the Low Pay Commission. | | |
| 16 June 2001 | Professor Anthony Edward Bottoms, Criminologist. For services to the Criminal Justice System. | | |
| 16 June 2001 | Percy James Butler, CBE, DL. For charitable services, especially in Hampshire. | | |
| 16 June 2001 | Neil Robert Chalmers, Director, The Natural History Museum. For services to Museums. | | |
| 16 June 2001 | William Frederick Cotton, CBE, Chairman, Meridian Broadcasting. For services to Television Broadcasting and to Marie Curie Cancer Care. | | |
| 16 June 2001 | Donald Thomas Younger Curry, CBE, Chairman, Meat and Livestock Commission. For services to the Meat and Livestock Industries. | | |
| 16 June 2001 | Graham Martin Doughty, Leader, Derbyshire County Council. For services to Local Government. | | |
| 16 June 2001 | Joseph Anthony Dwyer, President, Institution of Civil Engineers. For services to Liverpool Vision. | | |
| 16 June 2001 | Terence (Terry) Farrell, CBE, Architect. For services to Architecture and Urban Design. | | |
| 16 June 2001 | James Galway, OBE For services to music. | | |
| 16 June 2001 | Christopher Charles Gent, Chief Executive, Vodafone Group plc. For services to the Mobile Telecommunications Industry. | | |
| 16 June 2001 | Professor Robert Brian Heap, CBE, FRS For services to Reproductive Biology and to International Science. | | |
| 16 June 2001 | Peter James Denton Job, Chief Executive, Reuters plc. For services to the Information and Media Industry. | | |
| 16 June 2001 | Professor John Andrew Likierman, Managing Director, Financial Management, Reporting and Audit, HM Treasury. | | |
| 16 June 2001 | Michael Nicholson Lord, Second Deputy Chairman of Ways and Means and a Deputy Speaker. For services to Parliament. | | |
| 16 June 2001 | Frank Budge Lowe. For services to the Advertising Industry and for charitable services. | | |
| 16 June 2001 | Professor Donald Neil MacCormick, MEP, QC, Regius Professor of Public Law, University of Edinburgh. For services to Scholarship in Law. | | |
| 16 June 2001 | Terence Hedley Matthews, OBE For services to Industry and to Wales. | | |
| 16 June 2001 | Ian Mills, lately Regional Chairman, NHS Executive, London Regional Office. For services to the NHS. | | |
| 16 June 2001 | Robert Ogden, CBE, Chairman, Ogden Group of Companies. For charitable services in Yorkshire. | | |
| 16 June 2001 | Keith Povey, QPM, HM Inspector of Constabulary. For services to the Police. | | |
| 16 June 2001 | Kevin Joseph Satchwell, Headteacher, Thomas Telford School, Shropshire. For services to Education. | | |
| 16 June 2001 | John Young Stewart, OBE For services to Motor Racing. | | |
| 16 June 2001 | Peter Vardy, Chairman, Reg Vardy plc. For services to Business and to Education in North East England. | | |
| 16 June 2001 | Robert Brian Williamson, CBE, Chairman, LIFFE. For services to the Financial Services Industry. | | |
| 16 June 2001 | Professor Alan Geoffrey Wilson, Vice Chancellor, University of Leeds. For services to Higher Education. | | |
| 16 June 2001 | The Honourable Allan Kemakeza | For services to policing and politics. (In the Solomon Islands honours list) | |
| 2 July 2001 | The Honourable Mr Justice (Ronald Eccles) Weatherup. | | |
| 20 August 2001 | Mr Justice (Percival Burton Curtis) Hall, Chief Justice Designate of The Bahamas | | |
| 1 November 2001 | The Honourable Mr Justice (Jeremy Lionel) Cooke. | | |
| 1 November 2001 | The Honourable Mr Justice (Nigel Anthony Lamert) Davis | | |
| 21 November 2001 | The Honourable Mr Justice (Brian Richard) Keith. | | |
| 11 December 2001 | The Honourable Mr Justice (Peter Henry) Gross. | | |
| 31 December 2001 | Patrick John Armstrong, for services to the Police. | | |
| 31 December 2001 | John Lionel Beckwith, CBE, for services to Youth Sport. | | |
| 31 December 2001 | Albert Bore, leader of Birmingham City Council. For services to Local Government. | | |
| 31 December 2001 | Professor Richard John Brook, OBE, formerly chief executive of the Engineering and Physical Sciences Research Council. For services to Science and Engineering. | | |
| 31 December 2001 | Michael Sydney Buckley, parliamentary commissioner for Administration and Health Service commissioner for England, Wales and Scotland. | | |
| 31 December 2001 | Anthony Thomas Burden, QPM, Chief Constable of South Wales Police. For services to the Police. | | |
| 31 December 2001 | de Vic Graham Carey, Bailiff of Guernsey. For services to the Crown. | | |
| 31 December 2001 | Professor Graeme Robertson Dawson Catto, for services to Medicine and to Medical Education. | | |
| 31 December 2001 | Timothy Peter Plint Clifford, Director-General of the National Galleries of Scotland. For services to the Arts. | | |
| 31 December 2001 | Professor Ronald Urwick Cooke, Vice-Chancellor of the University of York. For services to Higher Education. | | |
| 31 December 2001 | Professor Bernard Crick, for services to Citizenship in Schools and to Political Studies. | | |
| 31 December 2001 | Professor Liam Joseph Donaldson, chief medical officer for England, Department of Health. | | |
| 31 December 2001 | Charles Brandon Gough, formerly chairman of the Review Body on Doctors' and Dentists' Remuneration. For public service. | | |
| 31 December 2001 | Nicholas Thomas Grimshaw, CBE for services to Architecture. | | |
| 31 December 2001 | Iain Robert Hall, Headteacher of Parrs Wood Technology College, Manchester. For services to Education. | | |
| 31 December 2001 | Professor Gabriel Horn, FRS for services to Neurobiology and to the Advancement of Scientific Research. | | |
| 31 December 2001 | Professor Ian McColl Kennedy, for services to Bioethics and to Medical Law. | | |
| 31 December 2001 | Ben Kingsley. Actor. For services to Drama. | | |
| 31 December 2001 | Terence Patrick Leahy, chief executive of Tesco plc. For services to Food Retailing. | | |
| 31 December 2001 | Professor Alistair George James MacFarlane, CBE, FRS, rector of UHI Millennium Institute. For services to Education. | | |
| 31 December 2001 | Graham John Melmoth, chief executive of Co-operative Group Ltd. For services to the Retail Industry. | | |
| 31 December 2001 | Edward Benjamin Crofton Osmotherly, CB, formerly chairman of the Commission for Local Administration in England. For services to Local Government. | | |
| 31 December 2001 | Alan William Parker, CBE, film director and chairman of the Film Council. For services to the Film Industry. | | |
| 31 December 2001 | Robin Keith Saxby, executive chairman of ARM Holdings plc. For services to the Information Technology Industry. | | |
| 31 December 2001 | Professor Martin Nicholas Sweeting, OBE, FRS, chief executive of Surrey Satellite Technology Ltd and director of the Surrey Space Centre. For services to Microsatellite Engineering. | | |
| 31 December 2001 | Jimmy Leslie Ronald Young, CBE, for services to Radio Broadcasting. | | |
| 31 December 2001 | Rudolph Ion Joseph Agnew. For services to international human rights and conservation. | | |
| 31 December 2001 | Deryck Maughan. For services to British business and commercial interests in the USA. | | |
