= List of knights bachelor appointed in 1902 =

Knight Bachelor is the oldest and lowest-ranking form of knighthood in the British honours system; it is the rank granted to a man who has been knighted by the monarch but not inducted as a member of one of the organised orders of chivalry. Women are not knighted; in practice, the equivalent award for a woman is appointment as Dame Commander of the Order of the British Empire (founded in 1917).

In 1902, 100 people were appointed Knights Bachelor.

== Knights bachelor appointed in 1902 ==
Source: William A. Shaw, The Knights of England, vol. 2 (London: Sherratt and Hughes, 1906), pp. 410–414.

| Date | Name | Notes |
|---|---|---|
| 11 August 1902 | John Olphert | Gentleman Usher to the Lord Lieutenant of Ireland |
| 11 August 1902 | John Hamilton Franks | Secretary to the Irish Land Commission |
| 11 August 1902 | John George Barton | Commissioner of Valuation for Ireland |
| 11 August 1902 | James Brown Dougherty | Assistant Under Secretary to the Lord Lieutenant of Ireland |
| 11 August 1902 | Francis Henry Miller | Mayor of Londonderry |
| 11 August 1902 | Thomas Myles, MD | Formerly President of the Royal College of Surgeons of Ireland |
| 11 August 1902 | Vincent Nash | High Sheriff of the City of Limerick |
| 11 August 1902 | George Roche | Formerly President of the Incorporated Law Society of Ireland |
| 11 August 1902 | William Whitla, MD | |
| 11 August 1902 | James Murphy | President of the Dublin Chamber of Commerce |
| 11 August 1902 | Robert Lloyd Patterson | |
| 14 August 1902 | Edward Albert Stone | Chief Justice of the State of Western Australia |
| 14 August 1902 | Hon. Arthur Rutledge, KC | Attorney-General of the State of Queensland |
| 14 August 1902 | Hon. Henry Norman MacLaurin, LLD, MD, MA | Chancellor of the University of Sydney; Member of the Legislative Council of New South Wales |
| 14 August 1902 | Henri Elzéar Taschereau, KC, LLD | Puisne Judge of the Supreme Court of the Dominion of Canada |
| 14 August 1902 | Hon. Adye Douglas (later Thorpe-Douglas) | President of the Legislative Council of the State of Tasmania |
| 14 August 1902 | John Lancelot Stirling, LLB | President of the Legislative Council of the State of South Australia |
| 14 August 1902 | Hon. Edward D'Alton Shea | President of the Legislative Council of the Colony of Newfoundland |
| 14 August 1902 | Hon. Robert Boak | President of the Legislative Council of the Province of Nova Scotia, Canada |
| 14 August 1902 | William Russell Russell | Member of the House of Representatives of the Colony of New Zealand |
| 14 August 1902 | John Logan Campbell, MD | Formerly Mayor of Auckland, New Zealand |
| 2 October 1902 | Hon. James Liege Hulett | Speaker of the Legislative Assembly of the Colony of Natal |
| 2 October 1902 | Willem van Hulsteyn | of Johannesburg |
| 24 October 1902 | John Charles Bell | Sheriff of the City of London |
| 24 October 1902 | Horace Brooks Marshall | Sheriff of the City of London |
| 24 October 1902 | William Allan, MP | |
| 24 October 1902 | Francis Cowley Burnand, BA | |
| 24 October 1902 | Caspar Purdon Clarke, FSA, FRIBA | Director of the Victoria and Albert Museum |
| 24 October 1902 | William Laird Clowes | |
| 24 October 1902 | William Job Collins, MD, FRCS | |
| 24 October 1902 | Alfred Cooper FRCS | |
| 24 October 1902 | John Halliday Croom | President of the Royal College of Surgeons of Edinburgh |
| 24 October 1902 | Arthur Conan Doyle, MD, DL | |
| 24 October 1902 | William Emerson | Past President of the Royal Institute of British Architects |
| 24 October 1902 | Col. Aubone George Fife | Standard Bearer of His Majesty's Bodyguard of the Honourable Corps of Gentlemen-at-Arms |
| 24 October 1902 | Joseph Thomas Firbank, MP | |
| 24 October 1902 | Thomas Richard Fraser, FRS, MD | President of the Royal College of Physicians of Edinburgh |
| 24 October 1902 | William Henry Holland, MP | |
| 24 October 1902 | Samuel Hall, KC | Vice-Chancellor of the County Palatine of Lancaster |
| 24 October 1902 | Col. Reginald Hennell | Lieutenant of the King's Bodyguard of Yeomen of the Guard |
| 24 October 1902 | Victor Alexander Haden Horsley, FRS, FRCS | |
| 24 October 1902 | Henry Greenway Howse | President of the Royal College of Surgeons |
| 24 October 1902 | Joseph Lawrence, MP | |
| 24 October 1902 | Ralph Daniel Makinson Littler, KC | |
| 24 October 1902 | George Thomas Livesey | |
| 24 October 1902 | Oliver Joseph Lodge, FRS | |
| 24 October 1902 | Henry Bell Longhurst | Honorary Surgeon Dentist to the King |
| 24 October 1902 | John Henry Luscombe | Chairman of Lloyds |
| 24 October 1902 | John McDougall | Chairman of the London County Council |
| 24 October 1902 | William MacEwen, FRS | |
| 24 October 1902 | William Mather, MP | |
| 24 October 1902 | Isambard Owen, MD | Senior Deputy Chancellor of the University of Wales |
| 24 October 1902 | Col. Horatio Gilbert George Parker, MP, DCL | |
| 24 October 1902 | Paynton Pigott, DL | Chief Constable of the County of Norfolk |
| 24 October 1902 | Arthur William Rücker, DSc, LLD | Principal of the University of London |
| 24 October 1902 | William Jameson Soulsby | |
| 24 October 1902 | Charles Villiers Stanford, MusDoc, DCL | |
| 24 October 1902 | Alfred Thomas, MP | |
| 24 October 1902 | John Isaac Thornycroft, LLD, FRS | |
| 24 October 1902 | Ernest Albert Waterlow, ARA | President of the Royal Society of Painters in Water Colours |
| 24 October 1902 | Joseph Loftus Wilkinson | General Manager of the Great Western Railway |
| 24 October 1902 | Guy Douglas Arthur Fleetwood Wilson | Assistant Under Secretary of State for War |
| 24 October 1902 | Charles Wyndham | |
| 24 October 1902 | Catchick Paul Chater | Member of the Executive and Legislative Council, Hong Kong |
| 9 November 1902 | John Elijah Blunt | Knighted on 16 April 1903 |
| 9 November 1902 | John Winthrop Hackett | Gazetted but declined the Knighthood |
| 1 December 1902 | James Percy FitzPatrick | of Johannesburg |
| 2 December 1902 | George Farrar | of the Transvaal |
| 4 December 1902 | Edward Fleet Alford | |
| 5 December 1902 | The Hon. William Arbuckle | President of the Legislative Council of the Colony of Natal |
| 6 December 1902 | Lewis Lloyd Michell | Member of the House of Assembly of the Colony of the Cape of Good Hope, and formerly Chairman of the Martial Law Board of the Colony of the Cape of Good Hope |
| 8 December 1902 | William Meigh Goodman | Chief Justice of the Supreme Court of the Colony of Hong Kong |
| 9 December 1902 | Henry Alleyne Bovell | Chief Justice of British Guiana |
| 10 December 1902 | The Hon. William Jukes Steward | Late Speaker of the House of Representatives of the Colony of New Zealand |
| 18 December 1902 | Thomas Robert Dewar, MP | |
| 18 December 1902 | Lt-Col. Charles John Owens | Engineer and Railway Volunteer Staff Corps |
| 18 December 1902 | Lt-Col. Charles Frederick Harrison | Engineer and Railway Volunteer Staff Corps |
| 18 December 1902 | Charles Hampden Wigram | |
| 18 December 1902 | Henry Hall Scott | |
| 18 December 1902 | Robert Hudson Borwick | |
| 18 December 1902 | Thomas Henry Brooke-Hitching | Sheriff of the City of London |
| 18 December 1902 | John Mowlem Burt | |
| 18 December 1902 | William Thomas Dupree | Mayor of Portsmouth |
| 18 December 1902 | Walter Gray | Formerly Mayor of Oxford |
| 18 December 1902 | Robert Mitton Hensley | Chairman of the Metropolitan Asylums Board |
| 18 December 1902 | John Hollams, JP, DL | |
| 18 December 1902 | James Hoy, LLD | Formerly Lord Mayor of Manchester |
| 18 December 1902 | Edward Letchworth, FSA | |
| 18 December 1902 | Col. John Roper Parkington, DL, JP | |
| 18 December 1902 | Col. Emil Hugo Oscar Robert Ropner, MP | |
| 18 December 1902 | John Sherburn | |
| 18 December 1902 | George Wyatt Truscott | Sheriff of the City of London |
| 18 December 1902 | Max Leonard Waechter | |
| 18 December 1902 | Charles John Follett | Solicitor of HM Customs |
| 18 December 1902 | Robert Rowand Anderson, LLD | |
| 18 December 1902 | William John Crump | |
| 18 December 1902 | Col. Edwin Hughes, VD | |
| 18 December 1902 | Henry Seton-Karr, MP | |
| 18 December 1902 | Col. James Gildea | |
| 23 December 1902 | Charles Bent Ball, MD | Regius Professor of Surgery in the University of Dublin |
