= List of knights bachelor appointed in 2004 =

Knight Bachelor is the oldest and lowest-ranking form of knighthood in the British honours system; it is the rank granted to a man who has been knighted by the monarch but not inducted as a member of one of the organised orders of chivalry. Women are not knighted; in practice, the equivalent award for a woman is appointment as Dame Commander of the Order of the British Empire (founded in 1917).

== Knights bachelor appointed in 2004 ==
Date	Name	Notes	Ref.
27 January 2004	The Honourable Mr Justice (Roderic Lionel James) Wood.		
10 February 2004	The Honourable Mr Justice (George Anthony) Mann.		
12 June 2004	David Charles Maurice Bell	Chair, Financial Times Group. For services to Business, the Arts and Charity in London.	
12 June 2004	Trevor David Brooking, CBE	Director of Football Development, English Football Association. For services to Sport.	
12 June 2004	Hugh Robert Collum	Chair, British Nuclear Fuels.For services to the Nuclear Industry.	
12 June 2004	Professor Alan William Craft	President, Royal College of Paediatrics and Professor of Child Health, University of Newcastle-upon-Tyne. For services to Medicine.	
12 June 2004	Professor Peter Robert Crane, FRS	Director, Royal Botanic Gardens, Kew. For services to Horticulture and Conservation.	
12 June 2004	Crispin Henry Lamert Davis	Chief Executive, Reed Elsevier. For services to the Information Industry.	
12 June 2004	Thomas Joseph Duggin	HM Ambassador, Bogota	
12 June 2004	Leslie Elton	Lately Chief Executive, Gateshead Metropolitan Borough Council. For services to Local Government	
~~12 June 2004~~	~~Frederick Anderson Goodwin~~ (knighthood annulled)	~~Group Chief Executive, Royal Bank of Scotland. For services to Banking~~	
12 June 2004	Professor Peter Stanley Harper, CBE	Lately Professor of Medical Genetics, University of Wales College of Medicine, Cardiff, and Consultant Clinical Geneticist and Physician. For services to Medicine	
12 June 2004	David George Henshaw	Chief Executive, Liverpool City Council. For services to Local Government	
12 June 2004	The Right Honourable Gerald Bernard Kaufman, MP	Member of Parliament for Manchester Gorton. For services to Parliament	
12 June 2004	John Anthony Lewis, OBE, Principal, Dixons City Technology College, Bradford. For services to Education.		
12 June 2004	Professor John Brian Pendry, FRS, Professor of Theoretical Solid State Physics, Imperial College, London. For services to Science.		
12 June 2004	Robert Weston Phillis, Chief Executive, Guardian Media Group. For services to the Media Industry.		
12 June 2004	Julian Michael Horn-Smith, Group Chief Operating Officer, Vodafone. For services to International Mobile Telecommunications.		
12 June 2004	Alan William Steer, Headteacher, Seven Kings High School, Redbridge, London. For services to Education.		
12 June 2004	Professor Nicholas Herbert Stern, lately Senior Vice-President and Chief Economist, World Bank and Professor of Economics, London School of Economics. For services to Economics.		
12 June 2004	Geoffrey Michael Montgomery Wakeford, OBE, Chairman, Governining Board of the Walsall City Academy (on behalf of The Mercers Company). For services to Education.		
12 June 2004	Professor David James Wallace, CBE, FRS, D.L. For services to UK Science, Technology and Engineering.		
12 June 2004	Willard Wentworth White, CBE, Singer. For services to Music.		
12 June 2004	Peter James Joseph Winship, CBE, QPM, HM Inspector of Constabulary. For services to the Police.		
12 June 2004	Dr Gregory Winter, C.B.E, FRS, Joint Head, Division of Protein and Nucleic Acid Chemistry, Medical Research Council Laboratory of Molecular Biology. For services to Molecular Biology.		
12 June 2004	Judge Richard George May, lately Judge at the International Criminal Tribunal for the former Yugoslavia.		
12 June 2004	Professor Isi Henao Kevau, CBE	For services to medical science and health care. (In the Papua New Guinea honours list)	
8 July 2004	The Honourable Mr Justice (Ernest Nigel) Ryder, TD.		
13 October 2004	The Honourable Mr Justice (Charles Declan) Morgan.		
10 November 2004	The Honourable Mr Justice (David Michael).		
30 November 2004	The Honourable Mr Justice (Alan Fraser).		
31 December 2004	Clive John Bourne, J.P. For services to Charity and to Education.		
31 December 2004	Professor Robert Rees Davies, CBE, lately Chicele Professor of Medieval History at the University of Oxford. For services to History.		
31 December 2004	Robert Gerard Finch, lately Lord Mayor of London. For services to the City of London.		
31 December 2004	Professor Andrew Paul Haines, dean of the London School of Hygiene and Tropical Medicine. For services to Medicine.		
31 December 2004	Professor Brian Howard Harrison, lately editor of the Oxford Dictionary of National Biography.		
31 December 2004	Alan Jeffrey Jones, chair of Toyota Motor Manufacturing (UK) Ltd. For services to the Automotive Industry.		
31 December 2004	Digby Marritt Jones, director-general of the Confederation of British Industry. For services to Business.		
31 December 2004	Roger Spencer Jones, OBE For services to Business and Training in Wales.		
31 December 2004	Robert Walker Kerslake, chief executive of Sheffield City Council. For services to Local Government.		
31 December 2004	Professor John Hartley Lawton, CBE, FRS, chief executive of the Natural Environment Research Council. For services to Ecological Science.		
31 December 2004	Dr. Jonathan Michael, chief executive of Guy's and St Thomas' NHS Foundation Trust. For services to the National Health Service.		
31 December 2004	Dr. Peter James Ogden, founder of the Ogden Trust. For services to Education.		
31 December 2004	Mervyn Kay Pedelty, lately chief executive of Co-operative Financial Services. For services to Business and to Charity.		
31 December 2004	Matthew Clive Pinsent, CBE, rower. For services to Sport.		
31 December 2004	Professor Desmond Rea, OBE, chair of the Northern Ireland Policing Board. For services to the Police.		
31 December 2004	Richard John Staite, OBE, headteacher of Beeslack Community High School, Penicuik, Midlothian. For services to Education.		
31 December 2004	Michael John Tomlinson, CBE, chair of the A-level Standards Inquiry, Working Group on 14–19 Reform and the Learning Trust for Hackney Schools. For services to Education.		
31 December 2004	Professor James Cressee Elphinstone Underwood, Professor of the Royal College of Pathologists and Professor of Pathology at the University of Sheffield. For services to Medicine.		
31 December 2004	David Veness, CBE, QPM, Assistant Commissioner of Police of the Metropolis. For services to the Police.		
31 December 2004	John Stuart Vickers, chair and chief executive of the Office of Fair Trading. For public service.		
31 December 2004	Derek Wanless. For public service.		
31 December 2004	Mark John Spurgeon Allen, CMG, counsellor at the Foreign and Commonwealth Office.		
31 December 2004	Professor Clive William John Granger. For services to Economics.		
31 December 2004	Professor Basil Spyridonos Markesinis, QC, FBA For services to international legal relations.		
31 December 2004	Professor Desmond Rea, OBE, Chair, Northern Ireland Policing Board. For services to the Police.		
31 December 2004	Lucas Joseph Waka, OBE	For services to politics. (In the Papua New Guinea honours list)	
31 December 2004	Thomas Kok Chan, OBE	For services to the social and economic development of the Solomon Islands. (In the Solomon Islands honours list)	
31 December 2004	Chief Justice Albert Rocky Palmer	On his appointment as Chief Justice. (In the Solomon Islands honours list)	
