= List of knights bachelor appointed in 2008 =

Knight Bachelor is the oldest and lowest-ranking form of knighthood in the British honours system; it is the rank granted to a man who has been knighted by the monarch but not inducted as a member of one of the organised orders of chivalry. Women are not knighted; in practice, the equivalent award for a woman is appointment as Dame Commander of the Order of the British Empire (founded in 1917).

== Knights bachelor appointed in 2008 ==
Date gazetted	Name	Notes	Ref.
12 February 2008	The Honourable Mr Justice (Nicholas Felix) Stadlen		
15 February 2008	The Honourable Mr Justice (Robert) Akenhead		
5 March 2008	The Honourable Mr Justice (David Robert) Foskett		
5 March 2008	The Honourable Mr Justice (Alastair Hubert) Norris		
20 May 2008	The Honourable Mr Justice (Nicholas John Gorrod) Blake		
21 May 2008	The Honourable Mr Justice (Gerald Edward) Barling		
21 May 2008	The Honourable Mr Justice (David George) Maddison		
29 May 2008	The Honourable Mr Justice (Peter David William) Coulson		
6 June 2008	The Honourable Mr Justice (Ross Frederick) Cranston		
13 June 2008	The Honourable Mr Justice (William James Lynton) Blair		
14 June 2008	Dr. James Iain Walker Anderson, CBE	For public and voluntary service.	
14 June 2008	William Samuel Atkinson	Headteacher, Phoenix High School, Hammersmith and Fulham, London. For services to Education and to Community Relations.	
14 June 2008	The Right Honourable Alan James Beith, MP	Member of Parliament for Berwick-upon-Tweed. For services to Parliament.	
14 June 2008	Professor James Drummond Bone, FRSE	Vice-Chancellor, University of Liverpool. For services to Higher Education and to Regeneration in the North West.	
14 June 2008	Professor Christopher Richard Watkin Edwards	For services to Higher Education, Medical Science and to Regeneration in the North East.	
14 June 2008	Mark Philip Elder, CBE	Conductor and music director, Halle´ Orchestra. For services to Music.	
14 June 2008	Leonard Raymond Fenwick, CBE	Chief Executive, Newcastle upon Tyne Hospitals NHS Foundation Trust. For services to Healthcare and to the community in Tyne and Wear.	
14 June 2008	Dr. Philip John Hunter, CBE	Chief Schools Adjudicator. For services to Education.	
14 June 2008	Moir Lockhead, OBE	Chief Executive, First Group. For services to Transport.	
14 June 2008	Professor Andrew James McMichael, FRS	Professor of Molecular Medicine and Director, Weatherall Institute of Molecular Medicine, University of Oxford. For services to Medical Science.	
14 June 2008	William Moorcroft	Principal, Trafford College. For services to local and national Further Education.	
14 June 2008	William Desmond Sargent, CBE	Executive Chair, Better Regulation Executive, Department for Business, Enterprise and Regulatory Reform. For services to Business.	
14 June 2008	Michael John Snyder	For services to Business and to the City of London Corporation.	
14 June 2008	Paul Robert Stephenson, MBE	Deputy Commissioner, Metropolitan Police Service. For services to the Police.	
14 June 2008	Professor Anthony John Newman Taylor, CBE	Lately Chair, Industrial Injuries Advisory Council. For public service.	
14 June 2008	Peter John Viggers, MP	Member of Parliament for Gosport. For services to Parliament.	
14 June 2008	Professor Nicholas John Wald	Professor of Environmental and Preventive Medicine, Wolfson Institute of Preventive Medicine, Queen Mary, University of London. For services to Preventive Medicine.	
14 June 2008	Dr. Richard John Roberts	For services to molecular biology and UK science, USA.	
14 June 2008	Koitaga Mano, MBE	For services to Western Highlands, particularly the Mount Giluwe community. (In the Papua New Guinea honours list)	
9 July 2008	The Honourable Mr Justice (Christopher David) Floyd.		
24 July 2008	The Honourable Mr Justice (Richard Owen) Plender.		
28 October 2008	The Honourable Mr Justice (Ian Duncan) Burnett.		
19 November 2008	The Honourable Mr Justice (Alistair Geoffrey) MacDuff.		
25 November 2008	The Honourable Mr Justice (Nigel Hamilton) Sweeney.		
31 December 2008	Professor Timothy Robert Peter Brighouse	For services to Education.	
31 December 2008	Professor David Nicholas Cannadine	Lately of Queen Elizabeth The Queen Mother Professor, Institute of Historical Research, University of London. For services to Scholarship.	
31 December 2008	Alexander Crombie	Group Chief Executive, Standard Life. For services to the Insurance Industry in Scotland.	
31 December 2008	Dr. Andrew Cubie, CBE	Lately Chair of the Court, Napier University. For public service in Scotland.	
31 December 2008	Peter John Bellett Dixon	Lately Chairman, Housing Corporation. For services to the Housing Sector.	
31 December 2008	Professor Neil James Douglas, President, Royal College of Physicians of Edinburgh.	For services to Medicine.	
31 December 2008	Robert Paul Edwards, Headteacher, Garforth Community College, Leeds.	For services to local and national Education.	
31 December 2008	Christopher Andrew Hoy, MBE, Cyclist.	For services to Sport.	
31 December 2008	David Charles Jones, CBE	For services to Business and to Charity.	
31 December 2008	Kenneth Lloyd Jones, MBE, Chief Constable and President, Association of Chief Police Officers.	For services to the Police.	
31 December 2008	Nigel Graham Knowles, Chief Executive and Managing Partner for Europe and Asia, DLA Piper International LLP.	For services to the Legal Profession.	
31 December 2008	David Thomas Rowell Lewis.	For services to the Legal Profession and to the City of London Corporation.	
31 December 2008	John Robert Madejski, OBE	For charitable services.	
31 December 2008	Neil Stuart McKay, C.B., Chief Executive, East of England Strategic Health Authority.	For services to the NHS.	
31 December 2008	His Honour Judge Goolam Hoosen Kader Meeran, lately President, Employment Tribunal (England and Wales).	For services to the Administration of Justice.	
31 December 2008	Nicholas Wyndham Partridge, OBE, Chief Executive, Terrence Higgins Trust.	For services to Healthcare.	
31 December 2008	John Christopher Powell, chairman, National Endowment for Science, Technology and the Arts.	For services to the Advertising Industry.	
31 December 2008	Terence David John Pratchett, OBE, Author.	For services to Literature.	
31 December 2008	Bernard Francisco Ribeiro, CBE, lately President, Royal College of Surgeons.	For services to Medicine.	
31 December 2008	Professor Martin John Taylor, FRS, Professor in Pure Mathematics, University of Manchester.	For services to Science.	
31 December 2008	Dr. Mark Jeremy Walport, Director, Wellcome Trust.	For services to Medical Research.	
31 December 2008	Professor Christopher John Greenwood, C.M.G., Professor of International Law, London School of Economics.	For services to public International Law.	
