= List of knights bachelor appointed in 2006 =

Knight Bachelor is the oldest and lowest-ranking form of knighthood in the British honours system; it is the rank granted to a man who has been knighted by the monarch but not inducted as a member of one of the organised orders of chivalry. Women are not knighted; in practice, the equivalent award for a woman is appointment as Dame Commander of the Order of the British Empire (founded in 1917).

== Knights bachelor appointed in 2006 ==
| Date gazetted | Name | Notes | Ref. |
|---|---|---|---|
| 14 February 2006 | The Honourable Mr Justice (David) Lloyd Jones | | |
| 28 February 2006 | The Honourable Mr Justice (Charles Peter Lawford) Openshaw | | |
| 9 March 2006 | The Honourable Mr Justice (David James Tyson) Kitchin | | |
| 28 March 2006 | The Honourable Mr Justice (Vivian Arthur) Ramsey | | |
| 16 May 2006 | The Honourable Mr Justice (Nicholas Edward) Underhill | | |
| 14 June 2006 | The Honourable Mr Justice (Stephen John) Irwin | | |
| 17 June 2006 | Michael John Aaronson, CBE | Lately Director-General, Save the Children. For services to Children. | |
| 17 June 2006 | Professor Roy Malcolm Anderson | Chief Scientific Adviser, Ministry of Defence. | |
| 17 June 2006 | Jonathan Elliott Asbridge | President, Nursing and Midwifery Council. For services to the NHS and Nursing. | |
| 17 June 2006 | Norman George Bettison, QPM | Chief Executive, Centrex and lately Chief Constable, Merseyside Police. For services to the Police. | |
| 17 June 2006 | James Robert Crosby | Chief Executive, HBOS plc. For services to the Finance Industry. | |
| 17 June 2006 | Donald Gordon Cruickshank | For public service. | |
| 17 June 2006 | Professor Barrington Windsor Cunliffe, CBE | Professor of European Archaeology, University of Oxford. For services to Archaeology. | |
| 17 June 2006 | Professor Albert Aynsley-Green | Children's Commissioner for England. For services to Children and Young People. | |
| 17 June 2006 | Philip Green | Retail Executive. For services to the Retail Industry. | |
| 17 June 2006 | Mark Grundy | Headteacher, Shireland Language College, Smethwick, Sandwell, West Midlands. For services to Education and to ICT. | |
| 17 June 2006 | Dr. Richard Timothy Hunt | Principal Scientist, Cancer Research UK. For services to Science. | |
| 17 June 2006 | Stelios Haji-Ioannou | For services to Entrepreneurship. | |
| 17 June 2006 | Brian Gammell Ivory, CBE | Chair, Board of Trustees, National Galleries of Scotland. For services to the Arts. | |
| 17 June 2006 | Kenneth John Knight, CBE, QFSM | Commissioner, London Fire Brigade. For services to the Fire and Rescue Service. | |
| 17 June 2006 | Councillor Richard Charles Leese, CBE | Leader, Manchester City Council. For services to Local Government. | |
| 17 June 2006 | Robert John Margetts, CBE | Chair, Natural Environment Research Council. For services to Science and to Business. | |
| 17 June 2006 | David Michael Charles Michels, lately Chief Executive, Hilton Group plc. For services to the Hospitality Industry. | | |
| 17 June 2006 | David Gerald Richards, Chair, Football Association Premier League and Football Foundation. For services to Sport. | | |
| 17 June 2006 | Dr. Peter Jeffery Simpson, President, Royal College of Anaesthetists. For services to the NHS. | | |
| 17 June 2006 | John Michael Sunderland, Chair, Cadbury Schweppes and President, Confederation of British Industry. For services to Business. | | |
| 17 June 2006 | Gilbert Stanley Thomas, OBE. For services to Business and to Charity in Wales. | | |
| 17 June 2006 | Charles Cornelius Wheeler, CMG. For services to Broadcasting and to Journalism. | | |
| 17 June 2006 | Professor Roger Williams, Chair, Higher Education Funding Council for Wales. For services to Higher Education. | | |
| 17 June 2006 | The Honourable Mr. Justice Lisle Austin Ward, QC, lately Chief Justice of the Supreme Court, Bermuda. | | |
| 17 June 2006 | Roger Keith Cunningham, CBE | For services to commerce and industry. (In the Papua New Guinea honours list) | |
| 17 June 2006 | Graeme Ian Whitchurch, OBE | For public service. (In the Papua New Guinea honours list) | |
| 19 July 2006 | The Honourable Mr Justice (Michael Townley Featherstone) Briggs. | | |
| 30 December 2006 | Keith Onyema Ajegbo, O.B.E., lately Headteacher, Deptford Green School, Lewisham, London. For services to Education. | | |
| 30 December 2006 | Ian Charles Franklin Andrews, C.B.E., T.D., Second Permanent Under-Secretary of State, Ministry of Defence. | | |
| 30 December 2006 | Geoffrey Lionel Bindman. For services to Human Rights. | | |
| 30 December 2006 | Dr. John Richard Grenfell Bradfield, C.B.E. For services to Science, Business and to the community in Cambridge. | | |
| 30 December 2006 | Alderman David William Brewer, C.M.G., J.P., lately Lord Mayor of London. For services to the City of London. | | |
| 30 December 2006 | Robert William Kenneth Crawford, C.B.E., Director-General, Imperial War Museum. For services to Museums. | | |
| 30 December 2006 | Professor Howard Dalton, Chief Scientific Adviser, Department for Environment, Food and Rural Affairs and Professor in the Department of Biological Sciences, University of Warwick. | | |
| 30 December 2006 | Professor Gordon William Duff, Professor of Molecular Medicine, Director of Molecular and Genetic Medicine and Medical Research Dean, Sheffield University. For services to Public Health. | | |
| 30 December 2006 | James Dyson, C.B.E., Founder and Chair, Dyson Ltd. For services to Business. | | |
| 30 December 2006 | Professor Malcolm Green, lately Vice-Principal, Faculty of Medicine, Imperial College and Head, National Heart and Lung Institute. For services to Medicine. | | |
| 30 December 2006 | Philip Roy Hampton, Chair, J Sainsbury plc. For public service. | | |
| 30 December 2006 | Michael De Courcy Fraser Holroyd, C.B.E., Writer. For services to Literature. | | |
| 30 December 2006 | Kenneth Donald John Macdonald, Q.C., director of public prosecutions and head of Crown Prosecution Service. | | |
| 30 December 2006 | Herbert William Massie, C.B.E., Chair, Disability Rights Commission. For services to Disabled People. | | |
| 30 December 2006 | David Edward Murray, Chair, Murray International Holdings Ltd. For services to Business in Scotland. | | |
| 30 December 2006 | Professor John James O’Reilly, lately Chief Executive, Engineering and Physical Sciences Research Council. For services to Science. | | |
| 30 December 2006 | His Honour Stephen John Lindsay Oliver, Q.C., Presiding Special Commissioner and President, VAT and Duties Tribunals; President, Financial Services and Markets Tribunal. For public service. | | |
| 30 December 2006 | Michael Derek Vaughan Rake, Chair, KPMG International. For services to the Accountancy Profession. | | |
| 30 December 2006 | Professor George Peter Scott, Vice-Chancellor, Kingston University. For services to Higher Education. | | |
| 30 December 2006 | George Albert Shearing, O.B.E., Jazz Pianist and Composer. For services to Music. | | |
| 30 December 2006 | Kevin Smith, C.B.E., Chief Executive, GKN plc. For services to Industry. | | |
| 30 December 2006 | Professor John Edward Tooke, Dean, Peninsula Medical School, Honorary Consultant Physician, Royal Devon and Exeter NHS Foundation Trust. For services to Medicine | | |
| 30 December 2006 | George Desmond Lorenz De Silva, Q.C., lately The Prosecutor to the Special Court for Sierra Leone. | | |
| 30 December 2006 | Geoffrey Nice, Q.C. For services to international criminal justice in and for the former Yugoslavia. | | |
| 30 December 2006 | Professor James Fraser Stoddart. For services to chemistry and molecular nanotechnology. | | |
