= List of knights bachelor appointed in 1910 =

Knight Bachelor is the oldest and lowest-ranking form of knighthood in the British honours system; it is the rank granted to a man who has been knighted by the monarch but not inducted as a member of one of the organised orders of chivalry. Women are not knighted; in practice, the equivalent award for a woman is appointment as Dame Commander of the Order of the British Empire (founded in 1917).

== Knights bachelor appointed in 1910 ==
Date	Name	Notes	Ref
1 January 1910	Narayan Ganesh Chandavarkar	Puisne Judge of the High Court of Judicature, Bombay	
1 January 1910	Alexander McRobert		
1 January 1910	Dorabji Jamsetjee Tata		
1 January 1910	Robert Smith Aikman	late Puisne Judge of the High Court of Judicature, North West Provinces	
23 February 1910	Robert Carr Selfe		
23 February 1910	Robert Kyffin Thomas		
16 March 1910	Hormusjee Nowrojee Mody		
17 March 1910	Rufus Daniel Isaacs, KC	Solicitor-General	
21 June 1910	Thomas Edward Scrutton	Justice of the High Court of Justice	
7 July 1910	Robert Andrew Allison		
7 July 1910	Augustus Montague Bradley		
7 July 1910	George Jack Cockburn		
7 July 1910	Arthur Thomas Quiller Couch		
7 July 1910	Robert Ellis Cunliffe	Solicitor to the Board of Trade	
7 July 1910	Charles Henry Davis	lately Solicitor to the Public Works Loans Board	
7 July 1910	Arthur Henry Downes, MD	Senior Medical Inspector for Poor Law Purposes to the Local Government Board	
7 July 1910	Alfred East, ARA		
7 July 1910	John Fagan, FRCSI		
7 July 1910	John Forsey	Director of Naval Stores	
7 July 1910	Col. George Malcolm Fox		
7 July 1910	Phillip James Hamilton-Grierson	Solicitor, Inland Revenue Department, Edinburgh	
7 July 1910	Edward Hain		
7 July 1910	Henry Hall	lately one of His Majesty's Inspectors of Mines	
7 July 1910	George Hastings, MD		
7 July 1910	Alfred Hopkinson, KC, LLD		
7 July 1910	Clarendon Hyde		
7 July 1910	Col. Robert William Inglis		
7 July 1910	Alfred Macdonald Bulteel Irwin, CSI	lately a Judge of the Chief Court of Lower Burma	
7 July 1910	Benjamin Sands Johnson		
7 July 1910	John Lentaigne	President of the Royal College of Surgeons, Ireland	
7 July 1910	James Long	Chairman of the Cork Harbour Commission	
7 July 1910	Henry Simpson Lunn, MD		
7 July 1910	George Watson MacAlpine		
7 July 1910	David Caldwell McVail, MB		
7 July 1910	Albert Meldon		
7 July 1910	James Edward Parrott, LLD		
7 July 1910	William Robertson		
7 July 1910	Robert Michael Simon, MD		
7 July 1910	Alexander Rose Stenning		
7 July 1910	Maj. Thomas Bilbe Robinson	Agent-General in London for Queensland	
7 July 1910	Henry Cooper Eggar, MVO		
7 July 1910	George Ritchie		
7 July 1910	The Hon. Charles Christopher Bowen	Speaker of the Legislative Council of the Dominion of New Zealand	
7 July 1910	The Hon. George William Ross	Member of the Senate of the Dominion of Canada	
7 July 1910	William Henry Beaumont	late Puisne Judge of the Supreme Court of Natal	
7 July 1910	Byron Edmund Walker, CVO	President of the Canadian Bank of Commerce	
7 July 1910	Henry Newell Bate	Chairman of the Ottawa Improvement Commission	
7 July 1910	Frederick William Smith	Mayor of the City of Cape Town	
7 July 1910	Thomas Major Cullinan	lately Member of the Legislative Assembly of the Transvaal, Chairman and Managing Director of the Premier Diamond Mining Company Limited	
7 July 1910	Surgeon-Lt-Col. Warren Roland Crooke-Lawless, CIE, MD	of the Coldstream Guards; Surgeon to the Viceroy of India	
7 July 1910	Chinubhai Madhavlal, CIE		
12 October 1910	John Eldon Bankes	Justice of the High Court of Justice	
12 October 1910	Horace Edmund Avory	Justice of the High Court of Justice	
12 October 1910	Thomas Gardner Horridge	Justice of the High Court of Justice	
12 October 1910	Charles Montague Lush	Justice of the High Court of Justice	
26 October 1910	John Allsebrook Simon, KC	Solicitor-General	
21 November 1910	Joseph Vintcent Jnr., LLB	Senior Judge of the High Court of Southern Rhodesia and Judge of the High Court of North-Western Rhodesia. Appointed by Field Marshal His Royal Highness the Duke of Connaught and Strathearn during his visit to Southern Rhodesia.	
21 November 1910	Charles Patrick John Coghlan	Member of the Legislative Council of Southern Rhodesia. Appointed by Field Marshal His Royal Highness the Duke of Connaught and Strathearn during his visit to Southern Rhodesia.	
