= List of knights bachelor appointed in 1917 =

Knight Bachelor is the oldest and lowest-ranking form of knighthood in the British honours system; it is the rank granted to a man who has been knighted by the monarch but not inducted as a member of one of the organised orders of chivalry. Women are not knighted; in practice, the equivalent award for a woman is appointment as Dame Commander of the Order of the British Empire (founded in 1917).

== Knights bachelor appointed in 1917 ==
Date	Name	Notes	Ref
21 February 1917	William Frederick Alphonse Archibald		
21 February 1917	Robert Armstrong-Jones, MD	(Major, Royal Army Medical Corps)	
21 February 1917	Archibald Henry Bodkin		
21 February 1917	Walter MacGeough Bond		
21 February 1917	Joseph Guinness Broodbank		
21 February 1917	George T. Buckham		
21 February 1917	Arthur Carkeek		
21 February 1917	Julian Corbett		
21 February 1917	Leonard Dunning	Inspector of Constabulary	
21 February 1917	Hugh Fraser, LLD		
21 February 1917	Harry Edwin Haward		
21 February 1917	The Very Rev. John Herkless, DD		
21 February 1917	Henry Holloway		
21 February 1917	James Hope-Simpson		
21 February 1917	Christopher Nicholson Johnston, KC		
21 February 1917	Prof. Richard Lodge		
21 February 1917	William Lorimer		
21 February 1917	John Lonsdale Otter		
21 February 1917	Edward Ernest Pearson		
21 February 1917	Keith William Price		
21 February 1917	Vincent Litchfield Raven		
21 February 1917	Harry Ross Skinner		
21 February 1917	Samuel George Shead	(Temporary Second Lieutenant, Army Service Corps)	
21 February 1917	Edward Smith		
21 February 1917	Evan Spicer		
21 February 1917	Lt-Col. Owen Thomas		
21 February 1917	George Alexander Touche, MP		
21 February 1917	William Ashbee Tritton		
21 February 1917	Daniel Harold Ryan Twomey	Indian Civil Service, Judge, Chief Court of Lower Burma	
21 February 1917	George Vanston		
21 February 1917	William Weir		
21 February 1917	Ernest Michael Clarke	Director, Motor Ambulance Department, British Red Cross Society	
21 February 1917	James Gallagher	late Lord Mayor of Dublin	
21 February 1917	Prof. Paul Vinogradoff		
21 February 1917	The Hon. Walter Gibson Pringle Cassels	Senior Judge of the Exchequer Court of Canada	
21 February 1917	Mortimer Barnett Davis		
21 February 1917	Charles Simon Davson	Chief Justice of Fiji and Chief Judicial Commissioner of the Western Pacific	
21 February 1917	The Hon. John Edward Denniston	a Judge of the Supreme Court of the Dominion of New Zealand	
21 February 1917	Thomas Allwright Dibbs		
21 February 1917	Robert Randolph Garran, CMG	Solicitor-General, Commonwealth of Australia	
21 February 1917	John Grice		
21 February 1917	Ambalawanar Kanagasabai		
21 February 1917	The Hon. John Gilbert Kotze	Puisne Judge, Cape Provincial Division, Supreme Court of South Africa	
21 February 1917	The Hon. Ezekiel McLeod	Chief Justice of the Supreme Court of New Brunswick	
21 February 1917	Daniel Thomas Tudor	Chief Justice of the Supreme Court of the Bahama Islands	
21 February 1917	Reginald Arthur Gamble	Indian Civil Service, Comptroller and Auditor-General, an Additional Member of the Indian Legislative Council	
21 February 1917	Archibald Birkmyre	an Additional Member of the Legislative Council of the Governor of Bengal	
21 February 1917	Sundar Lal, CIE, DLL, Rai Bahadur	An Additional Member of the Legislative Council of the Lieutenant-Governor of the United Provinces of Agra and Oudh	
21 February 1917	Jagadish Chandra Bose, CSI, CIE, DSc	Formerly of the Indian Educational Service	
21 February 1917	Norcot Hastings Yeeles Warren	Secretary and Treasurer of the Bank of Bengal, Calcutta	
21 February 1917	Naoroji Pestanji Vakil, CIE, Khan. Bahadur		
21 February 1917	Duncan Carmichael		
13 June 1917	William James Ashley	Dean of the Faculty of Commerce at Birmingham	
13 June 1917	John Audley Frederick Aspinall	General Manager of the Lancashire and Yorkshire Railway	
13 June 1917	Graham Balfour	Secretary to the Staffordshire Education Committee	
13 June 1917	Francis Henry Barker		
13 June 1917	Rowland Barran, MP		
13 June 1917	William Barton, MP		
13 June 1917	William Cain		
13 June 1917	Frederick William Alfred Clarke	Accountant and Comptroller-General of Customs and Excise	
13 June 1917	Arthur Stockdale Cope, RA		
13 June 1917	William Henry Cowan, MP		
13 June 1917	Col. Thomas Kennedy Dalziel	RAMC	
13 June 1917	Henry Davies, CB	Controller of the Post Office Savings Bank	
13 June 1917	George Samuel Elliott, JP		
13 June 1917	Thomas Gregory Foster	Provost of University College, London	
13 June 1917	John Foster Fraser, FRGS, FZS		
13 June 1917	Richard Tetley Glazebrook, CB, FRS	Director of the National Physical Laboratory	
13 June 1917	Robert Graham, DL, JP		
13 June 1917	Henry Herbert Hambling		
13 June 1917	George Haysom	Sheriff of the City of London	
13 June 1917	Thomas Erskine Holland, KC, DCL, LLD		
13 June 1917	Lt-Col. William Henry Houghton-Gastrell, MP		
13 June 1917	Robert Murray Hyslop		
13 June 1917	Lt-Col. Robert Jones, CB, FRCS	Lecturer on Orthopaedic Surgery at Liverpool University	
13 June 1917	John Lome McLeod	Lord Provost of Edinburgh	
13 June 1917	Alexander Herbert Maguire		
13 June 1917	Charles Edward Mallet		
13 June 1917	Edward Marshall-Hall, KC, MP	Recorder of Guildford	
13 June 1917	Ernest Martin		
13 June 1917	Grimwood Mears		
13 June 1917	Maj. Lewis Arthur Newton	Sheriff of the City of London	
13 June 1917	Henry George Norris	Mayor of Fulham	
13 June 1917	Ebenezer Parkes, MP		
13 June 1917	William Peck, FRSE, FRAS	Director of the City Observatory, Calton Hill, Edinburgh	
13 June 1917	Robert Leonard Powell, JP		
13 June 1917	William Beddoe Rees		
13 June 1917	Alfred Farthing Robbins		
13 June 1917	Samuel Roberts, MP		
13 June 1917	Charles Walter Starmer, JP		
13 June 1917	Dudley Stewart-Smith, KC	Vice-Chancellor of the County Palatine of Lancaster	
13 June 1917	William Hamo Thornycroft, RA		
13 June 1917	Herbert Furnival Waterhouse, MD, FRCS	Member of Council and Court of Examiners of the Royal College of Surgeons	
13 June 1917	William Watson, LLD		
13 June 1917	Edward Graham Wood	High Sheriff of Lancashire	
13 June 1917	John Aird	Aird was unable to attend his investiture; if he was ever dubbed, the event was not gazetted.	
13 June 1917	George Burn	Burn was unable to attend his investiture; if he was ever dubbed, the event was not gazetted.	
13 June 1917	George Bury	Bury was unable to attend his investiture; if he was ever dubbed, the event was not gazetted.	
13 June 1917	Eugene Fiset, CMG, DSO, MD	Surgeon-General, Canadian Militia, Deputy Minister of Militia and Defence, of the Dominion of Canada	
13 June 1917	Ellis Kadoorie		
13 June 1917	The Hon. Johannes Henricus Lange, LLB	Puisne Judge, Griqualand West Local Division, Cape of Good Hope Provisional Division of the Supreme Court of South Africa	
13 June 1917	The Hon. Edward Miller	Treasurer for the Australian Branch of the British Red Cross Society	
13 June 1917	Augustus Meredith Nanton		
13 June 1917	James Patrick Sands	President of the Legislative Council of the Bahama Islands	
13 June 1917	Edward Charles Stirling, CMG, MD, DSc	Professor of Physiology in the University of Adelaide	
13 June 1917	Frank Clement Offley Beaman		
13 June 1917	Ashutosh Chaudhuri		
13 June 1917	Dinshah Fdalji Vachha		
13 June 1917	Edward Hugh Bray		
13 June 1917	Henry John Stanyon, CIE, VD		
13 June 1917	Michael Nethersole, CSI		
2 November 1917	Arthur Clavell Salter	Justice of the High Court of Justice	
2 November 1917	Alexander Adair Roche	Justice of the High Court of Justice	

== Notes ==
It was announced in the 1917 New Year Honours that a knighthood was to be bestowed on William Gundry, JP (a magistrate for Middlesex, the president of the Enfield Liberal Association and a director of Messrs Morris, Ashby Ltd, a firm of city merchants), but he died before he received the accolade. By a royal warrant dated 9 January 1918, George V declared that his widow, Florence Eugenie Barwell Gundry, "shall have, hold and enjoy the style, title, place and precedence to which she would have been entitled had her husband survived to receive the honour of Knight Bachelor at the hands of His Majesty".
