= List of knights bachelor appointed in 1915 =

Knight Bachelor is the oldest and lowest-ranking form of knighthood in the British honours system; it is the rank granted to a man who has been knighted by the monarch but not inducted as a member of one of the organised orders of chivalry. Women are not knighted; in practice, the equivalent award for a woman is appointment as Dame Commander of the Order of the British Empire (founded in 1917).

== Knights bachelor appointed in 1915 ==
Date	Name	Notes	Ref
1 January 1915	Horatio Brevitt	Town Clerk of Wolverhampton	
1 January 1915	William Carey	Bailiff of Guernsey	
1 January 1915	Arthur Wakefield Chapman	Chairman of the Surrey County Council	
1 January 1915	John Cowan		
1 January 1915	James Johnston Dobbie, FRS, DSc	Principal of the Government Laboratories	
1 January 1915	Frank Watson Dyson, FRS	Astronomer Royal	
1 January 1915	Alfred Lassam Goodson		
1 January 1915	Thomas Duncombe Mann	Clerk to the Metropolitan Asylums Board	
1 January 1915	Perceval Alleyn Nairne	Chairman of the Committee of the London School of Tropical Medicine	
1 January 1915	Henry John Newbolt, DLitt		
1 January 1915	Douglas William Owen		
1 January 1915	Lt-Col. Stephen Penfold	Mayor of Folkestone	
1 January 1915	Walter Trower		
1 January 1915	Henry Urwick		
1 January 1915	Herbert Ashcombe Walker	General Manager of the London and South Western Railway	
1 January 1915	Alfred William Watson		
1 January 1915	John Gibson		
1 January 1915	James Thomson Broom	Chairman of the Ceylon Chamber of Commerce	
1 January 1915	William Kellman Chandler, CMG, LLD	Master in Chancery and Judge of the Assistant Court of Appeal, Barbados	
1 January 1915	The Rt Hon. David Valentine Hennessy	Lord Mayor of the City of Melbourne	
1 January 1915	Herbert Samuel Holt		
1 January 1915	The Hon. François Xavier Lemieux	Acting Chief Justice of the Superior Court of the Province of Quebec, in the Dominion of Canada	
1 January 1915	Herbert Lethington Maitland, MB, ChM		
1 January 1915	Capt Clive Oldnall Long Phillipps-Wolley		
1 January 1915	William Price		
1 January 1915	James Glenny Wilson	President of the Board of Agriculture in the Dominion of New Zealand	
1 January 1915	Joseph John Heaton	Indian Civil Service; a Puisne Judge of the High Court of Judicature in Bombay	
1 January 1915	George Cunningham Buchanan, CIE	Chairman and Chief Engineer of the Commissioners for the Port of Rangoon, Burma	
1 January 1915	Donald Campbell Johnstone	Indian Civil Service; Judge of the Chief Court of the Punjab	
1 January 1915	Loraine Geddes Dunbar	Secretary and Treasurer of the Bank of Bengal, Calcutta	
1 January 1915	John Hubert Marshall, CIE	Director-General of Archaeology in India	
1 January 1915	Satyendra Prasanna Sinha	Barrister-at-Law; a Member of the Legislative Council of the Governor of Bengal	
1 January 1915	Robert Stewart Johnstone	lately Chief Justice of Grenada	
13 February 1915	Edward O'Farrell, CB	Assistant Under Secretary to the Lord Lieutenant of Ireland	
13 February 1915	Alfred Callaghan, LLD		
13 February 1915	William Fry		
13 February 1915	John Irwin		
9 June 1915	The Rt Hon. Frederick Edwin Smith, KC	Solicitor-General	
18 June 1915	Henry Doran	Member of the Congested Districts Board for Ireland	
18 June 1915	Hon. Cdr Edward Lionel Fletcher, RNR		
18 June 1915	Lt-Col. William Forbes	Commandant, Engineer and Railway Staff Corps, General Manager of the London, Brighton and South Coast Railway	
18 June 1915	Charles Edward Fryer, ISO	Superintending Inspector of Fisheries, Board of Agriculture	
18 June 1915	Joseph Aloysius Glynn	Chairman, National Health Insurance Commission (Ireland)	
18 June 1915	Henry Ledgard		
18 June 1915	John Lindsay		
18 June 1915	James Mackenzie, MD, FRS, FRCP, LLD		
18 June 1915	John Henry Maden	High Sheriff of Lancashire	
18 June 1915	The Hon. Peter McBride	Agent-General in London for the State of Victoria	
18 June 1915	Leo George Chiozza Money, MP		
18 June 1915	Ruthven Grey Monteath		
18 June 1915	Frederick Needham, MD	Commissioner, Board of Control	
18 June 1915	Walter Palmer Nevill		
18 June 1915	Erik Olof Ohlson		
18 June 1915	William Pearce, MP		
18 June 1915	Edward Rigg, CB, ISO	Superintendent, Operative Department, Royal Mint	
18 June 1915	Edward George Saltmarsh		
18 June 1915	William Napier Shaw, FRS	Director of the Meteorological Office	
18 June 1915	William Capel Slaughter		
18 June 1915	William SIingo	Engineer-in-Chief, General Post Office	
18 June 1915	Charles Stewart Loch		
18 June 1915	Herbert Brown Ames	Member of the House of Commons of Canada; Honorary Secrctary of the Canadian Patriotic Fund	
18 June 1915	The Hon. Edgar Rennie Bowring	Member of the Legislative Council of Newfoundland	
18 June 1915	Henry Lumley Drayton, KC	Chief Commissioner, Board of Railway Commissioners for Canada	
18 June 1915	John Craig Eaton		
18 June 1915	Charles Frederick Fraser, LLD	Superintendent of the School for the Blind, Halifax, Canada	
18 June 1915	Robert Ho Tung		
18 June 1915	The Hon. Thomas Hughes	Member of the Legislative Council of the State of New South Wales	
18 June 1915	Thomas Muir, CMG, LLD, MA	Superintendent-General of Education. Province of the Cape of Good Hope, Union of South Africa	
18 June 1915	Alexander Wood Renton	the Chief Justice of the Island of Ceylon	
18 June 1915	Rash Behari Ghose, CSI, CIE		
18 June 1915	John George Woodroffe	a Puisne Judge of the High Court of Judicature at Fort William, in Bengal	
18 June 1915	Rabindranath Tagore		
18 June 1915	Robert Richard Gales	Indian Public Works Department	
18 June 1915	Haji Muhammad Yusuf		
18 June 1915	James Murray		
5 August 1915	Lancelot Sanderson, KC, MP	On his appointment as Chief Justice of the High Court of Judicature, Calcutta	
2 December 1915	The Rt Hon. George Cave, KC	Solicitor-General	
2 December 1915	Arthur Frederic Peterson	Justice of the High Court of Justice	
