= List of knights bachelor appointed in 1908 =

Knight Bachelor is the oldest and lowest-ranking form of knighthood in the British honours system; it is the rank granted to a man who has been knighted by the monarch but not inducted as a member of one of the organised orders of chivalry. Women are not knighted; in practice, the equivalent award for a woman is appointment as Dame Commander of the Order of the British Empire (founded in 1917).

== Knights bachelor appointed in 1908 ==
Date	Name	Notes	Ref
14 January 1908	Charles George Hillersden Allen	Indian Civil Service; Chairman of the Corporation of Calcutta	
17 February 1908	Samuel Thomas Evans, KC, MP	Solicitor-General	
26 June 1908	Horatio Hale Shephard	Formerly Legal Adviser to the Secretary of State for India	
26 June 1908	Arthur Guillum Scott	Formerly Accountant-General to the India Office	
26 June 1908	John Roche Dasent, CB	Of the Board of Education	
26 June 1908	Colonel David Bruce, CB, RAMC		
26 June 1908	Major Edward Gilbert Clayton, CB		
26 June 1908	William Dawkins Cramp, ISO		
26 June 1908	Colonel Charles Allen		
26 June 1908	Frederic Bolton		
26 June 1908	Percy William Bunting		
26 June 1908	Robert William Burnet, MD		
26 June 1908	David Burnett	Alderman and Sheriff of the city of London	
26 June 1908	Joseph Joel Duveen		
26 June 1908	John Fleming, LLD	Lord Provost of Aberdeen	
26 June 1908	Edward Henry Fraser, DCL		
26 June 1908	Evelyn Freeth	Secretary, Estate Duty Office	
26 June 1908	Professor Alfred George Greenhill, FRS	Ordnance College, Woolwich	
26 June 1908	Robert Abbott Hadfield		
26 June 1908	William Pickles Hartley		
26 June 1908	John Hay, LLD		
26 June 1908	George McCrae, MP		
26 June 1908	Hugh Mack		
26 June 1908	James Augustus Henry Murray, LLD, DCL		
26 June 1908	Peter Reilly O'Connell, MD		
26 June 1908	Robert John Price, MP		
26 June 1908	Richard Stapley		
26 June 1908	Charles Cheers Wakefield	Alderman and Sheriff of the City of London	
26 June 1908	James Henry Young	Member of the Executive Council and of the House of Assembly, Bahama Islands	
26 June 1908	William Ascroft		
26 June 1908	William Glenholme Falconbridge	Chief Justice of the King's Bench, High Court of Justice of the Province of Ontario	
26 June 1908	Stephen Henry Parker	Chief Justice of the State of Western Australia	
26 June 1908	Henri Thomas Taschereau	Chief Justice of Quebec	
26 June 1908	The Hon. John Hannah Gordon	Judge of the Supreme Court of South Australia	
26 June 1908	Percival Maitland Laurence	Judge of the Supreme Court of the Cape of Good Hope	
26 June 1908	The Right Hon. Henry Weedon	Lord Mayor of the city of Melbourne	
26 June 1908	The Hon. George Henry Sutherland	Sheriff of Calcutta, and a Member of the Council of the Lieutenant-Governor of Bengal for making Laws and Regulations	
26 June 1908	The Hon. Vithaldas Damodar Thakarsi	Additional Member of the Council of the Governor of Bombay for making Laws and Regulations	
7 July 1908	Wilfred Lawrence Hepton	Lord Mayor of the City of Leeds. On the occasion of Their Majesties' visit to Leeds, for the purpose of opening the new University buildings in that City	
9 July 1908	Edward Burnet James	Lord Mayor of Bristol. On the occasion of the King and Queen's visit to Bristol to open the Royal Edward Dock.	
9 July 1908	William Howell Davies, MP	Chairman of the Bristol Docks Committee. On the occasion of the King and Queen's visit to Bristol to open the Royal Edward Dock.	
23 July 1908	The Hon. Lomer Gouin	Premier and Attorney-General of the Province of Quebec. On the occasion of the Prince of Wales's visit to Quebec.	
23 July 1908	The Hon. James Pliny Whitney, KC, LLD, DCL	Prime Minister and President of the Council of the Province of Ontario. On the occasion of the Prince of Wales's visit to Quebec.	
23 July 1908	John George Garneau	Mayor of the City of Quebec, and Chairman of The National Battlefields Commission, Quebec. On the occasion of the Prince of Wales's visit to Quebec.	
28 September 1908	Col. Philip Durham Trotter	Chairman of the General Executive Committee of the Queen Victoria Memorial School for the sons of Scottish Sailors and Soldiers at Dunblane. On the occasion of the opening of the school.	
9 November 1908	Robert Fulton Fulton (formerly Rampini)	Formerly Senior Puisne Judge of the High Court of Judicature at Fort William, in Bengal	
9 November 1908	Hefferman James Fritz Considine, CB, MVO	Deputy Inspector-General, Royal Irish Constabulary	
9 November 1908	John Bromley, CB	Accountant-General to the Board of Education	
9 November 1908	Rear-Admiral Sydney Marow Eardley-Wilmot	Superintendent of Ordnance Stores, Admiralty	
9 November 1908	Frederick Prat Alliston	Former Deputy Chairman of the London County Council	
9 November 1908	Thomas Barclay		
9 November 1908	Nathan Bodington	Vice-Chancellor of the University of Leeds	
9 November 1908	Charles Burt	Senior Member of the Thames Conservancy Board	
9 November 1908	James Henry Dalziel, MP		
9 November 1908	James Duckworth, MP		
9 November 1908	Herbert George Fordham	Chairman of the Cambridge County Council	
9 November 1908	George James Frampton, RA	Sculptor	
9 November 1908	Richard Charles Garton		
9 November 1908	Jonathan Hutchinson, MD, FRCS	Consulting Surgeon, London Hospital	
9 November 1908	Thomas Buxton Morrish	Chairman of the British and Foreign School Society	
9 November 1908	Thomas Oliver, MD, FRS		
9 November 1908	Robert James Thompson	Treasury Valuer and Inspector of Rates	
9 November 1908	Joseph John Thomson, DSc, FRS	Cavendish Professor of Experimental Physics, University of Cambridge	
9 November 1908	Edward Daniel Walker		
9 November 1908	Luke White, MP		
9 November 1908	Steward Woodhouse, MD	Formerly Member of the General Prisons Board, Ireland	
9 November 1908	Archibald FitzGerald Law	Chief Judicial Commissioner, Federated Malay States	
9 November 1908	Lt-Col. the Hon. Albert John Gould	President of the Senate of the Commonwealth of Australia	
9 November 1908	Alessandro Chapelle, Baron of San Giovanni, LLD	One of His Majesty's Judges for the Island of Malta and its Dependencies	
9 November 1908	Hugh Graham		
