= List of knights bachelor appointed in 2007 =

Knight Bachelor is the oldest and lowest-ranking form of knighthood in the British honours system; it is the rank granted to a man who has been knighted by the monarch but not inducted as a member of one of the organised orders of chivalry. Women are not knighted; in practice, the equivalent award for a woman is appointment as Dame Commander of the Order of the British Empire (founded in 1917).

== Knights bachelor appointed in 2007 ==
Date gazetted	Name	Notes	Ref.
6 March 2007	The Honourable Mr Justice (Nigel John Martin) Teare.		
22 March 2007	The Honourable Mr Justice (Wyn Lewis) Williams		
2 May 2007	The Honourable Mr Justice (Launcelot Dinadan James) Henderson		
12 June 2007	The Honourable Mr Justice (William Benjamin Synge) Stephens		
12 June 2007	The Honourable Mr Justice (James Mary) Treacy (Seamus Treacy)		
15 June 2007	John William Baker, CBE	Chair, Senior Salaries Review Body and Public Services Remuneration Committee. For public service.	
15 June 2007	Professor Christopher Alan Bayly	Vere Harmsworth Professor of Imperial and Naval History, University of Cambridge. For services to History.	
15 June 2007	Ian Terence Botham, OBE	For services to Charity and to Cricket.	
15 June 2007	Rodney George Brooke, CBE, DL	Chair, General Social Care Council. For public service.	
15 June 2007	Stephen Michael Bullock	Mayor, London Borough of Lewisham. For services to Local Government.	
15 June 2007	William Henry Callaghan, JP	Chair, Health and Safety Commission. For services to Health and Safety.	
15 June 2007	Peter Derek Carr, CBE, DL	Chair, North East Strategic Health Authority. For services to the NHS.	
15 June 2007	Professor George Castledine	Professor of Nursing, University of Central England and Consultant of Nursing, Dudley Group of Hospitals NHS Trust. For services to Healthcare.	
15 June 2007	Professor Peter Frederic Chester Cook	Architect and Teacher. For services to Architecture.	
15 June 2007	Charles Ireland Gray, CBE, JP	Lately Convenor of Education, North Lanarkshire Council. For services to Education.	
15 June 2007	John Kevin Hegarty	Creative Director and chair, Bartle, Bogle Hegarty Ltd. For services to the Advertising Industry.	
15 June 2007	Professor Brian John Hoskins, CBE, QPM	Professor of Meteorology, University of Reading. For services to Environmental Science.	
15 June 2007	Paul Joseph Scott-Lee, QPM, DL	Chief Constable, West Midlands Police. For services to the Police.	
15 June 2007	Professor David Melville, CBE	Vice-Chancellor, University of Kent. For services to Higher and Further Education.	
15 June 2007	Torquil Patrick Alexander Norman, CBE	Founder, Roundhouse Trust. For services to the Arts and to Disadvantaged Young People.	
15 June 2007	Professor David John Read	Vice-president and Biological Secretary, Royal Society. For services to Biological Sciences.	
15 June 2007	Richard Ellis Meuric Rees, CBE	For services to Agriculture and to Public Life in Wales.	
15 June 2007	Arthur James Rose, CBE, Education Consultant and chair, Review of Teaching of Early Reading. For services to Education.		
15 June 2007	Norman Leon Rosenthal, Exhibitions Secretary, Royal Academy of Arts. For services to Art.		
15 June 2007	Ahmed Salman Rushdie, Author. For services to Literature.		
15 June 2007	George Malcolm Williamson, chair, CDC Group plc. For services to the Financial Services Industry.		
15 June 2007	Ramon Richard Thurecht, OBE For services to commerce and the community. (In the Papua New Guinea honours list)		
27 June 2007	The Honourable Mr Justice (John) Griffith Williams		
28 June 2007	The Honourable Mr Justice (Timothy Roger Alan) King		
10 July 2007	The Honourable Mr Justice (Andrew John Gregory) Moylan		
25 July 2007	The Honourable Mr Justice (John Henry Boulton) Saunders		
4 December 2007	The Honourable Mr Justice (Julian Martin) Flaux		
4 December 2007	The Honourable Mr Justice (Paul Hyacinth) Morgan		
29 December 2007	Dr. John Michael Ashworth. For public service.		
29 December 2007	Professor John Irving Bell, Regius Professor of Medicine, University of Oxford and President, Academy of Medical Sciences. For services to Medicine.		
29 December 2007	John James Griffen Good, CBE, chair, Edrington Group. For services to Industry in Scotland.		
29 December 2007	Dr. Patrick Hugh Haren, deputy chairman, Viridian Group Ltd. For services to the Electricity Industry in Northern Ireland.		
29 December 2007	Michael Frank Harris, lately President, Social Security and Child Support Appeals Tribunal and Circuit Judge. For public service.		
29 December 2007	Professor Roger Mark Jowell, CBE, co-founder and Director, European Social Survey and research professor, City University. For services to Social Science.		
29 December 2007	Nicholas Roger Kenyon, CBE, managing director, Barbican Centre and lately Director, BBC Proms. For services to Classical Music.		
29 December 2007	Alasdair Uist Macdonald, CBE, Headteacher, Morpeth School, Tower Hamlets, London. For services to Education.		
29 December 2007	Professor Alexander Fred Markham, lately Chief Executive, Cancer Research UK. For services to Medicine.		
29 December 2007	Ian Gerald McAllister, CBE, chair, Network Rail. For services to Transport.		
29 December 2007	Robert Naylor, Chief Executive, University College London Hospitals NHS Foundation Trust. For services to Healthcare.		
29 December 2007	Professor Timothy Michael Martin O’Shea, Principal and Vice-Chancellor, University of Edinburgh. For services to Higher Education.		
29 December 2007	Michael Parkinson, CBE, Television and Radio Presenter. For services to Broadcasting.		
29 December 2007	Professor Bruce Anthony John Ponder, Head, Department of Oncology, University of Cambridge and Li Ka Shing Professor and Director, Cancer Research UK Cambridge Research Institute. For services to Medicine.		
29 December 2007	Stuart Alan Ransom Rose, Chief Executive, Marks and Spencer plc. For services to the Retail Industry and to Corporate Social Responsibility.		
29 December 2007	James Meyer Sassoon. For services to the Finance Industry and to public service.		
29 December 2007	Professor John Stewart Savill, Professor of Experimental Medicine, Head of the College of Medicine and Veterinary Medicine, and Vice-Principal, University of Edinburgh. For services to Clinical Science.		
29 December 2007	John William Sorrell, CBE, chair, the Sorrell Foundation and the London Design Festival. For services to the Creative Industries.		
29 December 2007	Alderman John Boothman Stuttard, JP, lately Lord Mayor of the City of London. For public service.		
29 December 2007	Professor Brian William Vickers, Senior Fellow, School of Advanced Study, University of London. For services to Literary Scholarship.		
29 December 2007	Professor Ian Wilmut, OBE, Director, Scottish Centre for Regenerative Medicine. For services to Science.		
29 December 2007	Dr. Albert Cecil Graham. For services to medicine and paediatric medicine.		
