= List of knights bachelor appointed in 2005 =

Knight Bachelor is the oldest and lowest-ranking form of knighthood in the British honours system; it is the rank granted to a man who has been knighted by the monarch but not inducted as a member of one of the organised orders of chivalry. Women are not knighted; in practice, the equivalent award for a woman is appointment as Dame Commander of the Order of the British Empire (founded in 1917).

== Knights bachelor appointed in 2005 ==
Date gazetted	Name	Notes	Ref.
8 February 2005	The Honourable Mr Justice (Donnell Justin Patrick) Deeny.		
11 February 2005	The Honourable Mr Justice (Paul James) Walker.		
15 February 2005	The Honourable Mr Justice (Christopher Simon Courtenay Stephenson) Clarke.		
15 February 2005	The Honourable Mr Justice (Anthony Ronald) Hart.		
24 February 2005	The Honourable Mr Justice (Henry Egar Garfield).		
7 June 2005	The Honourable Mr Justice (Nicholas Roger) Warren.		
7 June 2005	The Honourable Mr Justice (Andrew Ewart) McFarlane.		
11 June 2005	Thomas David Guy Arculus	Chair, Better Regulation Task Force. For public service.	
11 June 2005	Professor Michael Blaydon Barber	Prime Minister's Chief Advisor on delivery and Head of the Prime Minister's Delivery Unit.	
11 June 2005	Christopher James Clarke, OBE	Leader, Liberal Democrat Group, Local Government Association. For services to Local Government	
11 June 2005	George Edwin Cox	For services to Business.	
11 June 2005	Philip Lee Craven, MBE	President, International Paralympic Committee. For services to Paralympic Sport.	
11 June 2005	Roderick Ian Eddington	Chief Executive, British Airways plc. For services to Civil Aviation.	
11 June 2005	Professor Roderick Castle Floud	President, London Metropolitan University. For services to Higher Education.	
11 June 2005	Professor Richard Lavenham Gardner	Royal Society Professor of Zoology, University of Oxford. For services to Biological Sciences.	
11 June 2005	Clive Daniel Gillinson, CBE	Managing Director, London Symphony Orchestra. For services to Music	
11 June 2005	Professor John Rankine Goody	Emeritus Professor of Social Anthropology, St. John's College, University of Cambridge. For services to Social Anthropology.	
11 June 2005	Donald Gordon	For services to the Arts and to Business.	
11 June 2005	Dr. John Armstrong Muir Gray, CBE	NHS Director of Knowledge Management and Programmes Director, UK National Screening Committee. For services to the NHS.	
11 June 2005	Thomas Blane Hunter	Founding Partner, West Coast Capital. For services to Philanthropy and to Entrepreneurship in Scotland.	
11 June 2005	David Jason, OBE	Actor. For services to Drama.	
11 June 2005	Professor Peter Knight, Head of Department of Physics, Imperial College, London. For services to Optical Physics.		
11 June 2005	Callum McCarthy, Chair, Financial Services Authority. For services to the Finance Sector.		
11 June 2005	Hugh Stephen Roden Orde, OBE, Chief Constable Police Service of Northern Ireland. For services to Northern Ireland.		
11 June 2005	Michael Edward Pitt, Chief Executive, Kent County Council. For services to Local Government.		
11 June 2005	David John Prosser, Group Chief Executive and Director, Legal and General Group plc. For services to the Insurance Industry.		
11 June 2005	William Rae, QPM, Chief Constable, Strathclyde Police. For services to the Police.		
11 June 2005	The Chief Rabbi Dr. Jonathan Sacks. For services to the Community and to Inter-faith Relations.		
11 June 2005	Iqbal Abdul Karim Mussa Sacranie, OBE. For services to the Muslim community, to Charities and to Community Relations.		
11 June 2005	Pritpal Singh, Headteacher, Drayton Manor High School, Ealing, London. For services to Education.		
11 June 2005	John Rowland Tomlinson, CBE, Opera Singer. For services to Music.		
11 June 2005	The Honourable Michael David Kadoorie. For charitable services in the UK and overseas.		
11 June 2005	Dr. David Li Kwok-po, OBE. For services to education in the UK.		
11 June 2005	Hugh Stephen Roden ORDE, O.B.E., Chief Constable Police Service of Northern Ireland. For services to Northern Ireland.		
11 June 2005	Justice Salamo Injia. For services to the Judiciary.		
4 November 2005	The Honourable Mr Justice (Brian Frederick James) Langstaff.		
31 December 2005	Professor John Macleod Ball, Sedleian Professor of Natural Philosophy, University of Oxford. For services to Science.		
31 December 2005	Professor Ivor Martin Crewe, DL, Vice-Chancellor, University of Essex and Lately President, Universities UK. For services to Higher Education.		
31 December 2005	John Dankworth, CBE, Jazz Musician. For services to Music.		
31 December 2005	Christopher Fox, QPM, President, Association of Chief Police Officers. For services to the Police.		
31 December 2005	William Benjamin Bowring Gammell, Chief Executive, Cairn Energy plc. For services to Industry in Scotland.		
31 December 2005	David Michael Hart, OBE, lately General-Secretary, National Association of Head Teachers. For services to Education.		
31 December 2005	Ian Bernard Vaughan Magee, CB, Second Permanent Secretary, Department for Constitutional Affairs.		
31 December 2005	Dr. Allen James McClay, CBE, Chairman, ALMAC and chairman, Queen's University of Belfast Foundation. For services to Business and to Charity in Northern Ireland.		
31 December 2005	Keith Mills, Chief Executive, London 2012. For services to Sport.		
31 December 2005	Simon Milton, leader, Westminster City Council. For services to Local Government.		
31 December 2005	Adrian Alastair Montague, CBE, Chairman, British Energy. For services to the Nuclear and Electricity Industries.		
31 December 2005	Stephen Alan Moss, lately Director of Nursing and Patient Services, Queen's Medical Centre, Nottingham. For services to the NHS.		
31 December 2005	Professor Michael Pepper, Professor of Physics, University of Cambridge. For services to Physics.		
31 December 2005	Craig Collins Reedie, CBE, lately chairman, British Olympic Association. For services to Sport.		
31 December 2005	John Henry Ritblat, Chairman, The British Land Company and Chairman of the Trustees, Wallace Collection. For services to the Arts.		
31 December 2005	Michael Berry Savory, lately Lord Mayor of the City of London. For services to the City of London.		
31 December 2005	Stephen Ashley Sherbourne, CBE, lately Chief of Staff to the Leader of the Opposition.		
31 December 2005	Roger Singleton, CBE, lately Chief Executive, Barnardo's. For services to Children.		
31 December 2005	Professor Graham Michael Teasdale, President, Royal College of Physicians and Surgeons of Glasgow. For services to Neurosurgery and victims of head injuries.		
31 December 2005	David Robert Varney, Permanent Secretary, HM Revenue and Customs.		
31 December 2005	Arnold Wesker, Playwright/Director. For services to Drama.		
31 December 2005	Thomas Jones Woodward, OBE	Singer. For services to Music.	
31 December 2005	Professor Nicholas Alcwyn Wright	Warden, Barts and the London, Queen Mary School of Medicine. For services to Medicine.	
