= List of knights bachelor appointed in 2002 =

Knight Bachelor is the oldest and lowest-ranking form of knighthood in the British honours system; it is the rank granted to a man who has been knighted by the monarch but not inducted as a member of one of the organised orders of chivalry. Women are not knighted; in practice, the equivalent award for a woman is appointment as Dame Commander of the Order of the British Empire (founded in 1917).

== Knights bachelor appointed in 2002 ==
Date	Name	Notes	Ref.
6 February 2002	The Honourable Mr Justice (Mark) Hedley		
6 February 2002	The Honourable Mr Justice (Richard Alan) Field		
3 May 2002	The Honourable Mr Justice (Christopher John) Pitchers		
7 May 2002	The Honourable Mr Justice (Peter Winston) Smith		
15 June 2002	Professor Peter Robert Frank Bell.	Professor of Surgery, Leicester. For services to Surgery.	
15 June 2002	Peter Thomas Blake, CBE	Artist. For services to Art.	
15 June 2002	Brian Anthony Briscoe	Chief executive, Local Government Association. For services to Local Government	
15 June 2002	Professor Partha Sarathi Dasgupta	Frank Ramsay Professor of Economics, University of Cambridge. For services to Economics	
15 June 2002	Robert Dowling	Headteacher, George Dixon Secondary School and Sixth Form College and also of Selly Oak Special School. For services to Special Needs Education	
15 June 2002	Roy Alan Gardner	Chief executive, Centrica plc. For services to the Gas and Electricity Industries	
15 June 2002	Max Macdonald Hastings	Lately Editor, Evening Standard and The Daily Telegraph. For services to Journalism	
15 June 2002	Michael Philip Jagger (Mick Jagger)	Singer and Songwriter. For services to popular music.	
15 June 2002	Professor Ian Kershaw	Professor of Modern History, University of Sheffield. For services to History	
15 June 2002	Professor Peter Julius Lachmann	For services to Medical Science	
15 June 2002	Professor John Stuart Lilleyman	Head, Paediatric Haematology and Oncology, Barts and The London School of Medicine. For services to Pathology	
15 June 2002	Professor Colin Renshaw Lucas	Vice-Chancellor, University of Oxford. For services to Higher Education	
15 June 2002	Philip John Courtney Mawer	Lately secretary General, Archbishops' Council and General Synod of the Church of England. For services to the Church of England	
15 June 2002	Thomas Fulton Wilson McKillop	Chief executive, AstraZeneca. For services to the Pharmaceutical Industry	
15 June 2002	Graham Meldrum, CBE, QFSM	Her Majesty's Chief Inspector of Fire Services, Department for Transport, Local Government and the Regions	
15 June 2002	Jonathan Wolfe Miller, CBE	Opera director. For services to music and the arts	
15 June 2002	Gulam Kaderbhoy Noon, MBE	For services to Industry	
15 June 2002	Trevor Robert Nunn, CBE	Director. For services to the Theatre	
15 June 2002	Peter Rigby	For services to Information Technology and to Business in the West Midlands	
15 June 2002	Robert William Robson, CBE	For services to Association Football	
15 June 2002	David Calvert-Smith, QC	Director of Public Prosecutions	
15 June 2002	Brian John Stewart, CBE	Chairman, Scottish and Newcastle plc. For services to Industry	
15 June 2002	Anthony John Patrick Vineall	Lately chairman, School Teachers' Review Body. For services to Education	
15 June 2002	Alfred Cecil Walker, JP	For political and public service	
15 June 2002	Keith Roderick Whitson	Group chief executive, HSBC Holdings plc. For services to Banking.	
15 June 2002	David Wilmot, QPM, DL	Chief Constable, Greater Manchester Police. For services to the Police	
15 June 2002	Nicholas Raymond Winterton, MP	Member of Parliament for Macclesfield. For services to Parliament	
15 June 2002	Ronald Wayne De Witt	Chief executive, North West London Strategic Health Authority. For services to the NHS.	
15 June 2002	Anthony Ian Young	Lately Senior Deputy General Secretary, Communication Workers' Union; president, TUC; Governor, BBC. For services to Employment Relations.	
15 June 2002	John Maxwell Middleton	For services to agriculture and the country. (In the Papua New Guinea honours list)	
15 June 2002	Cecil Albert Jacobs, CBE	For services to banking. (In the St Christopher and Nevis honours list)	
31 October 2002	The Honourable Mr Justice (Peregrine Charles Hugh) Simon.		
31 October 2002	The Honourable Mr Justice (Colman Maurice) Treacy.		
8 November 2002	The Honourable Mr Justice (Roger John) Royce.		
16 December 2002	The Honourable Mr Justice (Adrian Bruce) Fulford.		
31 December 2002	Alan Arthur Bates, CBE	Actor. For services to Drama.	
31 December 2002	Howard Bernstein	Chief Executive, Manchester City Council. For services to the Reconstruction of Manchester and the XVII Commonwealth Games.	
31 December 2002	Professor Clive Booth	Chairman, Teacher Training Agency. For services to Higher Education.	
31 December 2002	Peter Alexander Burt	Executive Deputy chairman, HBOS plc. For services to Banking.	
31 December 2002	Ewen James Hanning Cameron, D.L.	Chair, Countryside Agency. For services to the Countryside.	
31 December 2002	Ian James Carruthers, OBE	Chief Executive, Dorset and Somerset Strategic Health Authority. For services to the NHS.	
31 December 2002	William Joseph Connor	General Secretary, Union of Shop, Distributive and Allied Workers. For services to Industrial Relations.	
31 December 2002	Dan Crompton, CBE, QPM	Lately HM Inspector of Constabulary, Wakefield. For services to the Police.	
31 December 2002	Professor Alan Roy Fersht, FRS	Herchel Smith Professor, University of Cambridge. For services to Protein Science.	
31 December 2002	David Eardley Garrard	Chairman, Minerva PLC. For charitable services.	
31 December 2002	Professor David Michael Baldock Hall	President, Royal College of Paediatrics and Child Health; Professor of Community Paediatrics, Sheffield. For services to Medicine.	
31 December 2002	Graham Joseph Hall	Chairman, Yorkshire Forward. For services to Business in the Yorkshire and Humber Region.	
31 December 2002	Ewan William Harper, CBE	For services to the Church of England.	
31 December 2002	John Francis Jones	Headteacher, Maghull High School, Sefton, Liverpool. For services to Education.	
31 December 2002	Professor David Anthony King, FRS	Chief Scientific Adviser to the Government and Head, Office of Science and Technology, Department of Trade and Industry.	
31 December 2002	Archibald Johnstone Kirkwood, MP	Member of Parliament for Roxburgh and Berwickshire. For services to Parliament.	
31 December 2002	Alexander John (Sandy) Bruce-Lockhart, OBE	Leader, Kent County Council. For services to Local Government.	
31 December 2002	Professor Ravinder Nath Maini	Professor of Rheumatology and lately Head, Kennedy Institute of Rheumatology, Imperial College, London. For services to Rheumatology.	
31 December 2002	Brian John McMaster, CBE	Director. For services to the Edinburgh International Festival.	
31 December 2002	Peter Moores, CBE	For charitable services to the Arts.	
31 December 2002	Derek James Morris	Chairman, Competition Commission. For services to Industry.	
31 December 2002	Alderman James Michael Yorrick Oliver	Lately Lord Mayor of London. For services to the City of London.	
31 December 2002	John Edward Victor Rose	Chief Executive, Rolls-Royce plc. For services to the Defence and Aerospace Industries.	
31 December 2002	Ridley Scott	Director and Producer. For services to the British Film Industry.	
31 December 2002	Peter Michael Stothard	Lately Editor, The Times. For services to the Newspaper Industry.	
31 December 2002	Professor John Macqueen Ward, CBE	Chairman, Scottish Qualifications Agency. For services to Public Life in Scotland.	
31 December 2002	Nicholas George Winton, MBE	For services to humanity, in saving Jewish Children from Nazi-occupied Czechoslovakia, 1938–39.	
