= List of knights bachelor appointed in 2000 =

Knight Bachelor is the oldest and lowest-ranking form of knighthood in the British honours system; it is the rank granted to a man who has been knighted by the monarch but not inducted as a member of one of the organised orders of chivalry. Women are not knighted; in practice, the equivalent award for a woman is appointment as Dame Commander of the Order of the British Empire (founded in 1917).

== Knights bachelor appointed in 2000 ==
Date	Name	Notes (as they appeared in the official notice)	Ref
10 February 2000	The Honourable Mr. Justice John Bernard Goldring		
9 March 2000	The Honourable Mr. Justice Stephen Robert Silber		
9 June 2000	The Honourable Mr. Justice Richard Henry Quixano Henriques		
17 June 2000	Professor Anthony Barnes Atkinson	Warden, Nuffield College, University of Oxford. For services to Economics.	
17 June 2000	David Rowat Barclay	For charitable services.	
17 June 2000	Frederick Hugh Barclay	For charitable services.	
17 June 2000	David Sydney Rowe-Beddoe	Chairman, Welsh Development Agency. For services to Industrial and Economic Development in Wales.	
17 June 2000	Ian Charles Rayner Byatt	Director General of Water Services. For services to Water Consumers and to the Water Industry.	
17 June 2000	Michael Caine, CBE	Actor. For services to Drama.	
17 June 2000	William Martin Castell	Chief Executive, Nycomed Amersham plc. For services to the Life Sciences Industry.	
17 June 2000	Iain Geoffrey Chalmers	For services to health care.	
17 June 2000	Howard John Davies	Chairman, Financial Services Authority. For services to Financial Regulation.	
17 June 2000	Stuart Anthony Lipton	Chief Executive, Stanhope. For services to the Property Industry and to the Environment.	
17 June 2000	Murdo Maclean	Private Secretary to the Chief Whip, Chief Whip's Office, 12 Downing Street.	
17 June 2000	Professor Roderick Norman McIver MacSween	Lately President, Royal College of Pathologists and chairman, Academy of Medical Royal Colleges. For services to Medicine and to Pathology.	
17 June 2000	Neil William David McIntosh, CBE	Chairman, Scottish Council for Voluntary Organisations. For services to the community.	
17 June 2000	Graham Morgan	Executive Director of Nursing and Quality, North West London Hospitals NHS Trust. For services to Health Care.	
17 June 2000	Professor Howard Joseph Newby, CBE	Vice-Chancellor, University of Southampton. For services to Higher Education.	
17 June 2000	John David Phillips, QPM	Chief Constable, Kent County Constabulary. For services to Police.	
17 June 2000	Professor George Karoly Radda, CBE, FRS	Chief Executive, Medical Research Council. For services to Biomedical Science.	
17 June 2000	Professor John Shipley Rowlinson, FRS	For services to Chemistry, Chemical Engineering and to Education.	
17 June 2000	Paul Brierley Smith, CBE	Designer. For services to the Fashion Industry.	
17 June 2000	George Sweeney	Principal, Knowsley Community College. For services to Further Education.	
17 June 2000	Robert Andrew Wales	Leader, London Borough of Newham. For services to Local Government.	
17 June 2000	John Anthony Wall, CBE	Chairman, Royal National Institute for the Blind. For services to Disabled People.	
17 June 2000	Professor Adrian Leonard Webb	Vice-Chancellor, University of Glamorgan. For services to Higher Education.	
17 June 2000	Alan Charles Laurence Whistler, CBE	Glass engraver, poet and writer. For services to Art.	
17 June 2000	Nicholas Charles Young	Chief Executive, Macmillan Cancer Relief. For services to Cancer Care.	
17 June 2000	Bernard Schreier	For services to the development of UK-Hungary trade.	
17 June 2000	Charles Othniel Williams	For servies to business, construction and sports. (In the Barbados honours list)	
17 June 2000	Justice Robert Kynnersley Woods, CBE	For services to law and the community. (In honours in Papua New Guinea)	
21 June 2000	Mr. Justice Charles Michael Dennis Byron	Chief Justice of the Eastern Caribbean Court.	
28 June 2000	The Honourable Mr. Justice Richard John Hedley Gibbs		
28 June 2000	The Honourable Mr. Justice Stephen Miles Tomlinson		
05 July 2000	Sean Connery	Actor. For services to drama.	
21 July 2000	The Honourable Mr. Justice Peter Francis Crane		
21 July 2000	The Honourable Mr. Justice Geoffrey Douglas Grigson		
25 July 2000	The Honourable Mr. Justice James Lawrence Munby		
25 October 2000	The Honourable Mr. Justice Stanley Jeffrey Burnton		
17 November 2000	The Honourable Mr. Justice Andrew Charles Smith		
22 November 2000	The Honourable Mr. Justice Lawrence Antony Collins		
22 November 2000	The Honourable Mr. Justice Patrick James Hunt		
13 December 2000	The Honourable Mr. Justice Nicholas John Patten		
14 December 2000	The Honourable Mr. Justice Paul James Duke Coleridge		
30 December 2000	Nicolas Bevan, CB	Speaker's Secretary, House of Commons.	
30 December 2000	Professor Leszek Krzysztof Borysiewicz	Professor of Medicine, University of Wales. For services to Medical Research and Education.	
30 December 2000	Stanley William Clarke, CBE	For services to the community in Staffordshire.	
30 December 2000	Ronald Cohen	Chairman, Apax Partners and Co. For services to the Venture Capital Industry.	
30 December 2000	Thomas Daniel Courtenay	Actor. For services to Drama.	
30 December 2000	Edward Michael Crew, QPM	Chief Constable, West Midlands Police. For services to the Police.	
30 December 2000	Robert Paul Culpin	Managing Director, Budget and Public finances, H.M. Treasury.	
30 December 2000	Professor Christopher Thomas Evans, OBE	For services to the Bioscience Industry.	
30 December 2000	Andrew William Foster	Controller, Audit Commission. For services to Local Government and to the NHS.	
30 December 2000	Alasdair MacLeod Fraser, CB, QC	For services to the Criminal Justice System.	
30 December 2000	Professor Christopher John Frayling	Rector and Vice Provost, Royal College of Art. For services to Art and Design Education.	
30 December 2000	Barry Trevor Jackson	Surgeon and President, Royal College of Surgeons. For services to Training and Education in Surgery.	
30 December 2000	Richard Cornelius MacCormac, CBE	Architect. For services to Architecture.	
30 December 2000	Clive Haydon Martin, OBE, TD, DL	Lately Lord Mayor of London. For services to the Corporation of London.	
30 December 2000	David McMurtry, CBE	Chief Executive, Renishaw plc. For services to Design and Innovation.	
30 December 2000	Duncan Michael	Chairman of Trustees, Ove Arup Partnership. For services to Engineering and Construction.	
30 December 2000	Patrick Alfred Caldwell Moore, CBE	For services to the Popularisation of Science and to Broadcasting.	
30 December 2000	John Orr, OBE, QPM	Chief Constable, Strathclyde Police. For services to the Police.	
30 December 2000	Thomas John Parker	Group Chairman, Babcock International. For services to the Defence and Shipbuilding Industries.	
30 December 2000	Charles Pollard, QPM	Chief Constable, Thames Valley Police. For services to the Police.	
30 December 2000	Steven Geoffrey Redgrave, CBE	For services to Rowing.	
30 December 2000	Peter Levin Shaffer, CBE	Playwright. For services to Drama.	
30 December 2000	Professor Christopher Hubert Llewellyn Smith, FRS	Provost and President, University College London. For services to Particle Physics.	
30 December 2000	John Edward Sulston, FRS	Lately Director, Sanger Centre. For services to Genome Research.	
30 December 2000	Professor Christopher John White, CVO	For services to Art History.	
30 December 2000	David Martin Brown	For services to British industry.	
30 December 2000	Dr Anthony John Francis O’Reilly	For long and distinguished service to Northern Ireland.	
30 December 2000	Peter Leslie Charles Barter, OBE		
30 December 2000	Robert John Sinclair		
