= List of knights bachelor appointed in 1909 =

Knight Bachelor is the oldest and lowest-ranking form of knighthood in the British honours system; it is the rank granted to a man who has been knighted by the monarch but not inducted as a member of one of the organised orders of chivalry. Women are not knighted; in practice, the equivalent award for a woman is appointment as Dame Commander of the Order of the British Empire (founded in 1917).

== Knights bachelor appointed in 1909 ==
Date	Name	Notes	Ref
1 February 1909	Rai Bahadur Pratul Chandra Chatterji, CIE	Vice-Chancellor of the University of the Punjab, lately a Judge of the Chief Court of the Punjab	
1 February 1909	Basil Scott	Chief Justice of the High Court of Judicature, Bomba	
1 February 1909	Ernest John Trevelyan, DCL	Barrister-at-Law, Reader in Indian Law at the University of Oxford, lately one of the Judges of the High Court of Judicature at Fort William in Bengal	
1 February 1909	William Egelric Bigge	Lately a Judge of the Chief Court of Lower Burma	
1 February 1909	Frederick Charles Holiday	Lately Auditor of the Accounts of the Secretary of State for India in Council	
15 February 1909	John Andrew Hamilton	Justice of the High Court of Justices	
26 June 1909	Thomas Edward Thorpe, CB, FRS	Principal of the Government Laboratories	
26 June 1909	John James Baddeley	Sheriff of the City of London	
26 June 1909	Thomas Arthur Bramsdon, MP		
26 June 1909	Francis Joseph Campbell, LLD	Principal of the Royal Normal College for the Blind	
26 June 1909	Arthur Chapman	Formerly Consul-General at Rio de Janeiro	
26 June 1909	Merton Russell Cotes		
26 June 1909	Samuel Dill, LittD, LLD	Member of the Intermediate Education Board for Ireland	
26 June 1909	John Duncan		
26 June 1909	Francis Stanhope Hanson	Alderman and Sheriff of the City of London	
26 June 1909	Lt-Col. George Kemp		
26 June 1909	Hugh Percy Lane	Honorary Director, Municipal Art Gallery, Dublin, and Governor of National Gallery, Ireland	
26 June 1909	Joseph Larmor, DSc, FRS	Secretary of the Royal Society; Lucasian Professor of Mathematics at Cambridge	
26 June 1909	Lt-Col. William Boog Leishman, MB, RAMC		
26 June 1909	Henry William Lucy		
26 June 1909	Richard Mackie		
26 June 1909	Thomas Mason		
26 June 1909	Thomas Matthews	Chief Engineer of the Trinity House	
26 June 1909	Walter Menzies, MP		
26 June 1909	Mark Oldroyd		
26 June 1909	Robert Harry Inglis Palgrave, FRS		
26 June 1909	Edwin Pears		
26 June 1909	Arthur Wing Pinero		
26 June 1909	William Edward Briggs Priestley, MP		
26 June 1909	George Allardice Riddell		
26 June 1909	William Alexander Smith	Founder and Organizer of the Boys' Brigade	
26 June 1909	Arthur John Tedder	Chief Inspector of Excise	
26 June 1909	John Edward Thrift	Chief Inspector of Stamps and Taxes, Inland Revenue Department	
26 June 1909	Herbert Beerbohm Tree		
26 June 1909	Maj. Henry Francis Trippel		
26 June 1909	James Henry Yoxall, MP		
26 June 1909	The Hon. Arthur Hay Stewart Reid	Chief Judge of the Chief Court of the Punjab	
26 June 1909	Edwin Grant Burls, CSI	Director-General of Stores, India Office	
26 June 1909	The Hon. Cornthwaite Hector Rason	Agent-General in London for the State of Western Australia	
26 June 1909	Charles Frederick Lumb, LLD	lately Puisne Judge of the Supreme Court of Judicature, Jamaica	
26 June 1909	Walter Kennaway, CMG	Secretary, Office of the High Commissioner in London for the Dominion of New Zealand	
26 June 1909	Francis Galton, ScD, FRS	Honorary Fellow of Trinity College, Cambridge	
26 June 1909	Thomas Carlaw Martin, LLD		
26 June 1909	Charles Robert Tyser	Chief Justice of the Supreme Court of Cyprus	
26 June 1909	The Hon. Richard William Scott, KC, LLD	Member of the Senate of the Dominion of Canada, and lately Secretary of State for Canada	
26 June 1909	George Bowen Simpson	Acting Chief Justice of the Supreme Court of New South Wales	
26 June 1909	Thomas à Beckett	Puisne Judge of the Supreme Court of Victoria	
26 June 1909	Frederick George Dumayne	Vice-chairman of the Calcutta Port Trust	
26 June 1909	Cecil Harcourt Smith	Director and Secretary of the Art Museum at the Victoria and Albert Museum. On the occasion of the King and Queen's visit to South Kensington to open the museum's new buildings.	
6 July 1909	William Cobbett	Chairman of the Board of Management of the Manchester Royal Infirmary. On the occasion of the King and Queen's visit to Manchester to opening the infirmary's new buildings.	
7 July 1909	George Hamilton Kenrick	Lord Mayor of the City of Birmingham. On the occasion of the King and Queen's visit to Birmingham to open the new city's new university buildings.	
4 November 1909	Frederick Orridge Macmillan	Chairman of the Board of Management of the National Hospital for the Paralysed and Epileptic. On the occasion of the opening of the hospital's Jubilee Extension Buildings.	
9 November 1909	Alfred Richard Pennefather, CB	Receiver for the Metropolitan Police District	
9 November 1909	Ernest Henry Shackleton, CVO		
9 November 1909	James Humphreys Harrison, MVO	Late Deputy Clerk of the Council	
9 November 1909	Francis Flint Belsey		
9 November 1909	John Brigg, MP		
9 November 1909	Arthur Trevor Dawson		
9 November 1909	Charles Friswell		
9 November 1909	Robert Laidlaw, MP		
9 November 1909	James Lemon		
9 November 1909	Frederick Low, KC		
9 November 1909	James Matthew Moody, MRCS		
9 November 1909	Walter John Napier, DCL	Attorney-General, Straits Settlements	
9 November 1909	Henry William Newton		
9 November 1909	Arthur Nicholson		
9 November 1909	William Robertson Nicoll, LLD		
9 November 1909	David Paulin		
9 November 1909	George Herbert Pollard, MD, MP		
9 November 1909	William Augustus Tilden, DSc, FRS		
9 November 1909	Henry Whitaker Trickett	sometime Mayor of Rawtenstall.	
9 November 1909	Evan Vincent-Evans		
9 November 1909	Daniel Tupper, MVO		
9 November 1909	The Hon. George McLean	Member the Legislative Council of the Dominion of New Zealand	
9 November 1909	Johannes Wilhelmus Wessels	Puisne Judge of the Supreme Court of the Transvaal	
9 November 1909	Robert Townley Scott, ISO	Secretary, Postmaster-General's Department, Commonwealth of Australia	
9 November 1909	Jesse Boot		
9 November 1909	The Hon. John William Taverner	Agent General for Victoria	
