= Louis Victor Delafaye =

Sir Louis Victor Delafaye (born 10 March 1842) was chief judge of the Supreme Court of the Colony of Mauritius from 1898 to 1912. He was knighted in 1901.
