= William Japp Sinclair =

Sir William Japp Sinclair was professor of obstetrics and gynaecology at the Victoria University of Manchester. He was knighted at Buckingham Palace in 1904.
