= Stanley Bois =

British businessman (1864-1938)

Sir Stanley Bois (20 June 1864 – 14 April 1938) was a British businessman who served his career in Ceylon in the late 19th and early 20th century.

== Early life and education ==
Bois was born in London on 20 June 1864. He was educated at South Penge Park College, London.

== Career ==
Bois began his career in 1880 working in a ship broker's office in London. In 1882, he went to Ceylon and joined the firm of Alstons, Scott & Co, as an assistant where his brother Percy Bois had been employed since 1873. In 1891, the company ceased trading due to the slump in the coffee industry, its principal business, and was taken over by Bois and his brother trading as 'Bois Bros & Co'.

Bois Bros & Co became a leading firm in Ceylon trading as general merchants, exporters, estate and commission agents. In taking over the firm of Alstons, Bois acquired its lucrative agency of the British India Steam Navigation Company which operated ships transporting passengers and goods on the route from Ceylon to India and London. Bois also became a prominent dealer in the burgeoning tea industry, acting as general agents, packers and shippers for a number of the tea estates, and performed similar services for rubber industry.

Bois was influential in the public life of Ceylon. He was a member of the Colombo Municipal Council; Chairman of the Ceylon Chamber of Commerce; member of the Legislative Council of Ceylon representing the mercantile community; President of the Rubber Grower's Association; and President of the Ceylon Association in London. In 1904, he was appointed Commissioner-General for Ceylon to the St Louis World's Fair. His brother Percy became honorary vice consul for Sweden–Norway in Colombo in November 1889 and was honorary consul for Sweden between 1904 and 1910, when Stanley took over as acting consul between February 1910 and September 1911.

== Personal life and death ==
Bois married three times. His first wife, Isa Gordon, with whom he had a daughter, committed suicide in 1910. With his third wife, he had a son and a daughter.

Bois died on 14 April 1938, aged 73.

== Honours ==
In 1905, Bois received a Knighthood for public services.
