= John Gavey =

Sir John Gavey (1842 – 1923) was an English telegraph worker notable for achieving the first wireless communication across water. Gavey was born at St. Helier in Jersey and was the only son of Captain John Gavey of the merchant navy and Elizabeth Jeanne Falle. His active professional career commenced in 1861 when he entered the service of the Electric and International Telegraph Co., and his experience of 10 years in the development of the telegraphic business under private enterprise was always highly valued by him.

On the acquisition of the telegraphs by the State in 1870 Sir John became a civil servant, receiving the appointment of Superintendent of the South-Eastern division of telegraphs and subsequently of the Great Western sub-division of the Southern division of England with headquarters at Bristol. In 1878 he removed to Cardiff, having been appointed Superintendent Engineer of the South Wales district.

== First wireless communication across water ==
Contrary to the commonly reported opinion that Guglielmo Marconi was the first to achieve the first wireless communication across water, it was in fact achieved some 4–5 years earlier by Gavey in his role as Superintendent Engineer of the South Wales district for her Majesty's Post Office from Lavernock to Flat Holm and it is probably to allow comparison with the earlier experiments that Marconi chose to transmit from this location to the island.

The success of this earlier work was reported in the Flintshire Observer Mining Journal and General Advertiser for the Counties of Flint Denbigh on 9 February 1893.

Some successful experiments have just been made to see if it were possible to establish an electric communication between two distant points without any connecting wire. A wire supported on light post was run along the Welsh coast, commencing at Lavernock Point, a little south of Cardiff, and continuing for about a mile. Some three miles from this part of the shore is the island of Flat Holme. Here another line was erected about half a mile in length. At Lavernock Point there was a powerful generator, and the island line was furnished with a sounder to receive the messages. The messages thus telegraphed along the mainland wires were repeated distinctly on the little island of the Bristol Channel.
