= William Herbert Greaves =

British colonial judge

Chief Justice
- Constituency: Barbados

Personal details
- Born: 1 March 1857
- Died: 18 December 1936 (aged 79)

Sir William Herbert Greaves (1 March 1857 – 18 December 1936) was a British colonial judge who was chief justice of Barbados. He was knighted in 1904.

Greaves was educated at Codrington Grammar School in Barbados and St Edmund Hall, Oxford. He was called to the bar at Middle Temple in 1880. He became solicitor general of Barbados in 1887, Queen's Council in 1890, attorney general of Barbados in 1896. He was chief justice in 1902.
