= Knight Bachelor =

Title indicating a knight not part of an order of chivalry

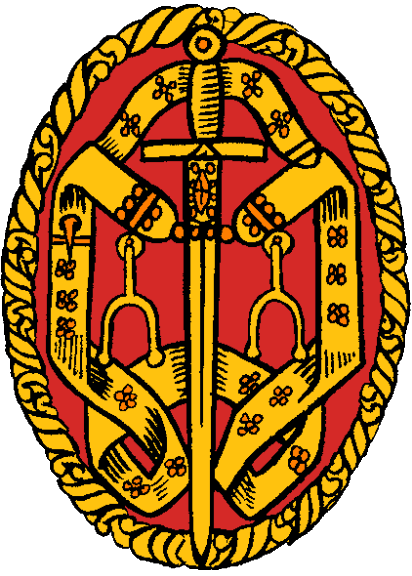
- Knight Bachelor's badge

Awarded by Monarch of the United Kingdom
- Awarded for: Public service
- Sovereign: Charles III
- Knight Principal: Sir Gary Hickinbottom
- Ribbon bar

In the British honours system, the title of Knight Bachelor is the basic rank granted to a man who has been knighted by the monarch but not inducted as a member of one of the organised orders of chivalry.

Knights Bachelor are the most ancient sort of British knight (the rank existed during the 13th-century reign of King Henry III), but Knights Bachelor rank below knights of chivalric orders. A man who is knighted is formally addressed as "Sir [First Name] [Surname]" or "Sir [First Name]" and his wife as "Lady [Surname]".

Awards of the knighthood are announced in The Gazette.

Bachelor in heraldic context means junior in rank.

== Criteria ==
Knighthood is usually conferred for public service; amongst its recipients are all male judges of His Majesty's High Court of Justice in England. It is possible to be a Knight Bachelor and a junior member of an order of chivalry without being a knight of that order; this situation has become rather common, especially among those recognized for achievements in entertainment. For instance, Sir Michael Caine, Sir Billy Connolly, Sir Mo Farah, Sir Barry Gibb, Sir Anthony Hopkins, Sir Derek Jacobi, Sir Elton John, Sir Brian May, Sir Roger Daltrey, and Sir Ian McKellen are Commanders of the Most Excellent Order of the British Empire (CBE); Sir Tom Jones, Sir Van Morrison, Sir Cliff Richard, and Sir Idris Elba are Officers of the Most Excellent Order of the British Empire (OBE); while Sir Nick Faldo, Sir Lewis Hamilton, Sir Paul McCartney, and Sir Richard Starkey (Ringo Starr) are Members of the Most Excellent Order of the British Empire (MBE).

== Honorifics and post-nominal letters ==
Knights Bachelor may prefix "Sir" to their forenames, and wives of Knights may prefix "Lady" to their surnames. The award originated in the Middle Ages. There are no post-nominal letters associated with the honour nor can it be awarded to women. (They are instead appointed Dames Commander of the Order of the British Empire.)

== Insignia ==
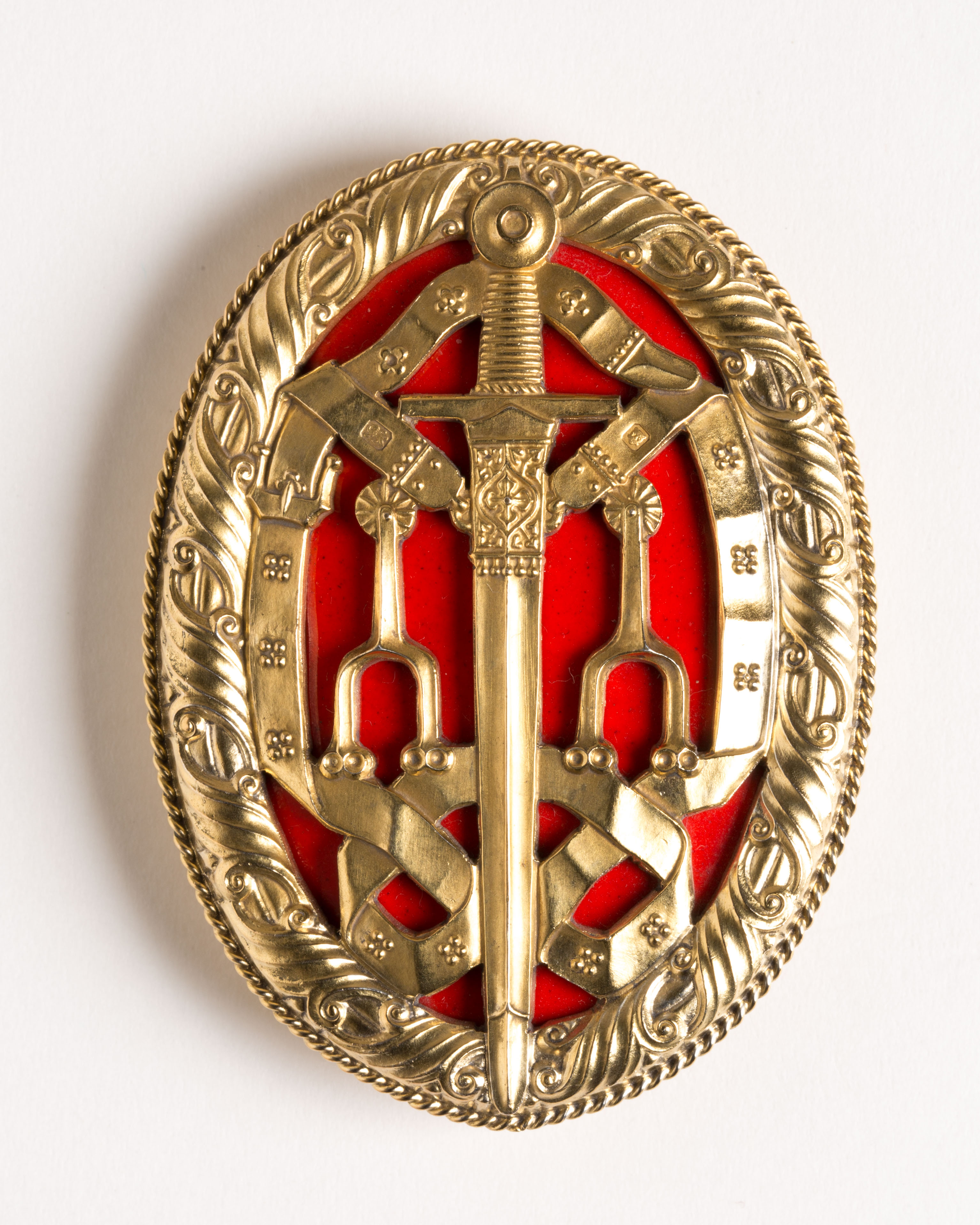
A type II Knight Bachelor's badge

Until 1926, Knights Bachelor had no specific insignia which they could wear, but in that year, King George V issued a warrant authorising the wearing of a breast badge on all appropriate occasions by Knights Bachelor. This badge is worn on the left side of the coat or outer garment. Measuring 2 3/8 inches (60 mm) in length and 1 3/8 inches (35 mm) in width, it is described in heraldic terms as follows:

Upon an oval medallion of vermilion, enclosed by a scroll a cross-hilted sword belted and sheathed, pommel upwards, between two spurs, rowels upwards, the whole set about with the sword belt, all gilt.

In 1973, Queen Elizabeth II issued a further warrant authorising the wearing on appropriate occasions of a neck badge (of smaller size) and a miniature medal. In 1988, a new certificate of authentication, a Knight Bachelor's only personal documentation, was designed by the College of Arms.

== Imperial society ==
The Imperial Society of Knights Bachelor was founded for the maintenance and consolidation of the Dignity of Knights Bachelor in 1908, and obtained official recognition from the Sovereign in 1912. The Society keeps records of all Knights Bachelor, in their interest.

== Female nonequivalence ==
There is no female counterpart to Knight Bachelor. The lowest knightly honour that can be conferred upon a woman is Dame Commander of the Most Excellent Order of the British Empire (DBE), which is one rank higher than Knight Bachelor (being the female equivalent of KBE or Knight Commander of the Most Excellent Order of the British Empire, which is the next male knightly rank above Knight Bachelor).

== See also ==
- British honours system § Knighthood
- Central Chancery of the Orders of Knighthood
- Knight banneret
- Lists of knights bachelor
