= The Prescot School =

Location
- Knowsley Park Lane; Prescot, Merseyside, L34 3NB; England; 53.431222°N 2.811461°W

Information
- Type: Academy
- Motto: Futuram civitatem inquirimus Latin; We are seeking a future state
- Established: 1544; 482 years ago
- Founder: Gilbert Lathum
- Local authority: Knowsley
- Trust: The Heath Family Trust
- Department for Education URN: 142798 Tables
- Ofsted: Reports
- Gender: Coeducational
- Age: 11 to 16
- Enrolment: 798
- Colours: Blue and Black
- Website: http://prescotschool.org.uk/

The Prescot School is a coeducational secondary school located in Prescot, Merseyside, England. It was previously called Prescot Grammar School. It was announced in late 2015 by the headteacher, Judy Walker, that the historic name and the link to the school's near half-millennium of tradition (which had been altered between 2009 and 2015 by the local authority) was being restored as a consequence of a successful application by the school for academy status. The official opening of the reformed school was on 28 April.

The main historical source is local historian F. A. Bailey's 40-page pamphlet published to celebrate the 400th anniversary of the school in 1944 and reissued in 1971 under the title PGS 1544–1971 with postscripts by G. Dixon and the then headmaster, J. C. S. Weeks.

== History ==
=== Foundation ===
The school was founded in 1544 by Gilbert Lathum, a local clergyman (later Archdeacon of Man) who left £140 in his will to fund a schoolmaster (at a stipend of £7 per year) to run a free grammar school.

The school was first based in Church Street, opposite the Prescot Parish Church of St. Mary's. It then moved in 1760 to a site in High Street, where it remained until 1924. The next move was to the spacious site on St. Helens Road, accommodated in newly built wooden buildings which were originally intended to be temporary, but were expanded and augmented in the 1960s by a brick-built assembly hall ("Spencer Briggs Hall"), classrooms and purpose-built metalwork and woodwork workshops, and remained in use until 1978 when they fell victim to an arson attack by a disturbed former pupil.

Headteachers include C. W. H. Richardson, who ensured the school's survival during difficult times in the 1920s and 1930s, and R. Spencer Briggs from 1937 to 1963.

By 1944, when the Butler Education Act brought the school into the free national system, the school was in fact charging tuition fees. At this point, entry criteria passed from the ability to pay to the ability to pass the 11+ exam.

From the 1930s to the 1960s the school expanded under the leadership of headmaster R. Spencer Briggs to a peak of 650 boys. Briggs modelled his school superficially on the British public school model, with a 'house' system, prefects, school uniform, a heavy emphasis on games (particularly football and cricket), and indeed corporal punishment. There was also extracurricular activity: debating, amateur dramatics, choral and instrumental music, and school societies. During this period the school applied for and was granted its coat of arms. The Latin motto "Futuram civitatem inquirimus" translates as "Seeking society's future". In other words: "Looking forward".

=== Becoming comprehensive and co-educational (merger with the Girls' Grammar) ===
In 1975, it became part of the newly formed Metropolitan Borough of Knowsley, and joined with Prescot Grammar School for Girls (founded 1955) to become Prescot School. The school moved to the girls' school site as a result of two arson incidents at the Boys' School site in St. Helens Road. The extensive playing fields of the boys' school in St Helens Road were sold off and are now covered by a housing development.

In 2000 Prescot School gained specialist status as a Language College.

=== Merger with Higher Side ===
With funding from the Labour government's Building Schools for the Future initiative, the school was rebuilt, In September 2009 it merged with Higher Side School in Whiston to become officially named "Knowsley Park Centre for Learning, Serving Prescot, Whiston and the Wider Community" in 2009, listing as a compromise all the schools and communities merged into it. The name lasted seven years before its headmistress, who called the name "so embarrassing" changed it to simply "Prescot School" in 2016.

== Notable alumni ==
- Gill Burns MBE, former English Ladies Rugby Captain
- Paul Lewis, classical pianist, soloist at the 2005 Last Night of the Proms
- Dave McCabe, The Zutons lead singer
- Zara Shaw, professional footballer for Liverpool F.C. Women
- Colin Vearncombe, singer songwriter formerly known as the artist Black
- Rob Vincent, former professional footballer for D.C. United, in MLS

=== Prescot Grammar School (both schools) ===
- Alan A'Court, England and Liverpool FC footballer
- Jack Aspinwall, Conservative MP for Kingswood from 1979 to 1983 and for Wansdyke from 1983 to 1997
- Dave Bamber, Blackpool, Coventry City footballer
- Alan George Bamford CBE, Principal of Homerton College, Cambridge from 1985 to 1991
- The Right Honourable Lord Burrows, Justice of the Supreme Court of the United Kingdom since 2020, formerly Professor of the Law of England at the University of Oxford
- Kenneth Crook CMG, Ambassador to Afghanistan from 1976 to 1979
- Nicholas Fazackerley, lawyer and MP for Preston in the years 1732-67
- Jacqueline Foster, Conservative MEP for North West England from 1999 to 2004 and 2009 to 2019
- Pete Griffiths, founding member and bassist of punk rock band The Spitfire Boys
- Tony Hazzard, songwriter, session singer and recording artiste
- Prof Graham Hough, Professor of English at the University of Cambridge from 1966 to 1975
- Sue Johnston, actress
- Prof Peter Lawrenson, award-winning electrical engineer, President from 1992 to 1993 of the Institution of Electrical Engineers
- Ian McIntyre, broadcaster and Controller of BBC Radio 4 from 1976 to 1978 and BBC Radio 3 from 1978 to 1987
- Keith Macklin, sports broadcaster and journalist
- Geoff Nulty, Everton FC footballer
- John Parkinson, Professor of Law at Bristol University and promulgator of the concept of stakeholders in corporate law
- Laurence Perkins, principal bassoonist in Manchester Camerata
- John David Pugh, Lib Dem MP for Southport since 2001
- Nigel Roberts, computer scientist
- Stuart Sutcliffe, original bassist for The Beatles and 'Fifth Beatle'
- Sir George Sweeney, former principal of Knowsley Community College; knighted in 2000
- Rt Rev John Waine, former Bishop of Chelmsford from 1986 to 1996
- Prof Sid Watkins, neurosurgeon and Formula One medical advisor
