= Richard Wilson =

Richard Wilson may refer to:

== Academia ==
- Richard Wilson (scholar) (born 1950), British Shakespeare scholar
- Richard Wilson (physicist) (1926–2018), British-born American physicist
- Richard Guy Wilson (born 1940), American architectural historian and University of Virginia faculty member
- Richard K. Wilson (born 1959), American professor of genetics and molecular microbiology
- Richard F. Wilson, American president of Illinois Wesleyan University
- R. M. Wilson (born 1945), American mathematician (combinatorics), professor at Caltech
- Richard Ashby Wilson, American-British social anthropologist

== Arts, literature and music ==
- Richard Wilson (sculptor) (born 1953), British sculptor and musician
- Richard Wilson (author) (1920–1987), American science-fiction writer
- Richard Wilson (painter) (1714–1782), Welsh landscape painter
- Richard L. Wilson (1905–1981), American journalist
- Rich Wilson (journalist), UK-based freelance rock music writer
- Richard Edward Wilson (born 1941), American composer

== Film and television ==
- Richard Wilson (Australian actor) (born 1984), British-born Australian actor
- Richard Wilson (director) (1915–1991), American director and producer involved with Orson Welles' Mercury Theatre and other Hollywood films
- Richard Wilson (Scottish actor) (born 1936), British actor who played the character Victor Meldrew in the sitcom One Foot in the Grave
- Richard Wilson (stage actor) (1744–1796), English stage actor

== Business ==
- Richard Thornton Wilson Jr. (1866–1929), American businessman and prominent figure in horse racing
- Richard Wilson (Australian businessman), Australian businessman, managing director of Melbourne Victory
- Richard Wilson (British businessman) (born 1968), British businessman, CEO of TIGA
- Richard Thornton Wilson (1829–1910), American investment banker

== Military ==
- Richard G. Wilson (1931–1950), American soldier and Medal of Honor recipient
- Richard Wilson (general) (born 1955), Australian general

== Politics ==
- Richard Wilson, Baron Wilson of Dinton (born 1942), British member of the House of Lords and former Cabinet secretary
- Richard Wilson (Irish politician) (died 1957), Irish Farmers' Party politician, 1922–1936
- Richard Wilson (Barnstaple MP) (c. 1750–1815), British member of parliament for Barnstaple, 1796–1802
- Richard Wilson (Ipswich MP) (1759–1834), British member of parliament for Ipswich, 1806–1807
- Richard Fountayne Wilson (1783–1847), British member of parliament for Yorkshire
- Richard B. Wilson (1904–1991), Canadian mayor of Victoria, British Columbia, 1961–1965
- Rick Wilson (Australian politician) (born 1966), Australian member of the House of Representatives
- Rick Wilson (Canadian politician) (born 1950s), Canadian member of the Legislative Assembly of Alberta
- Rick Wilson, candidate in the United States House of Representatives elections in Michigan, 2010
- Rick Wilson (political consultant) (born 1963), American Republican political strategist and media consultant known as one of the co-founders of The Lincoln Project

== Sports ==
- Rick Wilson (basketball) (born 1956), American basketball player
- Richard Wilson (cricketer) (1869–?), Australian cricketer
- Richard Wilson (footballer, born 1956), New Zealand football goalkeeper
- Richard Wilson (footballer, born 1960), English football player
- Rick Wilson (racing driver) (born 1953), American NASCAR driver
- Rick Wilson (ice hockey) (born 1950), Canadian ice hockey player
- Rick Wilson (jockey) (born 1953), American jockey
- Rick Wilson (wrestler) (1965–1999), American professional wrestler best known as "the Renegade" in World Championship Wrestling
- Richard Wilson (rugby union) (born 1953), New Zealand rugby union player
- Richard Wilson (sailor) (born 1950), American sailor

== See also ==
- Dick Wilson (disambiguation)
- Ricky Wilson (disambiguation)
- Richard C. Willson, American chemical and biomolecular engineer, professor at University of Houston
