= Shakespeare North =

Auditorium in Merseyside, England

Coordinates: 53.4291°N 2.8057°W

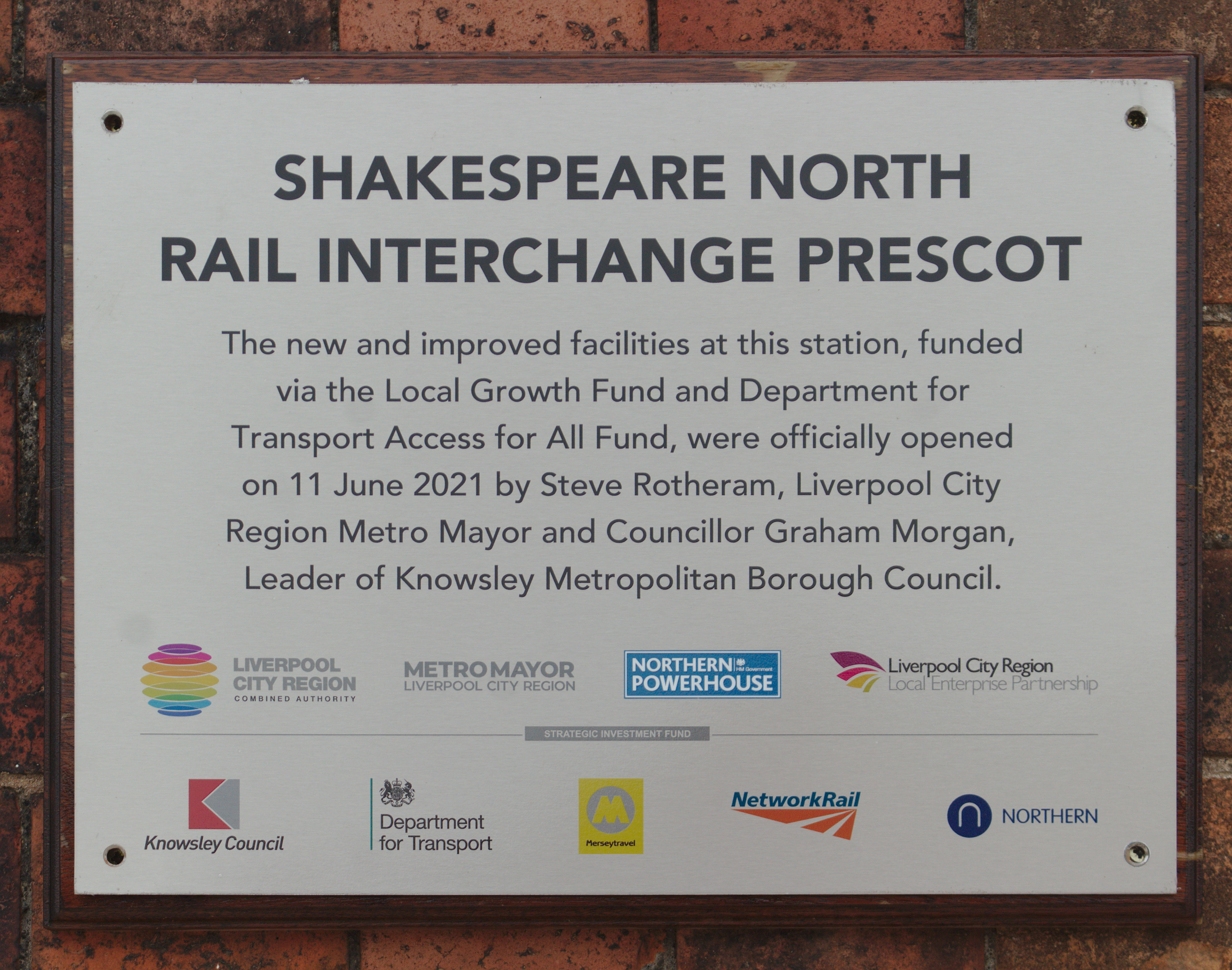

The Shakespeare North Playhouse in Prescot, Merseyside, in the north of England, is a cultural and educational venue that opened in 2022. The development includes a 420-seat main auditorium, a modern studio space, outdoor performance garden, exhibition and visitor centre. The theatre opened on 15 July 2022.

== Shakespeare North Trust ==
The Shakespeare North Trust was founded by Richard Wilson and David Thacker. Its patron is Edward Stanley, 19th Earl of Derby. In 2007 it submitted a £20 million National Lottery bid to fund the complex, but was unsuccessful.

== Playhouse ==
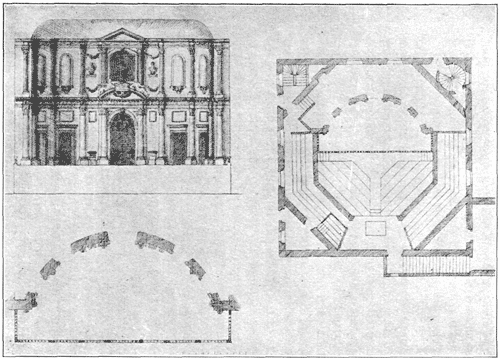
The 1629 plan of the Cockpit-in-Court

In April 2016, Knowsley Metropolitan Borough Council granted planning permission for the playhouse. Funding is being provided by the council, the Liverpool City Region Combined Authority and a governmental contribution of £5 million was announced in the 2016 Budget, with other funding to be provided by private investors. The widow of comedian Ken Dodd provided £700,000 in funding to the theatre to create an outdoor performance garden.

The historical Prescot Playhouse, the inspiration behind the project, existed between the mid-1590s and 1609, probably on Eccleston Street. No architectural plans of that theatre survive, however. The new theatre's layout is based on the 1629 design by Inigo Jones for the Cockpit-in-Court theatre in the Palace of Whitehall, London. The architects are Helm Architecture and Austin-Smith:Lord. The lead artist is Simon Watkinson.

== Educational centre ==
Shakespeare North Playhouse will have an educational centre that will offer opportunities for life-long learning.

== Location ==
The four-storey complex was built on the site of Mill Street car park, to the north of Prescot Parish Church. Knowsley Council and the Earl of Derby provided land for the complex.
