= Chapel of Our Lady Help of Christians =

There are several chapels and churches dedicated to Our Lady Help of Christians

- Our Lady Help of Christians Church, Luton, Bedfordshire, UK
- Our Lady Help of Christians and St Helen's Church, Westcliff-on-Sea, Essex, UK
- Our Lady Help of Christians Church, Blackheath, London, UK
- Our Lady Help of Christians Church, Portico, Merseyside, UK
- Our Lady Help of Christians Chapel (Cheektowaga, New York), United States
- Church of Our Lady Help of Christians (Staten Island, New York), United States
