= Cockpit-in-Court =

London theatre

Coordinates: 51°30′14″N 0°7′35″W

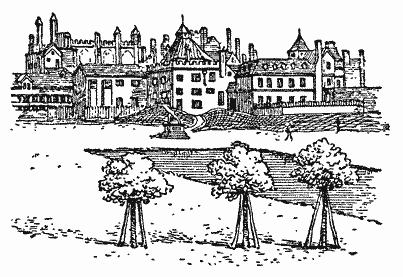
Cockpit-in-Court from an engraving by Mazell in Pennant's London, reproduced in the London Topographical Record (1903)

The Cockpit-in-Court (also known as the Royal Cockpit) was an early theatre in London, located at the Palace of Whitehall, next to St. James's Park, now the site of 70 Whitehall, in Westminster.

The structure was originally built by Henry VIII, after he had acquired Cardinal Wolsey's York Place to the north of the Palace of Westminster, following the Cardinal's downfall in 1529. It was one of a number of new pleasure buildings constructed for King Henry's entertainment, including a real tennis court, a bowling alley, and a tiltyard, and was used as an actual cockpit; that is, an area for staging cockfighting. Thus enlarged, the Palace of Whitehall became the main London residence of the Tudor and Stuart Kings of England, and the Palace of Westminster was relegated to ceremonial and administrative purposes only.

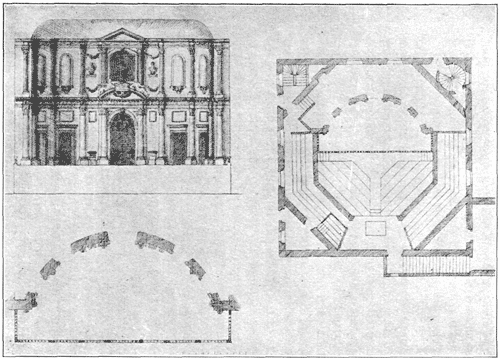
Inigo Jones plans for the Cockpit-in-Court

The Cockpit ceased to be used for cockfighting in Jacobean times, and was used instead as a private theatre and as chambers for members of the Royal Household. It was redesigned in 1629 for Charles I by Inigo Jones as a private venue for staging court masques. It was the second cockpit that Jones had redesigned as a theatre, the other being the Cockpit Theatre in Drury Lane, which was renovated after a fire in 1617.

After the London theatre closure of the Interregnum, the Cockpit returned to use under Charles II, and was refitted in 1662. A new dressing room was added for female players, whose presence onstage was a recent theatrical innovation; its walls were decorated with green baize, one possible origin of the theatrical term "green room" for a dressing room. Samuel Pepys records attending several plays at the Cockpit in his diary.

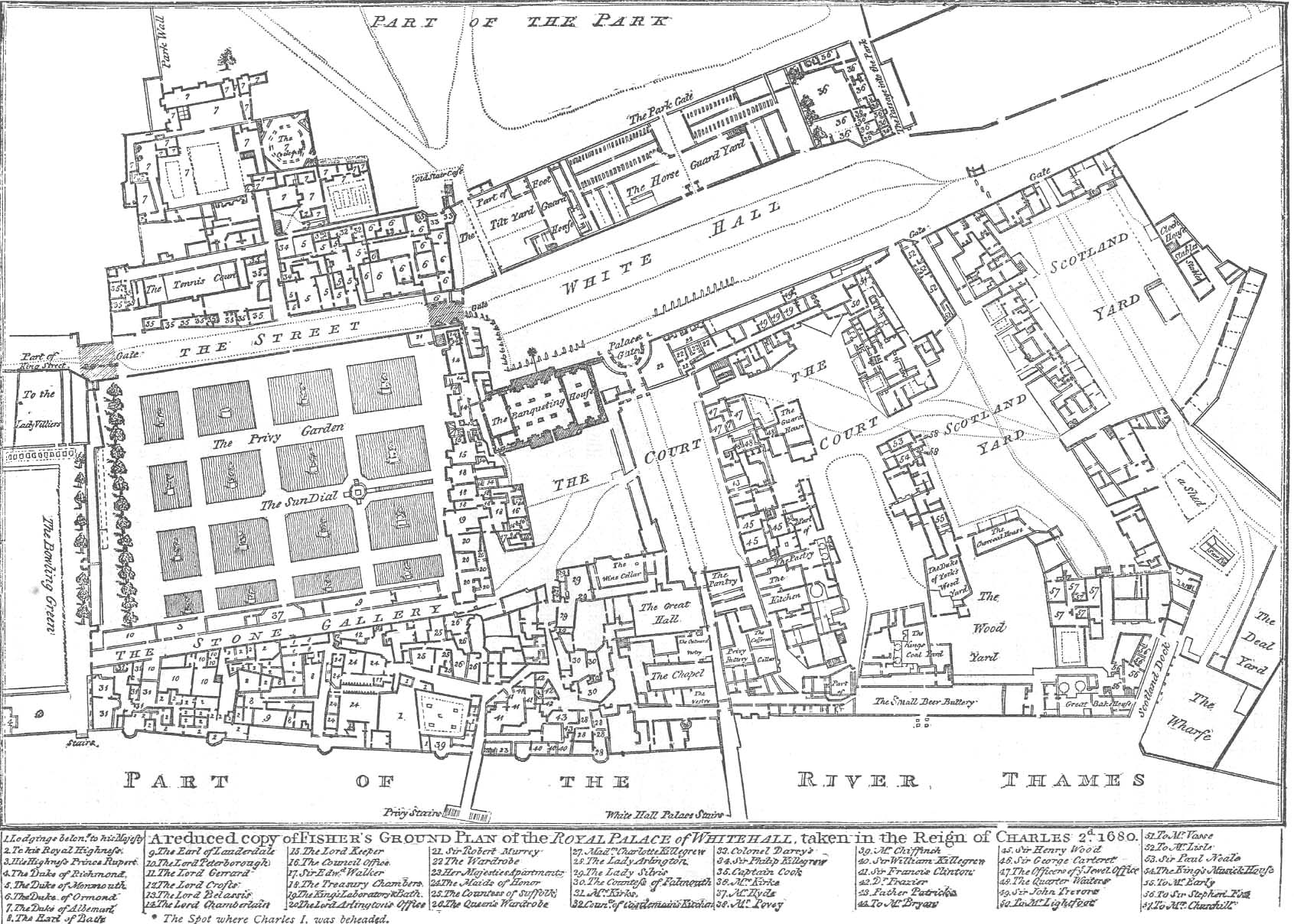
A retrospective plan of Whitehall Palace as it was in 1680, by Fisher. The Cockpit is the hexagonal building near the top left corner. The Banqueting House is just to the left of the centre. Whitehall follows the line of the road marked "White Hall" from the right and continues through the west side of the Privy Garden. North is at the top.

In 1680, it was occupied by Christopher Monck, 2nd Duke of Albemarle in his official capacity as Master of the Great Wardrobe, and later by Ralph, 1st Duke of Montagu in the same capacity.

Charles II gave the Cockpit to Princess Anne, daughter of Charles's brother James, Duke of York, in 1683. Anne and her closest friend, Sarah, Lady Churchill escaped from here, facing imminent arrest, at the beginning of the Glorious Revolution; both their husbands, Prince George of Denmark and John, Baron Churchill switched their allegiances from James II to William of Orange. Sarah and Anne fled to Nottingham shortly afterwards. The Palace of Whitehall was almost completely destroyed by fire in 1698. In addition to the prominent Banqueting House, also designed by Jones in 1619, the Cockpit also survived the fire. William III then moved his London residence to nearby St James's Palace, and the site was rebuilt to be used as government offices, and residential and commercial premises. The Cockpit was used to house government officials. It was first occupied by HM Treasury, whose offices elsewhere in the palace had been destroyed, until the Treasury moved to a new building on Horse Guards Road in 1734.

When Anne became queen after the death of William in 1702, she gave the residence to the loyal Churchills, now Duke and Duchess of Marlborough. They vacated the residence during Anne's reign and it housed the Treasury. After the Treasury moved, it was used in the late 18th century by the Foreign Office, after that government office had been founded at Cleveland Row, St James's but before it moved to Downing Street. Next, it was used by the Privy Council as a council chamber, for judicial purposes. It continued to be used by the Privy Council after a new chamber was built for them in 1827. The current building on the site, at 70 Whitehall, is used by the Cabinet Office. The reconstructed Cockpit Passage in 70 Whitehall runs along the edge of the old tennis courts and into Kent's Treasury, built on the site of the original cockpit lodgings. The minstrel's gallery on the ground floor is currently decorated with pictures of fighting cocks and a model of the old Whitehall palace.

It should not be confused with Cockpit Steps nearby in St James Park, which lead up from Birdcage Walk past the site of a royal cockpit in Old Queen Street.

== Reconstructions ==
A replica theatre based on Inigo Jones' 1629 plan of the Cockpit-in-Court is part of the Shakespeare North complex in Prescot, Merseyside. The historical Prescot Playhouse, the inspiration behind the project, existed between the mid-1590s and 1609, but no plans of it survive.

== See also ==
- List of English Renaissance theatres
