= George Sweeney =

George Sweeney may refer to:

- George Clinton Sweeney (1895–1966), United States federal judge
- George Sweeney (actor), British television and film actor
- George Sweeney (politician), former politician in Newfoundland and Labrador, Canada
- George Sweeney (educator) (born 1946), British educator
- The George Sweeney Trial of 1806 in Richmond, Virginia, a murder trial
