= John Parkinson =

John Parkinson is the name of:

- John Parkinson (botanist) (1567–1650), English herbalist
- John Parkinson (architect) (1861–1935), English architect in Los Angeles
- John Parkinson (politician) (1870–1941), British Labour Party MP for Wigan, 1918–1941
- John Parkinson (cardiologist) (1885–1976), English cardiologist, a namesake of Wolff-Parkinson-White syndrome
- John Edward Parkinson (1955–2004), British academic in UK company law
- John Parkinson (footballer) (1944–2025), Australian rules footballer

== See also ==
- Jack Parkinson (disambiguation)
