= Dick Wilson (disambiguation) =

Dick Wilson (1916–2007) was a British-born Canadian-American character actor.

Dick Wilson may also refer to:

- Dick Wilson (golf course architect) (1904–1965), American golf course architect
- Dick Wilson (musician) (1911–1941), American saxophonist
- Dick Wilson (tribal chairman) (1934–1990), president of the Oglala Sioux Tribe of the Pine Ridge Reservation, 1972–1976
- Dick Wilson (writer) (1928–2011), English journalist and writer
- Dick Wilson (wrestler) (1933–2008), American Olympic wrestler
- Dick Wilson (rugby league) (died 2000), Australian rugby league player

== See also ==
- Richard Wilson (disambiguation)
