= Our Lady Immaculate and St Joseph Church, Prescot =

Church of Our Lady Immaculate and St Joseph
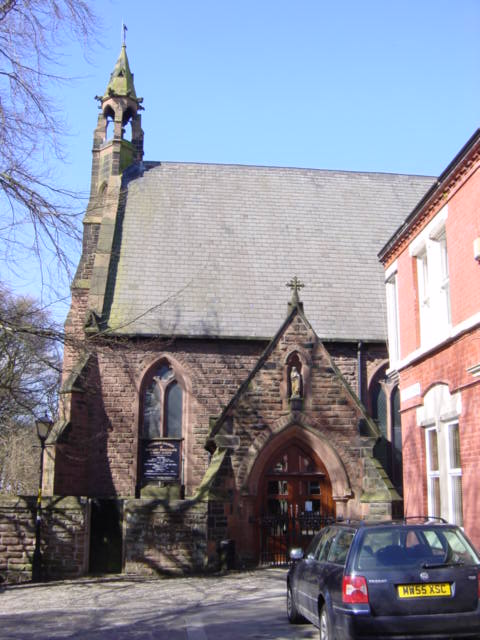
- Front Entrance

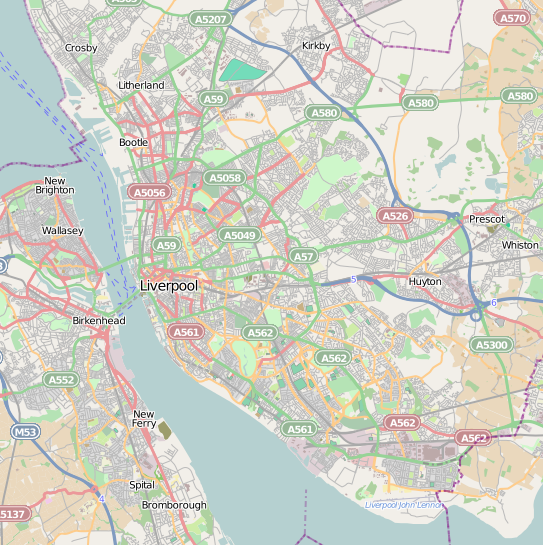
- Location in Merseyside
- 53.4285°N 2.8079°W
- OS grid reference: SJ 46413 92711
- Location: Prescot, Merseyside
- Country: England
- Denomination: Roman Catholic
- Website: https://www.ourladystjoseph-prescot.co.uk/

History
- Status: Active
- Founder: Society of Jesus
- Dedication: St Mary and Saint Joseph

Architecture
- Functional status: Parish church
- Heritage designation: Grade II listed
- Designated: 19 March 1987
- Architect: Joseph Aloysius Hansom
- Style: Gothic Revival
- Groundbreaking: 1856
- Completed: 1857; 169 years ago

Administration
- Province: Liverpool
- Archdiocese: Liverpool

Our Lady Immaculate and St Joseph Church is a Roman Catholic parish church in Prescot, Merseyside. It was built in 1856-57 by the Society of Jesus, and is now in the Knowsley deanery of the Archdiocese of Liverpool. It is a Grade II listed building, designed by Joseph Aloysius Hansom, and is next to the Church of St Mary on Vicarage Place in the centre of Prescot.

== History ==
=== Origin ===
From the English Reformation until 1857, the Catholic population of Prescot had to travel to an area of the town called Portico, two miles from the town centre. From 1790, there was Our Lady Help of Christians Church. The Catholics were so numerous, that in 1583 the Bishop of Chester, William Chaderton, wrote to the Privy Council:

Truly the Papists in these parts are lately growing so stubborn and contemptuous that in my opinion it were very requisite that their Lordships did write a very earnest letter to my good Lord the Earl of Derby, myself, and the rest of Her Majesty's Commissioners ... to deal seriously and roundly with them (the Papists of Prescot) otherwise there can be no reformation.

=== Construction ===
In 1856, six years after the restoration of the English Catholic hierarchy and the creation of the Archdiocese of Liverpool, the Jesuits founded a church in the centre of Prescot and asked Joseph Aloysius Hansom to design it for them. He also designed Church of St. Walburge in Preston, St Joseph's Church in Leigh, St Beuno's Ignatian Spirituality Centre in Tremeirchion and the Church of the Holy Name of Jesus in Manchester for the Jesuits. The building was opened for worship a year later.

=== Handover ===
On 28 September 1932, the church was taken into the care of the Archdiocese of Liverpool. At the time, many churches served by the Jesuits were being given to their respective dioceses. Within the same year both Holy Cross Church in St Helens, Merseyside and St John's Church in Wigan were handed over to the archdiocese.

== Parish ==
The church has a Mass at 6:00pm on Saturday evening for Sunday and another Mass at 11:00am Sunday morning. There are weekday Masses at 12.00pm on Monday, Wednesday, Friday and Saturday.

Both the Our Lady of Help of Christians and Our Lady Immaculate and St Joseph churches have a relationship with Our Lady's Primary School in Prescot, whose mission statement states ' What we hoped to achieve in all that we do is as a living community of God'.

== Gallery ==
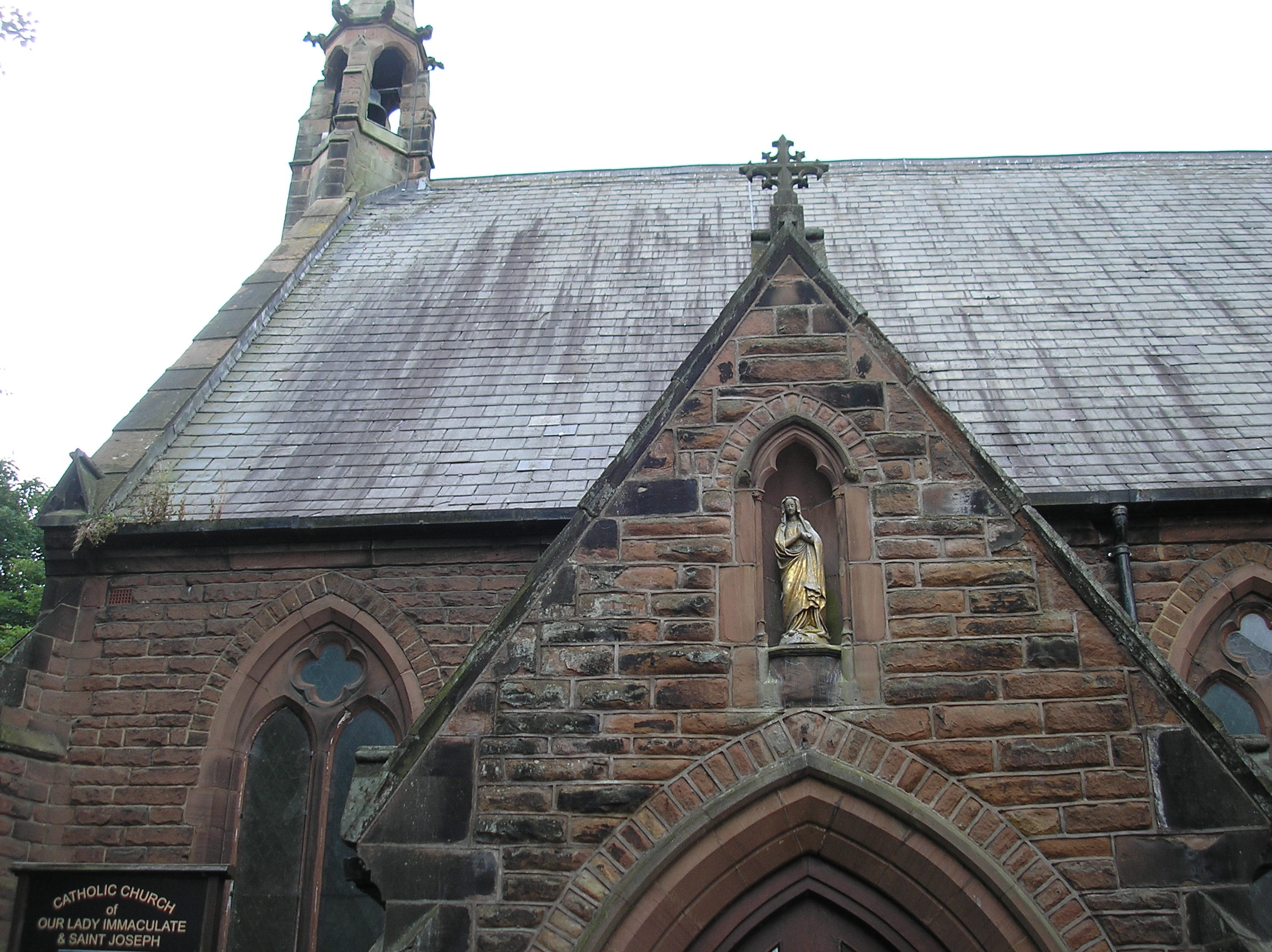
Doorway

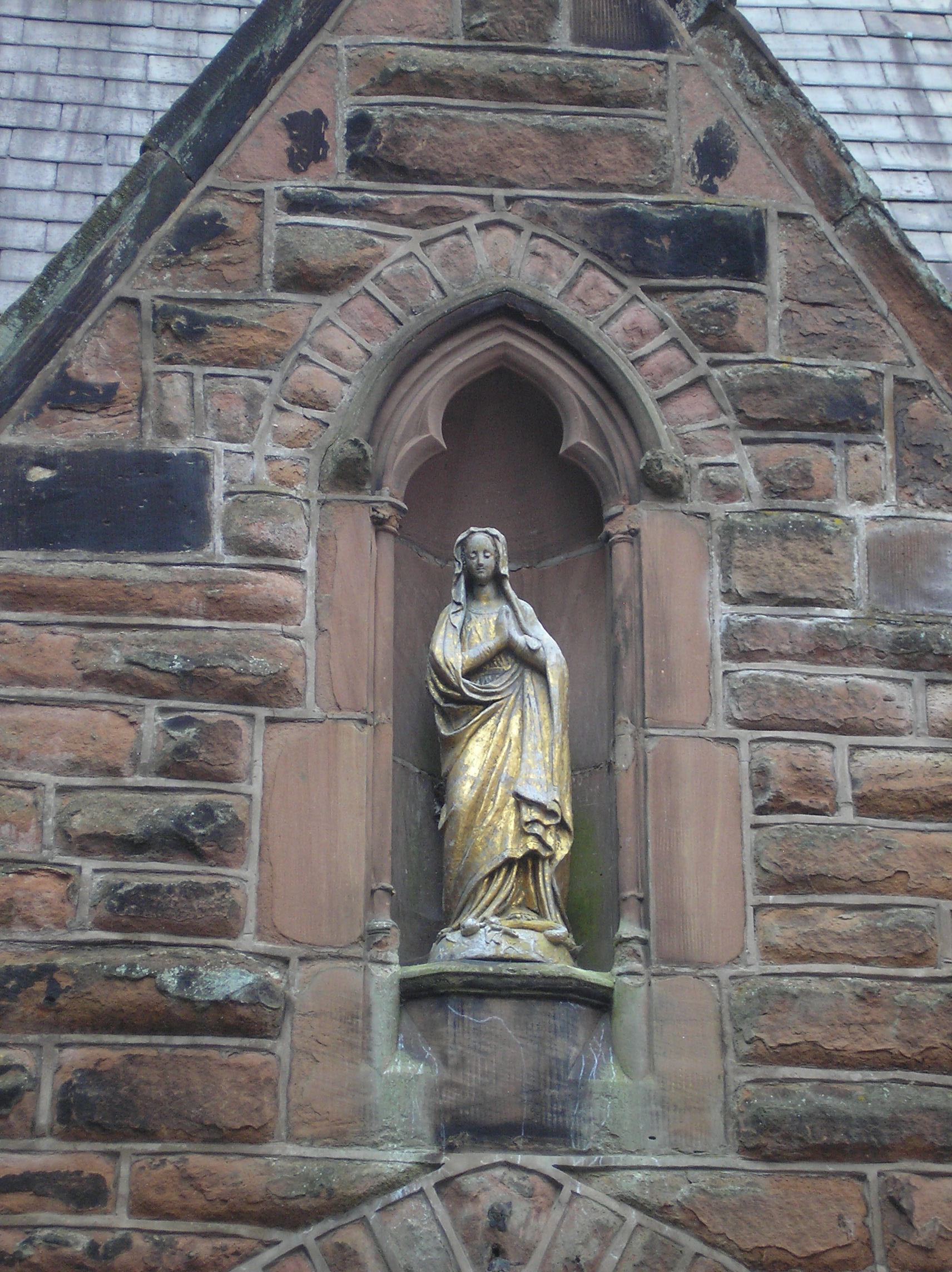
Statue above doorway

== See also ==
- Listed buildings in Prescot
- Society of Jesus
- Our Lady Help of Christians Church, Portico
