= Listed buildings in Prescot =

Prescot is a civil parish in Knowsley, Merseyside, England. It contains 25 buildings that are recorded in the National Heritage List for England as designated listed buildings. Of these, one is listed at Grade I, the highest of the three grades, and the others are at Grade II, the lowest grade. The parish contains the town of Prescot, which from the middle of the 18th century to the middle of the 19th century was of national importance as a centre of the watch-making industry. This industry is reflected in some of the listed buildings that include workshops, some of which are detached and some are integrated into houses. There is also a large former watch-making factory, and the town's museum (which is itself listed) contains a reconstructed watchmaker's workshop. The other listed buildings include houses and associated structures, a public house, a former cinema, and two churches.

== Key ==
Grade	Criteria
I	Buildings of exceptional interest, sometimes considered to be internationally important
II*	Particularly important buildings of more than special interest
II	Buildings of national importance and special interest

== Buildings ==
Name and location	Photograph	Date	Notes	Grade
St Mary's Church; 53.42838°N 2.80623°W		Medieval (possibly)	The oldest fabric is in the chancel and the north vestry, the nave dates from 1610, the steeple from 1729, the aisles from 1817 to 1819, and the south vestry from 1900. The church is built in sandstone and consists of a nave with clerestory, aisles, a chancel with north and south vestries, and a west steeple. The tower contains clock faces and has a balustraded parapet with three finials on each angle. On the spire are three tiers of lucarnes.	I
21–23 Eccleston Street; 53.42898°N 2.80474°W	—	Late 16th to early 17th century	A pair of shops with residential accommodation above. They have a timber framed core on a sandstone foundation, later encased in brick, and a double-pitched slate roof. There are two storeys and three bays. In the ground floor are two reproduction 19th-century shop fronts with decorated scroll brackets, and the upper floor contains three sash windows with segmental heads.	II
30 Eccleston Street; 53.42908°N 2.80397°W		17th century	A timber-framed shop in two storeys with a two-bay front. The ground floor contains a modern shop front. The upper storey is gabled, the right gable being original and the left gable a 20th-century copy. The windows are 20th-century casements.	II
9 Market Place with workshop 53.42830°N 2.80498°W	—	17th century (possible)	The workshop is at the rear and consists of a rectangular stone single-storey building that is thought to be the first free-standing watchmaker's workshop in the town. In front is a shop from the early 19th century, built in rendered brick with a slate roof. It is in three storeys with a shop front and a house doorway in the ground floor, and two sash windows in each floor above. At the top of the building is a cornice and a parapet with a shaped centre.	II
10 Vicarage Place; 53.42844°N 2.80752°W	—	Mid-18th century	A brick house on a stone base with stone dressings and cornice. It is in three storeys and has a four-bay front. The entrance is in the second bay and it has panelled pilasters and a pediment. The windows are sashes. In front of the house is a wall with ornate iron railings, square iron gate piers, and a gate, which are included in the listing.	II
Breck Cottage; 53.42794°N 2.81335°W	—	18th century	A roughcast house with a slate roof in two storeys with a five-bay front. The second bay projects forward and is gabled, and the entrance is under a lean-to porch in the first bay. Most of the windows are sashes.	II
11 High Street; 53.42979°N 2.80545°W		Late 18th century	Formerly the Conservative Club, the building is in brick with stone dressings and has a slate roof. It is in three storeys, and has a five-bay front. The central entrance is round-headed, and has a doorcase with Doric half-columns, a fluted frieze and a pediment. The windows are sashes with wedge lintels. The wall in front of the building and the gate piers are included in the listing.	II
2 Vicarage Place; 53.42848°N 2.80691°W	—	Late 18th century	A brick house with on a stone base with stone dressings, in three storeys and with a single-bay front. The windows are sashes, those in the top floor being horizontally-sliding. The entrance has panelled pilasters and a pediment.	II
4 Vicarage Place; 53.42846°N 2.80708°W	—	Late 18th century	A brick house with on a stone base with stone dressings, in three storeys and with a five-bay front. The windows are sashes, and most have wedge lintels. The central entrance is round-headed and has a Doric doorcase with flat pilasters and an open pediment.	II
6 Vicarage Place; 53.42845°N 2.80738°W	—	Late 18th century	A brick house with on a stone base with stone dressings, in two storeys and with a two-bay front. The windows are sashes with wedge lintels. The entrance is round-headed and has a Doric doorcase with flat pilasters and an open pediment.	II
14 Vicarage Place; 53.42849°N 2.80768°W	—	Late 18th century	A brick house with stone dressings and a slate roof. It is in two storeys and has a gabled one-bay front to the street, and two bays along the sides. The windows are sashes with wedge lintels. It was the servants' house to No. 10.	II
34 Church Street; 53.42925°N 2.80646°W		1776	Originating as a house, and at one time a bank and a museum, it is built in brick on a stone base with stone dressings. The building is in three storeys and has a five-bay front, the middle three bays projecting forward under a pediment. The central doorway has flat pilasters and a pediment, and the windows are sashes. There are later extensions to the right side and the rear. Retained in the house are the bank's strong rooms.	II
17 Atherton Street; 53.42988°N 2.80339°W	—	c. 1790	A brick house with a Welsh slate roof, part of a terrace. It is in three storeys and has a two-bay front containing a shop front and sash windows. At the rear in the middle storey is an integrated watchmaker's workshop with a 30-pane window.	II
37 High Street; 53.43023°N 2.80370°W	—	c. 1815	A brick house on a stone base with stone dressings and cornice. It is in two storeys and has a two-bay front. The windows are sashes, those in the lower floor having wedge lintels. The entrance is round-headed and has roll moulding and impost blocks.	II
2 Derby Street; 53.42955°N 2.80696°W	—	Early 19th century	A purpose-built solicitors' office, it is stuccoed on a stone base and has a hipped slate roof. The office is in a single storey and has a three-bay front, the central bay being bowed. On the right side is a projecting porch with a frieze, cornice and gable, and the entrance has an architrave. The windows are sashes.	II
44–50 Derby Street; 53.42929°N 2.81163°W	—	Early 19th century	A terrace of four brick houses with concrete dressings and slate roofs that were rebuilt in 1985. They are in two storeys and have a four-bay front. The windows are sashes; on the front they have wedge lintels, and at the back they are horizontally-sliding.	II
Stable block, 54 Derby Street; 53.42945°N 2.81187°W	—	Early 19th century	The former stables are in brick with stone dressings and a slate roof. They consist of four bays with two storeys and, to the left, two bays in a single storey. The building contains openings including a cart entrance and sash windows.	II
Masonic Hall; 53.42956°N 2.80626°W	—	Early 19th century	The former Masonic Hall has later been used as offices. It is built in brick with stone dressings and has a slate roof. The building is in two storeys and has a three-bay front. The central porch has Doric columns, an Ionic entablature, glazed infill with colonettes, a cornice, and a fanlight. The windows are sashes with wedge lintels, and one has an architrave.	II
Clock Face public house and 52 Derby Street; 53.42922°N 2.81193°W		c. 1830	A public house and attached house in two storeys, the main face of the public house is a right angles to the road. It is faced in red sandstone and has five irregular bays. The projecting porch is carried on Ionic columns, to the left of it is a canted bay window, and above it is a parapet decorated with wreathes and acroteria. The windows are sashes. The street face is in brick, has three irregular bays, and a Doric doorcase with a large fanlight. To the right of this is a lower two-bay brick house (No. 52).	II
48 and 50 St Helens Road; 53.43187°N 2.80057°W	—	1837	A pair of houses, forming part of a terrace, pebbledashed with stone dressings and a felted slate roof. They are in two storeys and have a front of three bays. Between the two entrances is an entry to the rear. The entrances and windows have wedge lintels; the windows are casements. At the rear are two former watchmakers' galleries, that of No. 48 being intact, with horizontally-sliding sash windows.	II
Church of Our Lady Immaculate; 53.42841°N 2.80789°W		1856–57	A Roman Catholic church designed by Joseph Hansom, it is built in stone with a slate roof. The church consists of a nave without aisles, shallow transepts and a chancel. On the west gable are gargoyles and a short spire surmounted by an iron cross.	II
Workshop, 20 Grosvenor Road; 53.43046°N 2.80023°W	—	Late 19th century	A detached watchmaker's workshop in brick with a slate roof. It is in two storeys, and has a canted corner. On each longer side are two six-pane windows. On the end of the building is a taking-in door in the upper storey.	II
Former watch making factory 53.42945°N 2.79748°W	—	1889–90	Built for the Lancashire Watch Company and designed by Scott and Sons, this part of the factory has an exposed iron frame filled with brick and glazing. Inside, the floors are concrete. The front extends for 300 feet (91 m), has 43 bays, and is in three storeys. At the top is a parapet and a moulded cornice.	II
Former Picture Palace Cinema; 53.42777°N 2.80440°W		1912	A pair of 19th-century houses converted into a cinema, later used for other purposes. It is in stuccoed brick on a steel and concrete frame with a slate roof. The building consists of the cinema and two ranges to the right. The cinema has three storeys and three bays. In the ground floor is a central entrance flanked by round-arched windows, over which is a moulded string course. The upper floors have corner quoins and pilasters. The windows in the middle floor have architraves, the central window with a semicircular pediment, and the outer windows with decorated friezes. In the top floor, the outer windows are square, and the central window is circular with keystones and surrounded by a garland. Above is a balustraded parapet, and a central segmental-headed panel containing a cartouche. At the rear is a two-storey seven-bay auditorium. The first range to the right has three storeys and two bays, and the second range has two storeys and one bay and contains shop windows.	II
War Memorial; 53.42821°N 2.80598°W		1916	The war memorial was re-dedicated in 1946. It is in Aberdeen granite and polished granite. The base is square and each face contains an inscribed granite plaque. Rising from the base is a banded and rusticated column with a triglyph frieze at the top and bottom. Standing on the column is a statue of a soldier from the South Lancashire Regiment holding a rifle.	II
