= Prescot Town Council =

Local authority for Prescot, Merseyside, England

Type
- Type: Town council

Leadership
- Mayor: Cllr Paul Goodwin, Liberal Democrats since 28 May 2026

Structure
- Seats: 12 councillors
- Political groups: All parties (12) Green (6) Liberal Democrats (5) Labour (1)
- Length of term: 4 years

Elections
- Voting system: First-past-the-post
- Last election: 4 May 2023
- Next election: May 2027

Meeting place
- Prescot Town Hall, Prescot

Website
- www.prescot-tc.gov.uk

Prescot Town Council is the town council for the town and civil parish of Prescot in Knowsley, Merseyside, England. The Town Council has existed in its current form since the Local Elections of May 1983.

== Wards and Councillors ==
The Township of Prescot comprises two political wards, Prescot North and Prescot South, represented by seven and five councillors respectively. The Town Council holds elections every fours years, with all seats up for election. The most recent election was held in May 2023; following this and a subsequent by-election, the current set of councillors is:

Ward	Councillor	Party	Current Term
North	Mark Burke	Liberal Democrats	2023–27
North	Jayne Edgar	Labour	2023–27
North	Paul Goodwin	Liberal Democrats	2024–27
North	Paul Shaw	Green	2023–27
North	Ian Smith	Liberal Democrats	2023–27
North	Marjorie Sommerfield	Liberal Democrats	2023–27
North	Frances Wynn	Liberal Democrats	2023–27
South	Joanne Burke	Green	2023–27
South	Pat Cook	Green	2023–27
South	Tracey Murray	Green	2023–27
South	Thomas Smith	Green	2023–27
South	Graham Wickens	Green	2023–27
