= Prescot reservoirs =

Coordinates: 53°26′19″N 2°47′57″W

In 1857 two small holding reservoirs were built in Prescot to receive water from the Rivington reservoirs. These held sufficient water to supply Liverpool for two days. In 1892 water from Lake Vyrnwy supplemented the water stored in Prescot. Four smaller reservoirs were built with a capacity of 200 million gallons, sufficient to supply Liverpool for four days.

Today, so much water is abstracted from Rivington for use in Lancashire that the flow is reversed and water from Vyrnwy is used to supply towns in Lancashire.
