= Ricky Wilson =

Ricky Wilson may refer to:

- Ricky Wilson (guitarist) (1953–1985), American guitarist of the B-52's
- Ricky Wilson (basketball) (born 1964), American basketball player
- Ricky Wilson (singer) (born 1978), British singer of Kaiser Chiefs

== See also ==
- Richard Wilson (disambiguation)
