= Jack Parkinson =

Jack Parkinson may refer to:

- Jack Parkinson (basketball) (1924–1997), American professional basketball player
- Jack Parkinson (footballer, born 1883), English forward for Liverpool
- Jack Parkinson (footballer, born 1869), English forward for Blackpool

== See also ==
- John Parkinson (disambiguation)
