= John Parkinson (lawyer) =

British legal academic (1955–2004)

John Edward Parkinson (19 March 1955 – 19 February 2004) was Professor of Law at Bristol University and a key member of the Company Law Review Steering Group which worked towards the Companies Act 2006. He died prematurely at age 48, following a short illness. He was born in Prescot, Merseyside and educated at Prescot Grammar School and Brasenose College, Oxford. He graduated as joint top of his year, also winning the Martin Wronker University Prize for Law.

== Career ==
Parkinson worked briefly for city law firm Freshfields Bruckhaus Deringer before moving to Bristol to teach.

Parkinson rose to real prominence with the publication of his book, Corporate Power and Responsibility: Issues in the Theory of Company Law (1993). This book was unique in British scholarship for addressing the theoretical debates and engaging in the economic arguments in company law from a progressive perspective. The message of the work was that company law needs to take account of the range of stakeholders, other than shareholders, who are affected by modern corporations. In 1994 he won the Society of Public Teachers of Law's book prize for outstanding legal scholarship by a younger scholar.

== Publications ==
Books

- Corporate Power and Responsibility: Issues in the Theory of Company Law (1993)

Articles

- JE Parkinson, 'Disclosure and Corporate Social and Environmental Performance: Competitiveness and Enterprise in a Broader Social Frame' (2003) 3 Journal of Corporate Law Studies 3
