= Prescot Town Hall =

Municipal building in Prescot, Merseyside, England

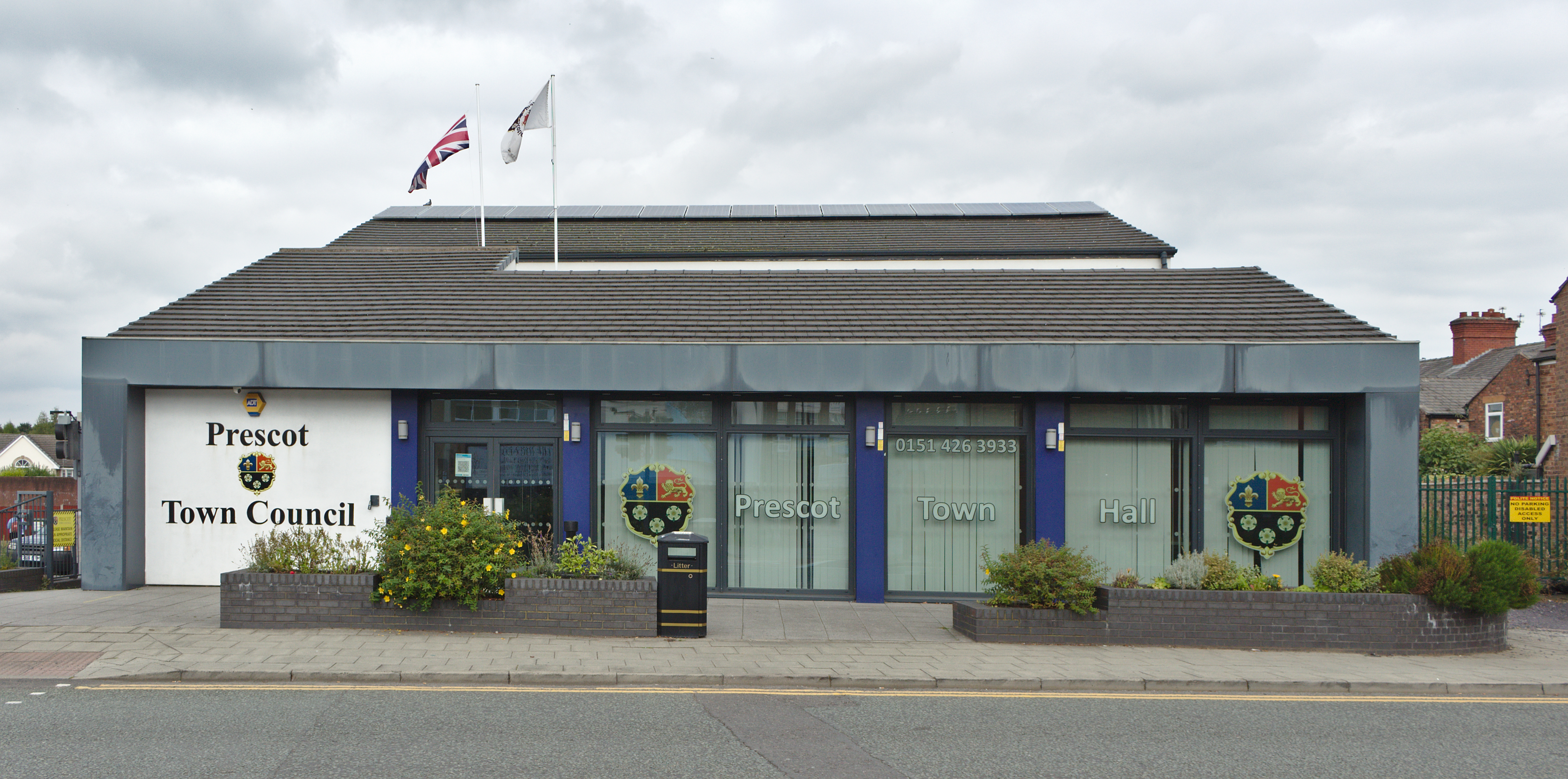
- The building in 2021

- Shown in Merseyside
- 53.4304°N 2.8020°W
- Location: Warrington Road, Prescot

History
- Built: 2014

Site notes
- Architectural style: Modern style

Prescot Town Hall is a municipal building in Warrington Road, Prescot, a town in Merseyside, England. The building is currently used as the offices and meeting place of Prescot Town Council.

== History ==
=== The first town hall ===
The first municipal building in the town was a tollbooth on the west side of the Market Place which may have dated back to the founding of the market in the 14th century. It was rebuilt in 1551 and then demolished in the mid-18th century to make way for a new town hall, which was to be financed by public subscription. Two foundation stones were laid, one of behalf of the local freemasons and the other on behalf of the lord of the manor, on 29 May 1755. The new three-storey building was designed in the Renaissance Revival style, built in red brick and was completed in the late 1750s.

The design involved an asymmetrical main frontage of three bays facing onto the Market Place with a distinctive apse at the southern end. The ground floor was fenestrated by shop fronts, while the first floor was fenestrated by four small sash windows, and the second floor was fenestrated by a Venetian window flanked by a pair of sash windows with triangular pediments. Internally, there were four shops on the ground floor, additional accommodation for the shops on the first floor and an assembly room for public use on the second floor.

The court leet, which managed the town, met in the town hall but the local board of health, established in 1867, and the urban district council, which replaced it in 1894, were based in offices in Derby Road. After becoming dilapidated, the old town hall was demolished in 1964. The Derby Road offices ceased to be the local seat of government when the enlarged Knowsley Metropolitan Borough Council was formed in 1974.

=== The current building ===
The current building was commissioned by Boddingtons as a public house in the late 1970s. The site had previously been occupied by another public house, the King's Arms. The new building was designed in the modern style, built in red brick and was officially opened as the Lancashire Fusilier in April 1981. The design involved a two-storey block with a pitched roof at the rear, and a single-storey lean-to at the front, which allowed the slope of the pitched roof to continue downwards; the lean-to was fenestrated by two oriel windows. The main entrance was on the St Helens Road frontage. Following a refurbishment in the early 1980s, the public house was rebranded as The Fusilier. The name recalled the volunteers of the 5th Battalion, South Lancashire Regiment, recruited and trained in the local area, who were deployed to the Western Front in February 1915 during the First World War and who saw action in the trenches under the instruction of the Lancashire Fusiliers.

Prescot Town Council was established in 1974, with offices in Prescot Leisure Centre. After the centre was demolished in 2011, the town council purchased The Fusilier, for use as a new town hall. The contract was initially awarded to one contractor, Whittaker, but the company went bankrupt in 2013, and was replaced by another contractor, Carefoot. The conversion was completed at a cost of £750,000 and the building re-opened in 2014. The lean-to was given a new glazed front, and the interior of the complex accommodated a reception area, function room, bar and kitchen. There were meeting rooms and offices for the council on the first floor. Several of the rooms were subsequently made available to the public for concerts and other community events.
