= Corporate Power and Responsibility =

1993 book by J.E. Parkinson

Corporate Power and Responsibility: Issues in the Theory of Company Law (1993) is a seminal book in UK company law by J.E. Parkinson. Its focus is corporate governance from a progressive perspective which charts the flaws and maps the reforms needed to match the responsibility modern corporations have to their responsibility.

== Contents ==
1. Corporate power
2. Ownership, control and the pursuit of profit
3. The legal control of management discretion
4. Managerial efficiency
5. Reinforcing and challenging the legal model
6. Corporate governance: shareholder democracy and the monitoring board
7. Management self dealing
8. The enforcement of directors' duties
9. Social responsibility within the current legal fabric
10. An evaluation of profit sacrificing social responsibility
11. Strengthening the constraints
12. The democratic imperative: beyond social responsibility

== See also ==
- Globalization

== Literature ==
- Adolf Berle and Gardiner Means, The Modern Corporation and Private Property (1932)
- Brian Cheffins, Company law: Theory, Structure and Operation (1998)
