= George Sweeney (educator) =

Retired British educator

Sir George Sweeney (born 26 January 1946) is a retired British educator.

Educated at Prescot Boys' Grammar School and Hull University (graduating firstly with a Bachelor of Arts degree in 1967 and then a Master of Arts degree in 1973), Sweeney began teaching in 1967; in 1983, he became Vice Principal at Grimsby College of Technology. In 1990, he became Principal of Knowsley Community College, and retired in 2007. He was knighted in the 2000 Birthday Honours and was awarded an honorary Doctor of Education degree by the University of Chester in 2008.
