= Our Lady Help of Christians Church, Portico =

Coordinates: 53.434175°N 2.777810°W

Our Lady Help of Christians Church
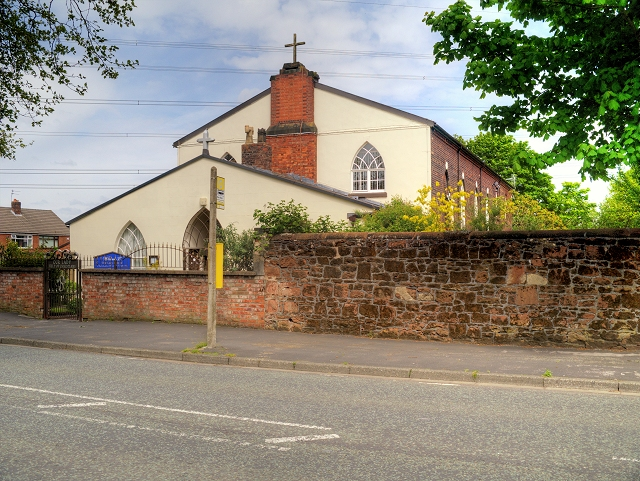
- Front entrance

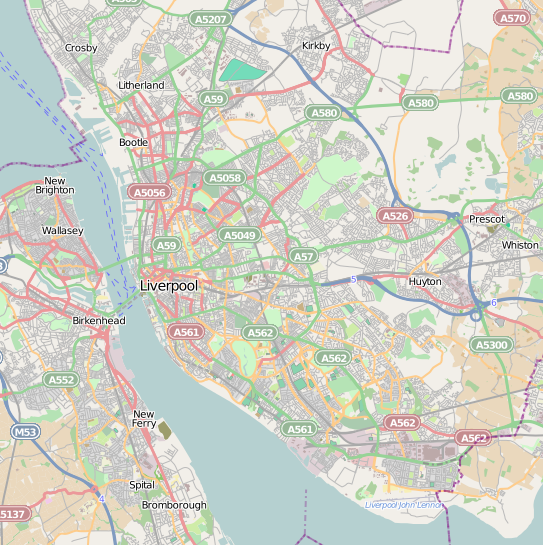
- Location in Merseyside
- OS grid reference: SJ 48422 93323
- Country: England
- Denomination: Roman Catholic
- Website: http://ourladysportico.org/

History
- Status: Active
- Founded: 1790; 236 years ago
- Dedication: Mary Help of Christians

Architecture
- Functional status: Parish church
- Architect: George Marsh

Administration
- Archdiocese: Liverpool
- Deanery: Knowsley

Clergy
- Priest: Rev. Andrew Rowlands (2023- present)

Our Lady Help of Christians Church is a Roman Catholic Parish church in the Portico area of Prescot, Merseyside. It was founded in 1790 by the Society of Jesus.

== History ==
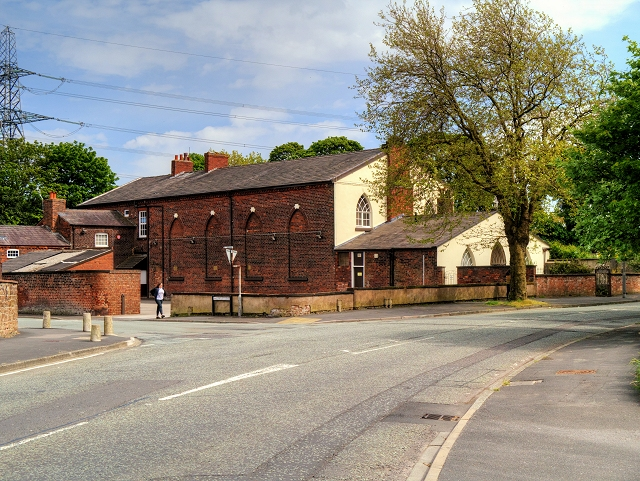
West side of church

The Jesuits were present in the area from 1716 and lived in a house on Scoles Lane. After the building of a Catholic church in the area was permitted, George Marsh a local architect was contracted to design the new church. In 1790, a small presbytery and chapel was built for the local Catholics in the area. The chapel was built as an extension to the back of the presbytery. As there was no other Catholic church in the area, when it was built, if the local Catholics wanted to attend Mass, they had to come to the church. This lasted until 1856, when Our Lady Immaculate and St Joseph Church was built in the centre of the town.

At some point in the 20th century, the parish was handed over by the Jesuits to the Archdiocese of Liverpool who continue to serve the church.

In 2005, the Pope John Paul II Blessed Sacrament chapel was opened in the church.

== Parish ==
The church has two Sunday Masses, one at 5:30pm on Saturday and at 11:00am on Sunday.

Both the Our Lady of Help of Christians and Our Lady Immaculate and St Joseph churches have a relationship with Our Lady's Primary School in Prescot, whose mission statement states ' What we hoped to achieve in all that we do is as a living community of God'.

== See also ==
- Our Lady Immaculate and St Joseph Church, Prescot
- Society of Jesus
- Prescot
