= Richard C. Willson =

Biochemical engineer

Richard Coale Willson
- Education: California Institute of Technology; Massachusetts Institute of Technology
- Awards: Elected Fellow of the Royal Society of Chemistry Alan S. Michaels Award in Bioseparations, American Chemical Society; Pierce Award in Affinity Technology; Elected Fellow of the National Academy of Inventors; Fellow of the American Chemical Society; James M. van Lanen Distinguished Service Award Elected Fellow of the American Institute for Medical and Biological Engineering
- Scientific career
- Workplaces: University of Houston
- Thesis: Fermentation product recovery by supercritical fluid extraction : microbiological and phase equilibrium aspects (1988)
- Doctoral advisor: Charles L. Cooney; Richard C. Reid

Richard Coale Willson is an American chemical engineer, academic, and biotechnology entrepreneur. He is the Huffington–Woestemeyer Professor of Chemical and Biomolecular Engineering in the William A. Brookshire Department of Chemical and Biomedical Engineering at the University of Houston, with a joint appointment in the Department of Biology and Biochemistry. Willson is also director of the University of Houston Drug Discovery Institute. Willson works on biomolecular recognition, bioseparations, and molecular diagnostics. He develops methods of detection and measurement technologies for applications in pharmaceutical manufacturing, process control, and medical diagnostics. Willson has been elected a Fellow of the American Chemical Society, the American Institute for Medical and Biological Engineering, the Royal Society of Chemistry, and the National Academy of Inventors Wilson is a Distinguished Visiting Professor at Tecnológico de Monterrey at the Monterrey Institute of Technology and Higher Education, and holds appointments in the Quantitative and Computational Biology program of Baylor College of Medicine and at the Houston Methodist Research Institute.

In addition to his academic work, he was a founding member of the Technology Advisory Board of Moderna and served as Chief Technology Officer of VisiGen Biotechnologies.

== Education ==
Willson received B.S. (Honors) and M.S. (air quality in Telluride, Colorado; with Fred Shair) degrees in chemical engineering from Caltech in 1981 and 1982, respectively. He moved to the Massachusetts Institute of Technology for doctoral work, advised by Charles L. Cooley and Richard C. Reid, earning a doctorate in 1998. He was then a postdoc with Jonathan King in the MIT Department of Biology.

== Academic career ==
After completing his training, Willson joined the faculty of the University of Houston, where he has established a multidisciplinary research group spanning chemical engineering, molecular biology, and biotechnology. He is the Huffington–Woestemeyer Professor of Chemical and Biomolecular Engineering in the William A. Brookshire Department of Chemical and Biomolecular Engineering, with courtesy appointments in the Department of Biology and Biochemistry and the Department of Biomedical Engineering. At UH Willson has served as director of the University of Houston Drug Discovery Institute, Chair of the Faculty Senate Budget & Facilities Committee, interim director of the DHS Center of Excellence, organizer of the “Tier One” institutional transformation initiative, and interim associate Vice President for Technology Transfer at a time when UH had the largest patent royalty income among public, non-medical universities in the US.

=== Career highlights ===
- Luminostics (later Clip Health) spun out by Andrew Paterson and Bala Raja (FDA EUA for COVID-19 December 2020)
- Organizer, with Jonathan Coffman and Bruno Marques, of the “Highland Games,” an industry-wide benchmarking competition on the prediction of the developability properties of monoclonal antibodies (2019)
- Founding member of the Technology Advisory Board of Moderna (2012)
- Chief Technology Officer of VisiGen Biotechnologies (acquired by Life Technologies in 2008)
- President of the International Society for Molecular Recognition (2004–2007)
- Chair of the Division of Biochemical Technology (BIOT) of the American Chemical Society (1999)
- Founding member of the Technology Advisory Board of Moderna (2014)
- Chief Technology Officer of VisiGen Biotechnologies (acquired by Life Technologies in 2008)
- President of the International Society for Molecular Recognition (2004–2007)
- Chair of the Division of Biochemical Technology (BIOT) of the American Chemical Society (1999)

== Awards and honors ==
- Fellow of the Royal Society of Chemistry (2025)
- Alan S. Michaels Award in Recovery of Biological Products from the ACS Biotechnology Division(2021)
- Pierce Award in Affinity Technology from the International Society for Molecular Recognition(2015)
- Elected Fellow of the National Academy of Inventors (2014)
- Elected Fellow of the American Chemical Society (2011)
- Elected Fellow of the American Association for the Advancement of Science (2010)
- James M. van Lanen Distinguished Service Award from the ACS Biotechnology Division (2001)
- Fellow of the American Institute for Medical and Biological Engineering(2000)
- NSF Presidential Young Investigator (1990)
