= Our Lady Help of Christians Church, Luton =

Our Lady Help of Christians Church
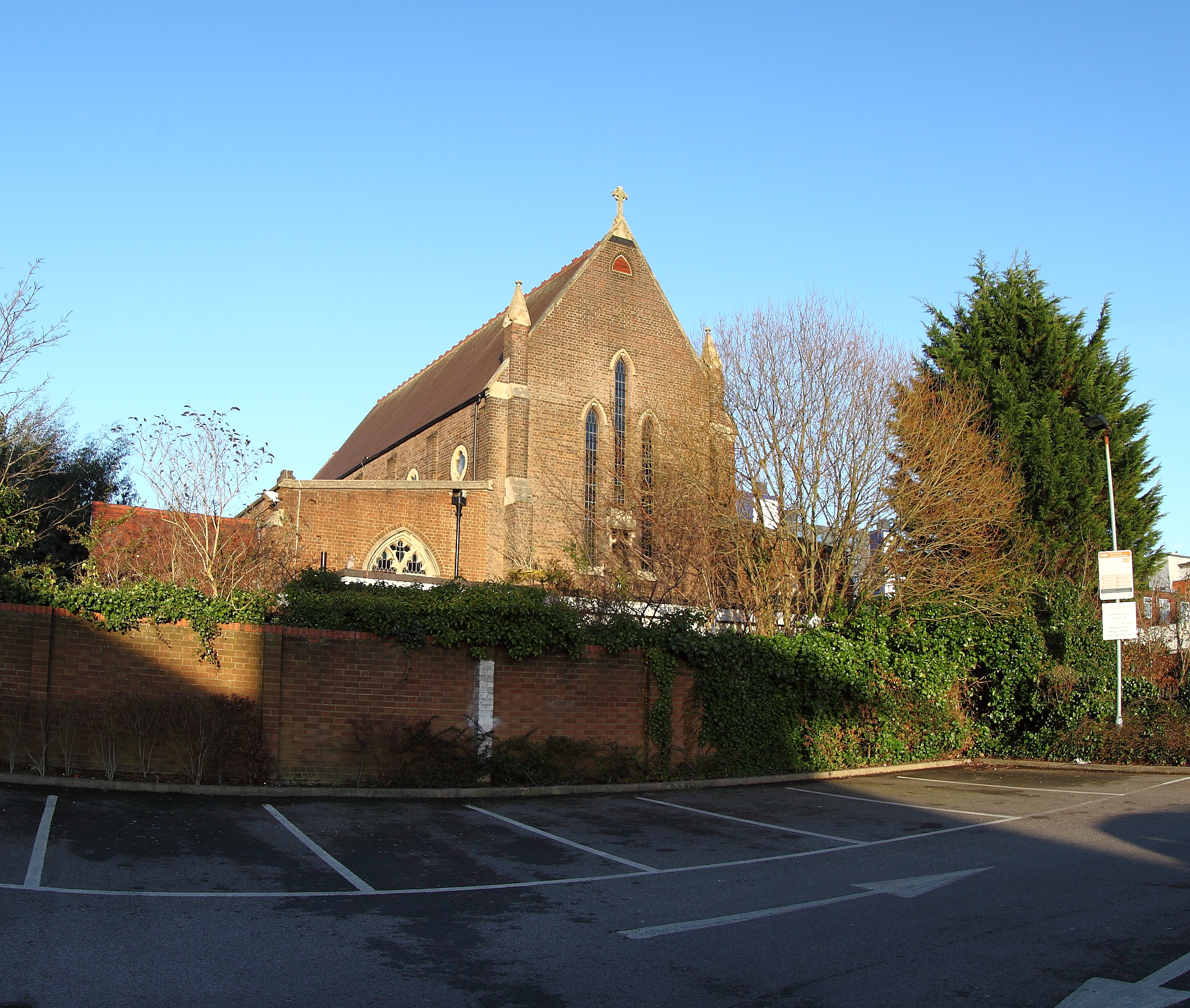
- Our Lady Help of Christians Church
- 51.875823°N 0.416205°W
- Location: Luton, Bedfordshire
- Country: England
- Denomination: Roman Catholic
- Website: https://www.olhc.uk

History
- Status: Parish church
- Founded: 1845
- Dedication: Mary Help of Christians

Architecture
- Functional status: Active
- Style: Gothic Revival
- Completed: 1910

Administration
- Province: Westminster
- Diocese: Northampton
- Deanery: Luton

Our Lady Help of Christians Church is a Roman Catholic Parish church in Luton, Bedfordshire. It was founded in 1845 and the present church was built in 1910. It is situated on the corner of Castle Street and Victoria Street, next to the A505 road, in the town centre. It was designed in the Gothic Revival style and is the first Roman Catholic church built in Luton after the Reformation.

== History ==
=== Foundation ===
In 1845, a mission was founded in the town by Fr S. Ward. In the 1880s, the mission was served from St Joseph's Church in Bedford, and served a congregation of 180 people.

On 20 January 1884, the mission was dedicated to Mary Help of Christians and its first Mass was said by Fr Joseph A. O'Connor. Efforts were made to raise funds for a permanent church. Later, in the 1880s, a church made of iron was constructed.

=== Construction ===
In 1910, on the same site of the iron church, the present church was built. It was made to accommodate a congregation of 350 people.

== Parish ==
The church has three Sunday Masses: 9:30am, 11:30am and 5:00pm. There is a Mass at 12:45pm every weekday.

== See also ==
- Roman Catholic Diocese of Northampton
