= Lancashire Watch Company =

Watch company

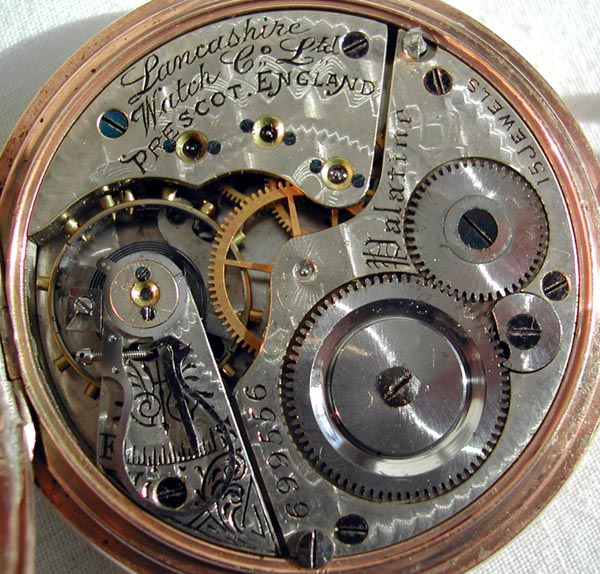
Lancashire Watch Company pocket watch movement

The Lancashire Watch Company of Prescot was founded in 1889 by Thomas P. Hewitt as a rival to the large American and Swiss watch companies.

== History ==
Until the late 19th century, Prescot had been the centre of the watchmaking trade in England. The workers produced watch parts in small workshops attached to their cottages and were paid by piece work. By 1889 the American System of Watch Manufacturing meant that the Waltham Watch Company and others could produce watches at a much lower price and the town fell into decline.

In 1889 a company was formed and eventually a large factory was built to create complete watches under one roof. The products produced had more in common with earlier American designs than traditional English fusee watches. Because of economies of scale the Lancashire Watch Company struggled to compete with the larger American and Swiss factories. It could not make a profit and went bankrupt in 1910. Thomas P Hewitt's watch was sold at Christies Auction in 1995 fetching $215,000, purchased by Robbie Dickson; a well-known historical watch collector.

== Sources ==
- The Lancashire Watch Company: Prescot, Lancashire, England 1889-1910., Roberts, Kenneth D., Alan Smith, Henry G. Abbett, Ken Roberts Publishing, New Hampshire 1973 ISBN 0-913602-08-6
- Lancashire Watch Company History and Watches by John G Platt. Published by inbeat publications, Chester, UK; printed by Cambrian Printers, Aberystwyth, Wales; May 2016 ISBN 978-0-9573733-2-7

=== Further reading ===
- The Watchmaker & Jeweller, Silversmith & Optician, volume 18 (1892–1893)
