= Richard Wilson (scholar) =

Professor of Shakespeare Studies at Kingston University, London

Professor Richard Wilson
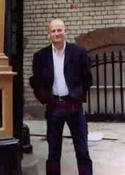
- Born: 1950 (age 75–76)
- Education: University of York
- Occupations: Early modern scholar and anniversary professor at Kingston University

Professor Richard Wilson (born 1950) is the Sir Peter Hall Professor of Shakespeare Studies at Kingston University, London.

== Education and employment ==
Richard Wilson studied at the University of York (1970–5) with Philip Brockbank, C.A. Patrides and F.R. Leavis, who influenced his close reading in historical contexts. He wrote his PhD thesis under the supervision of Jacques Berthoud on Shakespeare and Renaissance perspective theory.

Taught at University of Lancaster 1978–2005:

- Lecturer in English Literature, 1978
- Reader in Renaissance Studies, 1993
- Professor of Renaissance Studies, 1994
- Director of the Lancaster Shakespeare Programme

Taught at Cardiff University 2005–2012

- Professor of English Literature
- Convenor of the Medieval and Early Modern Research Initiative (MEMORI)

Taught at Kingston University 2012–

- Sir Peter Hall Professor of Shakespeare Studies
- Convenor of the Kingston Shakespeare Seminar (KiSS)

Visiting Fellowships and Professorships

- Visiting Fellow, Shakespeare Institute, University of Birmingham, 1991-2
- Visiting Professor, University of Paris III (Sorbonne Nouvelle), 2001-2
- 2006 Fellow, Shakespeare's Globe, London
- Distinguished Visiting Professor, University of Paris IV (Paris-Sorbonne), 2011–12
- Plumer Fellow, St Anne's College, Oxford University, 2019

Special Lectures

- 2001 British Academy Shakespeare Lecture: 'A World Elsewhere: Shakespeare's Sense of an Exit'
- 2004 Rutherford Lecture at the University of Kent: 'Shakespeare in Hate: Performing the Virgin Queen'
- 2005 Stachniewski Lecture at Manchester University: 'Making Men of Monsters: Shakespeare in the company of strangers'
- 2006 Shakespeare's Globe Fellowship Lecture: 'Fools of Time: Shakespeare and the Martyrs'
- 2012 Shakespeare Institute Lecture, Stratford: 'Monstrous To Our Human Reason: Minding the gap in "The Winter's Tale"' (8 March)
- 2012 Agder Academy Lecture, Kristiansand: 'Denmark's a Prison: "Hamlet" and Christian IV' [Årbok for 2012 – AGDER VITENSKAPSAKADEMI]
- 2013 Inaugural Lecture at Kingston University: 'Sermons in Stones: Shakespeare's Dangerous Thresholds' (30 October)
- 2014 Shakespeare Birthday Lecture at the University of Hull: 'Moonlight Sonata: Larkin and the Shakespeare Prize' (30 April)
- 2016 Shakespeare Now Lecture at the University of Zurich: 'The Madness of King Charles III: Shakespeare and the Modern Monarchy' (12 May)
- 2016 Shakespeare 400 Lecture at LMU Munich: 'A Girdle Round About the Earth: Shakespeare Goes Global' (21 June)
- 2019 Plumer Fellowship Lecture, St Anne's College, Oxford: 'Bad Faith: Clara de Chambrun and Le Grand Will' (22 May)

International Conferences

Richard Wilson has organised a series of international conferences:

- 'Religion, Region, Patronage and Performance' at Lancaster University and Hoghton Tower, Lancashire, 1999
- 'The New Shakespeare: A writer and his readers: The Return of the Author in Shakespeare Studies' at Lancaster Castle, 2004
- 'Shakespeare, Violence & Terror' at Shakespeare's Globe, 2006
- 'Shakespeare and Derrida' at Cardiff University, 2007
- 'Shakespeare and Wales' at Cardiff University, 2010
- 'Garrick and Shakespeare' at Garrick's Temple, Hampton, and the Rose Theatre, Kingston, 2014
- 'Jan Kott Our Contemporary' at the Rose Theatre, Kingston, 2015
- 'Shakespeare and Scandinavia' at the Rose Theatre and Garrick's Temple, 2015
- 'Frances Yates and the Art of Memory' at the Rose Theatre, 2016
- 'Shakespeare and the Enlightenment', at Garrick's Temple, 2016
- 'Hegel and Shakespeare', at Garrick's Temple, 2017
- 'Marx and Shakespeare', at Garrick's Temple, 2017
- 'Nietzsche and Shakespeare', at Garrick's Temple, 2017
- 'Marlowe and Shakespeare', at the Rose Theatre, 2017
- 'Lacan and Shakespeare', at Garrick's Temple, 2018
- 'Foucault and Shakespeare', at Garrick's Temple, 2018
- 'Derrida and Shakespeare', at Garrick's Temple, 2018
- 'John Barton, Peter Hall and Shakespeare', at the Rose Theatre, 2018
- 'New Old Spaces', at the Rose Theatre, 2018
- 'Walter Benjamin and Shakespeare', at Garrick's Temple, 2019
- 'The Hollow Crown: Shakespeare and Political Theology', at Hampton Court Palace, 2019
- 'Ernst Kantorowicz and Shakespeare', at Garrick's Temple, 2019
- 'Hannah Arendt and Shakespeare', at Garrick's Temple, 2019
- 'Peter Brook and Shakespeare', at the Institut Francais, London, 2019

Academic Advisor

Since 1999 he has been a Trustee of Shakespeare North. He is Academic Advisor on its project to rebuild the Elizabethan playhouse at Prescot (Knowsley) near Liverpool.

He was an academic advisor for the BBC series In Search of Shakespeare (2001). He appears in the series, interviewed by Michael Wood.

Richard Wilson is based at the Rose Theatre, Kingston-upon-Thames, which was created by the director Sir Peter Hall to be a 'teaching theatre' where actors and academics worked together. The theatre is modelled on the Elizabethan Rose playhouse on Bankside.

== Publications ==
Richard Wilson's publications include Will Power, Secret Shakespeare, Shakespeare in French Theory, Free Will and Worldly Shakespeare. Influenced by continental philosophy, as well as Anglo-American criticism, he reads Shakespearean drama in terms of its agonistic conflict. It is his research into the conditions of this conflict that led him to his proposition, in Secret Shakespeare, that 'the bloody question' of loyalty during Europe's wars of religion was hardwired into Shakespeare's dramatic imagination, and that in play after play the same scenario is repeated, when some sovereign or seducer, like King Lear, demands to know who 'doth love us', and a resister such as Cordelia responds: 'I cannot heave / My heart into my mouth'. In this way, Shakespeare makes a drama out of 'being dumb' [Sonnet 83].

Wilson is known for his archival research on Shakespeare's Catholic background and possible Lancashire connections. But in Secret Shakespeare (2004) he argued that 'though Shakespeare was born into a Catholic world, he reacted against it' and 'resisted the resistance'. Like the painter Caravaggio, what Shakespeare performs, the book concluded, was not some hidden secret, but secrecy itself.

Shakespeare's 'theatre of shadows' stages 'the instability of the opposition between authorised and unauthorised violence' and 'the recognition of the reversibility of monsters and martyrs, terrorists and torturers, or artists and assassins', in this interpretation. Thus, in Shakespeare in French Theory (2006) Wilson explains that while for English culture Shakespeare is a man of the monarchy, in France he has always been the man of the mob.

Wilson's 2013 book Free Will: Art and Power on Shakespeare's Stage is a comprehensive rereading of the plays in terms of Shakespeare's patronage relations. It maintains that the dramatist found artistic freedom by adopting an 'abject position' towards authority, and by staging 'the power of weakness' in the 'investiture crisis' of the age of absolutism.

With Worldly Shakespeare: The Theatre of Our Good Will (2016) Wilson extends this agonistic approach to questions of globalisation, and proposes that Shakespeare created a drama without catharsis, in which the imperative to 'offend but with good will' prefigures the globalised communities of our own 'time of Facebook and fatwa, internet and intifada'. Robert Stagg described this book in the Times Literary Supplement as 'dazzling'.

Associated since the 1980s with the British Cultural Materialist school of criticism, according to Will Power (1993) Wilson's work aims to combine 'high theory and low archives'. He was described by the critic A.D. Nuttall as 'Perhaps the most brilliant of the Shakespearean Historicists'.

Richard Wilson has published over a hundred chapters or articles in academic journals, and is on the editorial boards of the journals Shakespeare and Marlowe Studies

=== Books ===
- Shakespeare: Julius Caesar: A Critical Study (1992) ISBN 978-0-14-077265-4
- Will Power: Essays on Shakespearean Authority (1993) ISBN 978-0-8143-2492-9
- Secret Shakespeare: Studies in Theatre, Religion and Resistance (2004) ISBN 978-0-7190-7025-9
- Shakespeare in French Theory: King of Shadows (2006) ISBN 978-0-415-42165-2
- Free Will: Art and Power on Shakespeare's Stage (2013) ISBN 978-0-7190-9178-0
- Worldly Shakespeare: The Theatre of Our Good Will (2016) ISBN 978-1-4744-1134-9

=== Edited volumes ===
- New Historicism and Renaissance Drama (with Richard Dutton) (1992) ISBN 978-0-582-04554-5
- Christopher Marlowe (1999) ISBN 978-0-582-04554-5
- New Casebook: Julius Caesar (2001) ISBN 978-0-333-75467-2
- Region, Religion and Patronage (with Richard Dutton and Alison Findlay) (2004) ISBN 978-0-7190-6369-5
- Theatre and Religion (with Richard Dutton and Alison Findlay) (2004) ISBN 978-0-7190-6363-3
- Shakespeare's Book: Essays in Reading, Writing and Reception (with Richard Meek and Jane Rickard) (2008) ISBN 978-0-7190-7905-4
- Shakespeare and Continental Philosophy (with Jennifer Ann Bates) (2014) ISBN 978-0-7486-9495-2

=== Newspaper articles ===
- Times Literary Supplement, 19 December 1997 – 'Shakespeare and the Jesuits'
- The Independent, 28 April 2005 – 'Shakespeare understood that every foreigner brings gifts'

== Main influences ==
- New Historicism
- F.R. Leavis
- Jacques Derrida
- Michel Foucault

== Books reviewed ==
- Stuart Sillars, "Review: Claire Asquith (2004), Shadowplay. Richard Wilson (2004), Secret Shakespeare", Nordic Journal of English Studies 4(2), (December 2005).
- The Free Library – Review of Shakespeare in French Theory by Christopher Pye (January 2009)
- The Observer – Joint review of Richard Wilson's Secret Shakespeare and Stephen Greenblatt's Will in the World (October 2004)
- Anne Barton, 'The One and Only', The New York Review of Books, 11 May 2006
