= Prescot Playhouse =

Elizabethan theater in Prescot

Coordinates: 53.4298°N 2.8020°W

The Prescot Playhouse was an Elizabethan theatre in the town of Prescot, which was then in Lancashire. The playhouse was built before 1603, probably in the mid-1590s, and probably remained in theatrical use until 1609. It was one of the few free-standing theatres in England outside London, and probably hosted performances by the playing companies maintained by the Earls of Derby.

== Location ==
The theatre's existence was discovered in court records by F. A. Bailey, a local historian, in 1952. The records describe the plot of land on which it stood as 57 feet (17 m) long on its north and south sides, 29 feet (8.8 m) on the east and 15 feet (4.6 m) on the west, "at the upper end of the street leading to Eccleston". Local tradition points to the site of a modern landmark on Eccleston Street, the Flat Iron Building, whereas the historian David George, following Bailey, placed it in the southeast corner of what was then common land known as Town Moss (just north of the modern junction of High Street and St Helens Road). Later research by Graham and Tyler, however, places it at the eastern end of the former Newgate Street, on its north side, thereby restoring it to the vicinity of the modern Flat Iron Building.

== Ownership ==
The playhouse was built and owned by Richard Harrington, the tenant of Prescot Hall, and younger brother of Percival Harrington, deputy steward of Prescot for the Earls of Derby. After Richard Harrington's death in February 1603, the playhouse passed to his wife, Elizabeth née Molyneux, a relative of Sir Richard Molyneux.

== Theatrical use ==
The Earls of Derby were patrons of playing companies, and had a tradition of hosting performances at their principal residences, including at Knowsley Hall just north of Prescot. David George suggests that the playhouse was built sometime between 1593 and 1595, with the backing of either Ferdinando Stanley, 5th Earl of Derby, or William Stanley, 6th Earl of Derby, as a purpose-built venue for their actors, known as Lord Strange's Men or the Earl of Derby's Men, when they were forced out of London by the 1592 plague outbreak. Lord Strange's Men are known to have been performers of some of Shakespeare's earliest plays. The playhouse was possibly the only purpose-built, free-standing theatre in England outside London at that time.

By 1609 the building had been converted into a dwelling. George believes that it probably remained in use as a playhouse until that year. Graham and Tyler propose a period of theatrical use of only 1597/8 – 1609.

== Shakespeare North ==
The Prescot Playhouse inspired the Shakespeare North project to build a Shakespearean complex in Prescot, including a playhouse and an educational centre. As no architectural plans survive for the Prescot Playhouse, the new theatre's layout was based on the 1629 design by Inigo Jones for the Cockpit-in-Court theatre in the Palace of Whitehall, London. The theatre opened in July 2022.
