= Prescot =

Town in Merseyside, England

- Town
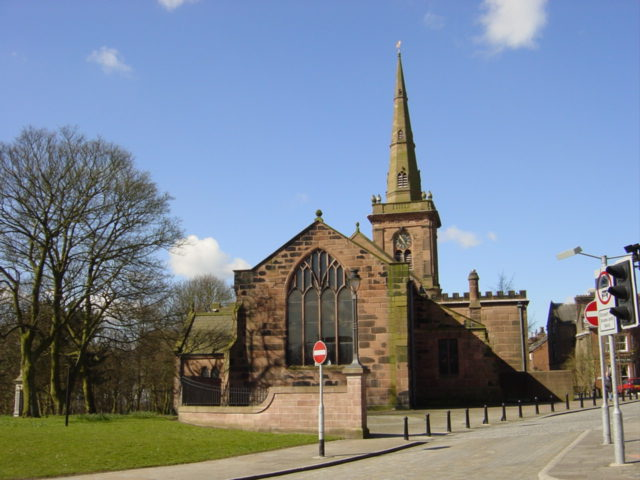
- St Mary's Church, Prescot

- Location within Merseyside
- Population: 11,184 (2001 Census)
- OS grid reference: SJ4692
- Civil parish: Prescot
- Metropolitan borough: Knowsley
- Metropolitan county: Merseyside
- Region: North West
- Country: England
- Sovereign state: United Kingdom
- Post town: PRESCOT
- Postcode district: L34/L35
- Dialling code: 0151
- Police: Merseyside
- Fire: Merseyside
- Ambulance: North West
- UK Parliament: Knowsley; St Helens South and Whiston

Prescot is a town and civil parish in the Metropolitan Borough of Knowsley, Merseyside, England. It lies about 8 miles (13 km) to the east of Liverpool city centre. At the 2001 Census, the civil parish population was 11,184 (5,265 males, 5,919 females). The population of the larger Prescot East and West wards at the 2011 census totalled 14,139. Prescot marks the beginning of the A58 road which runs through to Wetherby, near Leeds in West Yorkshire. The town is served by Prescot railway station and Eccleston Park railway station in neighbouring Eccleston.

== History ==
Prescot's name is believed to be derived from the Anglo-Saxon prēost "priest" + cot "cot", meaning a cottage or small house owned or inhabited by a priest, a "priest-cottage". (ME prest, preste, priest, OE prēost, LL presbyter, Gk πρεσβύτερος presbýteros "elder, priest")

In the 14th century, William Dacre, 2nd Baron Dacre, obtained a charter for the holding of a three-day market and moveable fair at Prescot, to begin on the Wednesday following Corpus Christi.

In 1593, the English political philosopher Gerrard Winstanley's parents, Edward and Isabell Winstanley, originally from Wigan, were married in Prescot.

From the mid-1590s to 1609, Prescot was home to the Prescot Playhouse, a purpose-built Shakespearean theatre, probably located on Eccleston Street. In the sixteenth century it was a small town of about 400 inhabitants, and not much bigger by the late seventeenth century.

During the 18th and 19th centuries it was at the centre of the watch and clock-making industry. This ended with the failure of the Lancashire Watch Company in 1910. In later years the BICC company was the primary industrial employer in the town. BICC ceased operations in Prescot in the early 1990s before the site was demolished and later cleared. The land remained desolate until 2000 when it was then regenerated into what is now known as Cables Retail Park, the name of which is a reference to the BICC and the history of the site on which it was built.

== Governance ==
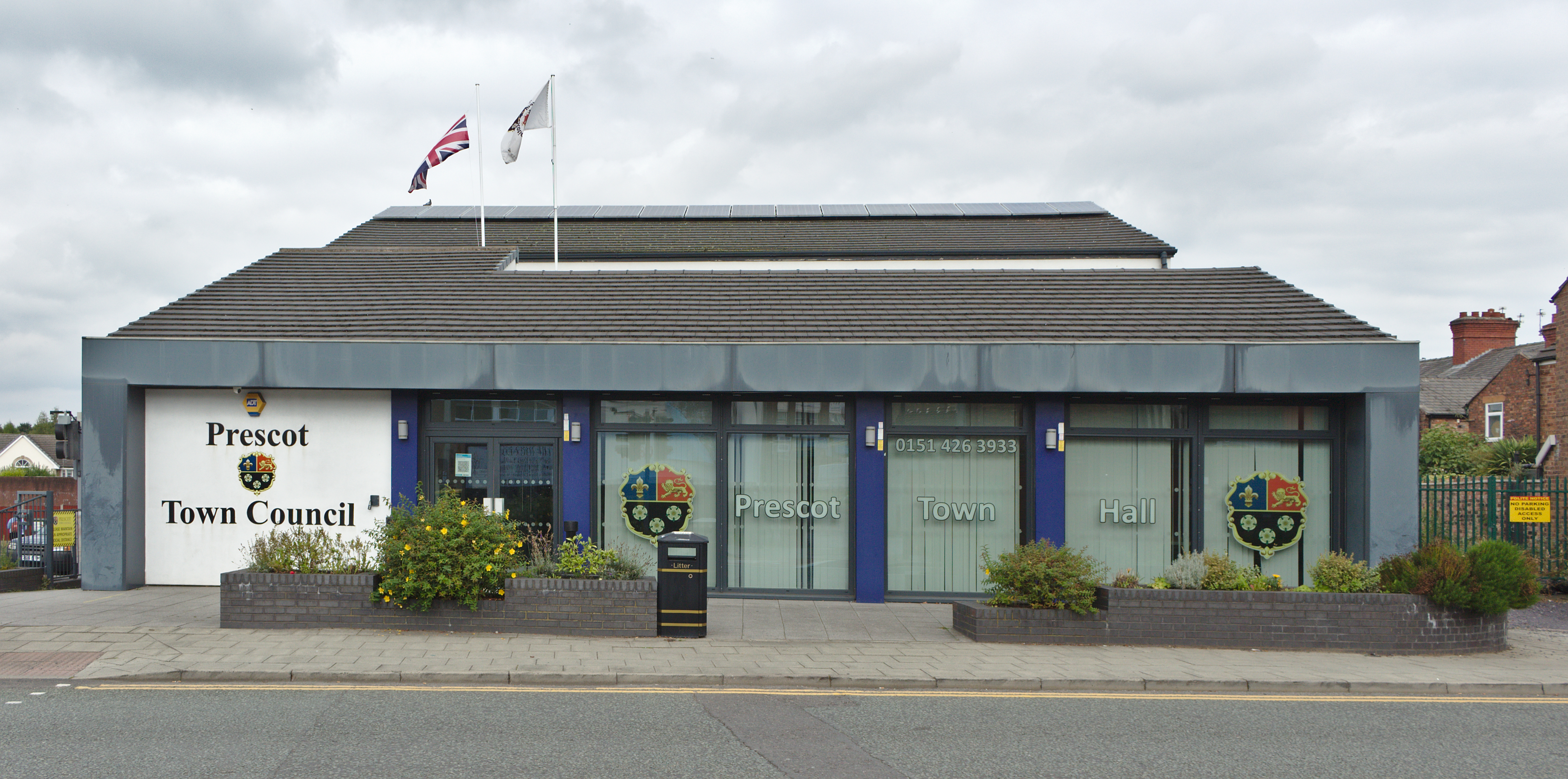
Prescot Town Hall

Prescot has historically been within the historic county of Lancashire. The town was contained in the Prescot Urban District in the administrative county of Lancashire from 1894.

When the administrative counties were abolished in 1974 the district became part of the Metropolitan Borough of Knowsley in the metropolitan county of Merseyside. It is currently served by Prescot Town Council and Knowsley Metropolitan Borough Council. The current iteration of Prescot Town Hall is a converted public house: the conversion works were completed in 2014.

== Churches ==
The centre of Prescot has six churches. Dominating the skyline is the 17th-century Prescot Parish Church of St Mary's is the only Grade I listed building in the borough of Knowsley. Tucked away behind St Mary's is the Roman Catholic Church of Our Lady and St Joseph designed by Joseph Aloysius Hansom, inventor of the Hansom Cab. Prescot Methodist Church celebrated its 100th anniversary in 2009, but the building has since been converted into apartments. The congregation continues to exist, however, meeting in the adjacent church hall, known as Prescot Methodist Centre which has now been converted into a church. Also in the town are a Salvation Army church, an Elim Pentecostal church (Prescot Community Church) and the Zion Independent Methodist Church. Outside the centre, in the Portico area of the town is the Catholic Our Lady Help of Christians Church.

Places of worship shut down or moved over the past 20 years include the United Reformed church, the Kingdom Hall (Jehovah's Witnesses), the Plymouth Brethren Gospel Hall and an independent charismatic church called simply Prescot Christian Fellowship.

== Tourism, leisure and places of interest ==
Prescot Museum houses a permanent exhibition about the history of clock and watch-making in the town, and several temporary exhibitions per year. The Georgian building is now also home to Knowsley Council's Arts and Events Service.

On the edge of the town is the estate of the Earl of Derby, which includes the Knowsley Safari Park.

In recent years, several cultural and arts events have been established in the town, including the annual 10-day Prescot Festival of Music and the Arts and an annual Elizabethan Fayre.

The Shakespeare North Trust promotes William Shakespeare's historic connection with the town, a subject being researched at Liverpool's John Moores University. Inspired by the historic Prescot Playhouse, the Trust has built the Shakespeare North complex in Prescot, including a Shakespearean playhouse and an educational centre. In April 2016, Knowsley Council granted planning permission for the new playhouse. Construction work on the new The Shakespeare North Playhouse was completed in late 2022.

Stone Street (53°25′45″N 2°48′17″W), running between High Street and Eccleston Street, is just 26 inches wide at its southern end and is one of the narrowest streets in Britain.

== Sport ==
The area's local football team Prescot Cables currently play in the Northern Premier League Premier Division at Valerie Park. Prescot & Odyssey Cricket Club is located near Knowsley Safari Park.

== Media ==
Local news and television programmes are provided by BBC North West and ITV Granada. Television signals are received from the Winter Hill TV transmitter. Local radio stations are BBC Radio Merseyside, Heart North West, Capital North West and North Wales, Hits Radio Liverpool, Smooth North West, and Greatest Hits Radio Liverpool & The North West. The town is served by the local newspapers Prescot & Knowsley Reporter and Liverpool Echo.

== Historic estates ==
The estate of Parr was within the ancient ecclesiastical parish of Prescot in modern-day Parr, St Helens. This was the original seat of the Parr family, of which Queen Katherine Parr, the last wife of King Henry VIII, was a member.

== Notable residents ==
- Actress Stephanie Davis (Hollyoaks, Coronation Street) born and grew up in Whiston, Prescot
- Frederick Griffith (1877–1941) bacteriologist, was born in Prescot
- Former Bolton Wanderers player Derek Hennin; was born in Prescot and won the FA Cup in 1958 with Bolton Wanderers.
- Actress Sue Johnston (Brookside, The Royle Family); born in Warrington, grew up in Prescot.
- Actress Christine Kavanagh (Seaforth, The Glass Virgin); was born in Prescot
- Shakespearean actor John Philip Kemble was born in Prescot. His house has since been demolished, but the road has been renamed Kemble Street. The John Kemble Pub (later renamed ‘The Bath Springs’) stood in his honour
- Former Huddersfield Town player Billy Mercer; started his career at Prescot Cables and won 2 First Division titles and appeared in an FA Cup final for Huddersfield Town
- Former Everton manager Dick Molyneux; who won Everton's first League Title was born in Prescot
- Sylvia Gore, former Women's football player, who scored the first ever professional goal for England Women's Team; was born and lived in Prescot
- Electrical engineer, scientist and entrepreneur Professor Peter Lawrenson; involved in the development of switched reluctance motors was born in Prescot
- Australian politician Jeanette Powell; born in Prescot, emigrated as a child
- Reverend Arthur Herbert Procter, Victoria Cross recipient, was Curate at St Mary's Church from 1927 to 1931
- Nigel Roberts, computer scientist and early Internet pioneer attended Prescot Grammar School
- Singer/songwriter Lally Stott most famous for the hit single Chirpy Chirpy Cheep Cheep was born and lived in Prescot
- Stuart Sutcliffe, early member of the Beatles attended Prescot Grammar School
- Professor Sid Watkins, world-renowned neurosurgeon who served twenty-six years as the FIA Formula One Safety Delegate and Medical Delegate, head of the Formula One on-track medical team, and first responder in case of a crash attended Prescot Grammar School
- Former Everton player Mark Ward; lived in Prescot at time of arrest.

== See also ==
- Listed buildings in Prescot
- Prescot reservoir
- The Prescot School
