= Knowsley Community College =

Location
- Borough of Knowsley, Merseyside; England; 53.413194°N 2.851077°W

Information
- Type: Further education college
- Established: 1990
- Department for Education URN: 130486 Tables
- Ofsted: Reports
- Gender: coeducational
- Age: 16+
- Website: https://www.knowsleycollege.ac.uk/

Knowsley Community College is a further education college based over three sites in the Metropolitan Borough of Knowsley, in Merseyside, England.

== History ==
The college was established in 1990 as a tertiary college, as a result of a merger between Kirkby College of Further Education and Knowsley Central Tertiary College. Today, the college has two main further education sites in Kirkby and Knowsley and previously a sixth form centre in Roby.

== Courses ==
Courses offered by the college include A Levels, BTECs, apprenticeships and Access courses. Knowsley Community College also offers some higher education courses in conjunction with Edge Hill University.

== KCC Live ==
KCC Live
- Liverpool; England
- Broadcast area: Knowsley, Liverpool, Merseyside
- Frequencies: 99.8 FM; Online

Programming
- Format: Community

Ownership
- Owner: Knowsley Community College

History
- First air date: 1 December 2003 (1251MW), 18 June 2009 (99.8FM)

Links
- Website: www.kcclive.com

KCC Live is a community radio station based in Knowsley Community College, broadcasting across Knowsley, surrounding areas such as Liverpool and online to 10 - 24 year olds.

=== History ===
KCC Live was launched on 1 December 2003 by Hywel Evans as the college radio station for Knowsley Community College. It broadcast on 1251 Medium Wave, through a web stream, and across the two college campuses.

KCC Live is based in the new Stockbridge Campus of Knowsley Community College and operates from two interchangeable live/pre-rec studios.

=== FM Community Radio ===
In 2008, KCC Live was successful in a bid for a community radio FM licence from Ofcom. KCC Live was allocated the frequency 99.8FM, and now broadcasts across Knowsley and surrounding areas such as Liverpool playing music and content exclusively tailored for 10- to 24-year-olds.

=== Daytime Broadcasting ===
KCC Live Broadcasts 24/7, playlisting a mix of music aimed at a younger generation such as Grime music, Urban music, Hip Hop music, House music and Rock music to name a few.
