= Prescot Parish Church =

Coordinates: 53.4285°N 2.8063°W

- Church of St Mary, Prescot
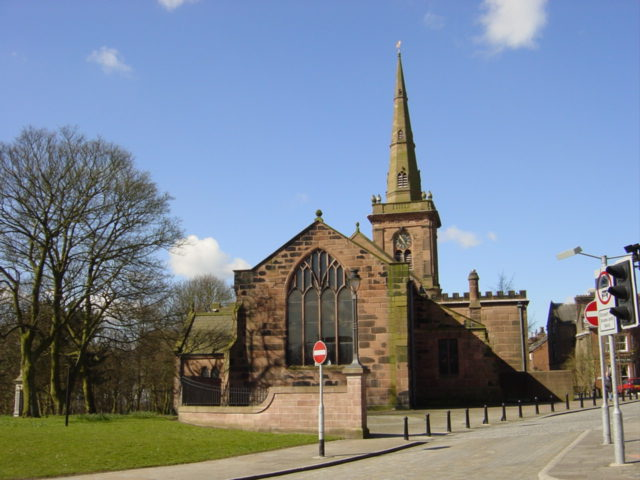
- Prescot Parish Church from the east

- Location in Merseyside
- OS grid reference: SJ 465 927
- Location: Prescot, Merseyside
- Country: England
- Denomination: Anglican
- Churchmanship: Anglo-Catholic
- Website: prescotparish.org.uk

History
- Status: Parish church

Architecture
- Functional status: Active
- Heritage designation: Grade I
- Designated: 19 March 1951
- Architect: Henry Sephton (steeple)
- Architectural type: Church
- Style: Gothic

Specifications
- Materials: Sandstone

Administration
- Province: York
- Diocese: Liverpool
- Archdeaconry: Knowsley and Sefton
- Deanery: Huyton
- Parish: Prescot

Clergy
- Vicar: Revd Kimberley Mannings

Prescot Parish Church, also known as St Mary's Church, is in the town of Prescot, Merseyside, England. It is recorded in the National Heritage List for England as a designated Grade I listed building, and is an active Anglican parish church.

== History ==
The circular shape of the churchyard suggests that a church was on the site before the Norman Conquest, and parts of the existing fabric in the chancel and north vestry date possibly from the 15th century. The church was largely rebuilt in 1610. The tower was built in 1729 and the spire added in 1797. The tower and spire were designed by Henry Sephton, the spire being rebuilt after a lightning strike. An organ was gifted by Elizabeth, the widow of William Atherton. The aisles were widened between 1817 and 1819, a restoration took place in 1876, and the south vestry was added in 1900. In 1953 the aisles were rebuilt.

=== Present day ===
Today, the Church of St Mary the Blessed Virgin is part of the Benefice of Prescot along with the Church of St Paul in the Diocese of Liverpool. St Mary's has a moderate Anglo-catholic churchmanship.

== Architecture ==
The church is built in red sandstone. Its plan consists of a west tower, a nave with a clerestory, north and south aisles and a chancel with north and south vestries. The tower has a west entrance with a three-light window above and an inscribed frieze. The bell stage has Doric flat pilasters and an entablature, 2-light louvred bell openings, and clock faces. The parapet has a balustrade and three finials to each angle, and the spire has three tiers of lucarnes. The tower contains a ringing peal of eight bells, cast by Charles & George Mears of the Whitechapel foundry in 1845. The bells were retuned and rehung in 1994. The aisles have cornices and embattled parapets.

Internally are five-bayed arcades. Stone plaques on the walls carry the arms and sometimes the initials of the 1610 benefactors. The stalls, with poppyhead carving, are dated 1636. The reredos is of panelled timber, dated 1891 and designed by Kempe. There are two fonts, one Norman and simple on a modern base, the other, which was donated in 1755, was previously an Italian marble stoup. The chancel screen is dated 1921. The stained glass includes some in the south aisle by Morris & Co. There are a number of monuments, including one on the south side dated 1803 by Sir Richard Westmacott, to the memory of plantation owner William Atherton of Prescot, surmounted with a family crest, with the Latin motto “clarior e tenebris” (brighter after the darkness), and a 1836 brass to George Case, Liverpool mayor and slave trader, which was designed by A. W. N. Pugin. The organ was built in 1822 by Gray & Davison and was substantially re-built by The John Compton Organ Company Ltd in the 1950s. It was overhauled by David Wells Organ Builders in 1992 and now consists of 54 speaking stops.

== External features ==
The churchyard contains the war graves of 24 service personnel, 22 of World War I and two of World War II.

== See also ==
- Grade I listed churches in Merseyside
- Listed buildings in Prescot
