= Judiciary of Hong Kong =

Law courts in the special administrative region of China

- 香港司法機構

Agency overview
- Formed: 1844
- Jurisdiction: Hong Kong
- Employees: 2079 (2025)
- Annual budget: $2.8 b HKD (2025)
- Agency executives: Andrew Cheung, Chief Justice; Esther Leung, Judiciary Administrator
- Website: judiciary.hk

The Judiciary of the Hong Kong Special Administrative Region is the judicial branch of the Hong Kong Special Administrative Region. Under the Basic Law of Hong Kong, it exercises the judicial power of the Region and is independent of the executive and legislative branches of the Government. The courts in Hong Kong hear and adjudicate all prosecutions and civil disputes, including all public and private law matters.

The hierarchy of the Hong Kong judiciary from high to low is: the Court of Final Appeal, the High Court (consisting of the upper Court of Appeal and the lower Court of First Instance), the District Court, and magistrates' courts. There are also some special courts and tribunals set up by law.

The Chief Justice of the Court of Final Appeal is head of the judiciary and assisted in his administrative duties by the Judiciary Administrator. A bilingual court system in which Chinese, English or both can be used was put in place, in accordance with the requirement of the Basic Law.

The Chief Justice and the judges of the Court of Final Appeal, both permanent and non-permanent, are forbidden by statute from practising as barristers or solicitors in Hong Kong while holding office or after leaving office. High Court and District Court judges are similarly required to undertake that they will not practise as barristers or solicitors in Hong Kong after leaving office, unless permitted by the Chief Executive. There are however no restrictions on becoming an arbitrator or mediator, as former Chief Justice Geoffrey Ma has become both following his retirement.

== The Court of Final Appeal ==
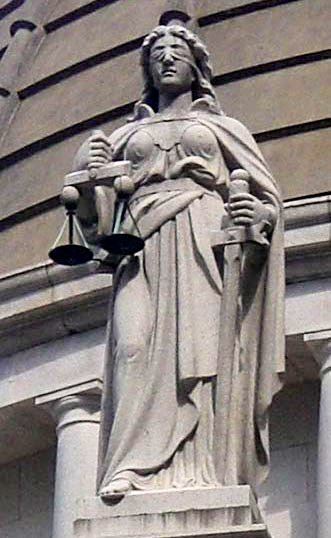
Statue of Themis on the Court of Final Appeal Building.

It was established on 1 July 1997 upon the commencement of the Hong Kong Court of Final Appeal Ordinance to safeguard the rule of law after 30 June 1997. It replaced the Judicial Committee of the Privy Council in London as the highest appellate court of Hong Kong. The Court, when sitting, comprises five judges — the Chief Justice, three permanent judges and one non-permanent judge from Hong Kong or another common law jurisdiction. There is, as of 2025, a panel of four non-permanent Hong Kong judges and six non-permanent judges from other common law jurisdictions.

Judges of the Court of Final Appeal wear a black robe and a white lace jabot. Unlike High Court and District Court judges, judges of the CFA do not wear wigs.

== The High Court ==
The High Court was established by the High Court Ordinance (Chapter 4, formerly titled the Supreme Court Ordinance), as the "Supreme Court of Hong Kong". It was renamed the "High Court" by Article 81 of the Basic Law of Hong Kong. It consists of the Court of Appeal and Court of First Instance, both of which are superior courts of record.

High Court judges are referred to as the Honourable Mr/Madam Justice (Surname) and are addressed as "My Lord" or "My Lady" in court. Judges of the Court of First Instance in civil cases and the Court of Appeal typically wear black silk gowns, bar jackets, wing collars and bands with a short horsehair wig in court, while judges of the Court of First Instance hearing criminal cases will wear a red-and-black gown with bands.

=== The Court of Appeal ===
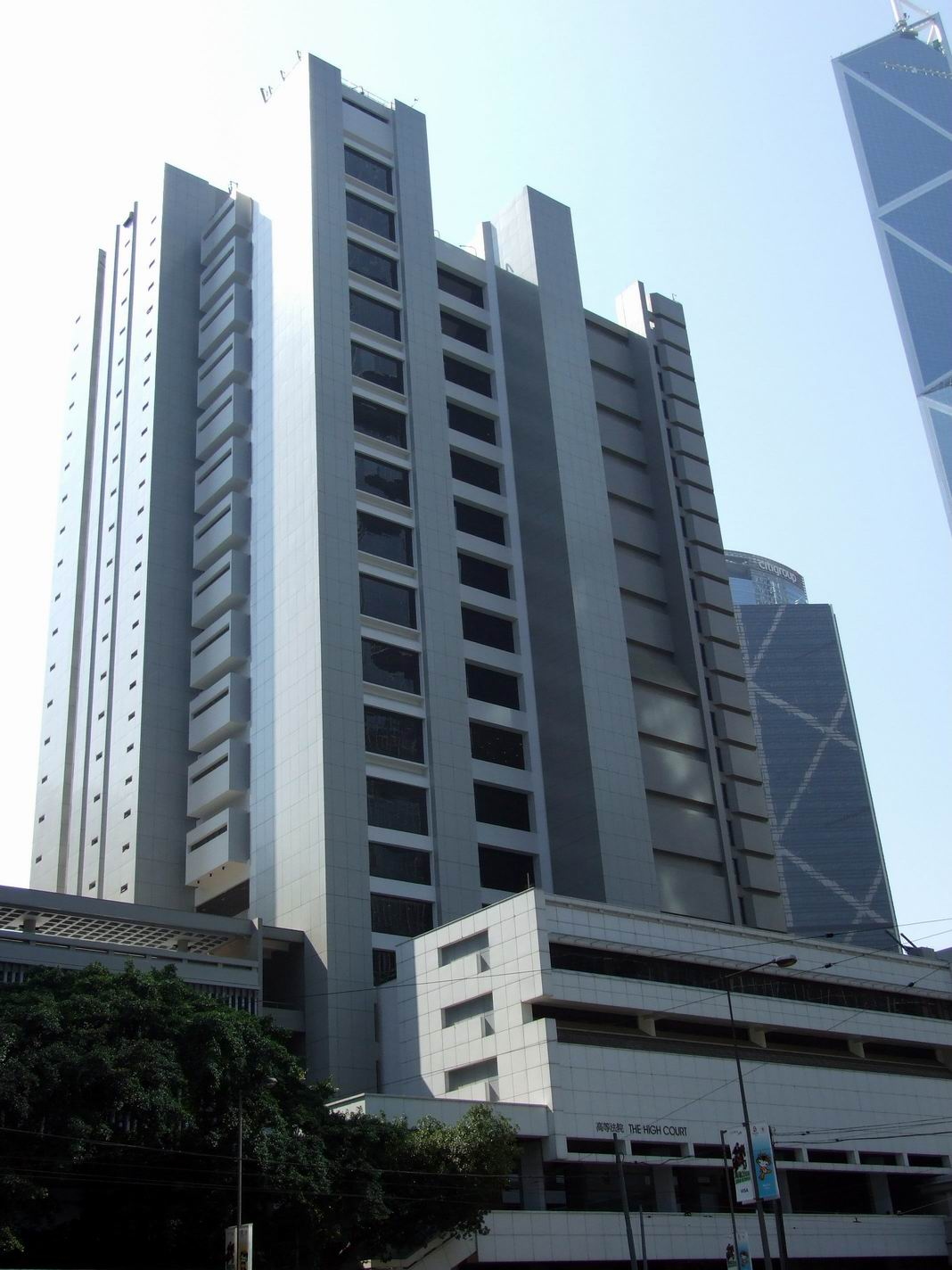
The High Court in Admiralty

It hears appeals on civil and criminal matters from the Court of First Instance and the District Court, as well as appeals from the Lands Tribunal. It also makes rulings on questions of law referred to it by the lower courts. As of June 2025, there are 13 Justices of Appeal, including the Chief Judge of the High Court and three vice-presidents.

For ceremonial occasions, Justices of Appeal wear the full wig, and a black gown with gold lace and a white jabot, similar to what is worn by Lords Justices in England and Wales.

=== The Court of First Instance ===
It has unlimited jurisdiction in both civil and criminal matters. It also exercises jurisdiction in admiralty, bankruptcy, company winding-up, family, adoption, probate and mental health matters. The most serious criminal offences, such as murder, manslaughter, rape, armed robbery, complex commercial frauds and drug offences involving large quantities, are tried by a judge of the Court of First Instance, sitting with a jury consisting of seven or, when a judge so orders, nine. As of June 2025, there are 28 full-time judges, 14 part-time recorders, and numerous part-time deputy judges serving on the court.

== The District Court ==
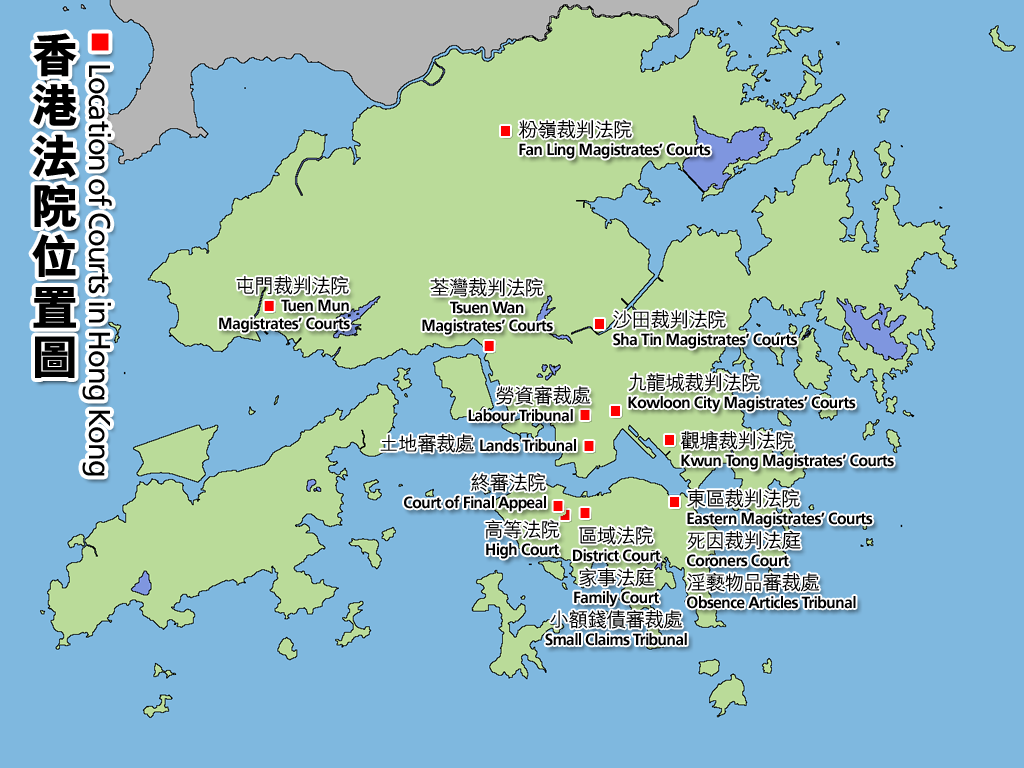
The location of courts in Hong Kong

The District Court, established in 1953, is the intermediate court of Hong Kong. It has limited jurisdiction in both civil and criminal matters. With effect from 3 December 2018, it has civil jurisdiction to hear monetary claims up to $3 million; or where the claims are for the recovery of land, of which the annual rent or rateable value does not exceed $320,000. In its criminal jurisdiction, the court may try the more serious cases, with the main exceptions of murder, manslaughter and rape. The maximum term of imprisonment it may impose is seven years. There are one Chief District Judge and 30 District Judges, among which three District Judges sit in the Family Court and two District Judges sit in the Lands Tribunal as Presiding Officers.

=== Forms of Address ===
District Judges are always referred to directly in court as "Your Honour", and indirectly (orally or in writing) as "His/Her Honour Judge ...". The Chief District Judge may be referred to in writing by adding the post-nominal "CDJ" and the Principal Family Court Judge by adding the post-nominal "PFCJ". Other District Court Judges are referred to in writing by adding the pre-nominal "HHJ ...".

Deputy District Court Judges may be referred to directly in court as "Your Honour" but indirectly (orally or in writing) they are referred to as "Deputy District Judge ...".

=== Family Court ===
The Family Court is a division of the District Court which is assigned by the Chief Justice to deal with Family cases. Under section 10A of the Matrimonial Causes Ordinance (Cap.179), all family and matrimonial proceedings commence in the District Court (and are assigned to the Family Court). A Family judge may transfer a case to the High Court if it involves high monetary value claims and/or highly complex matters of fact or law. By section 10A(3) of the Matrimonial Causes Ordinance, the Family Court may exercise jurisdiction exceeding the District Court's monetary limits.

== The Magistrates' Courts ==
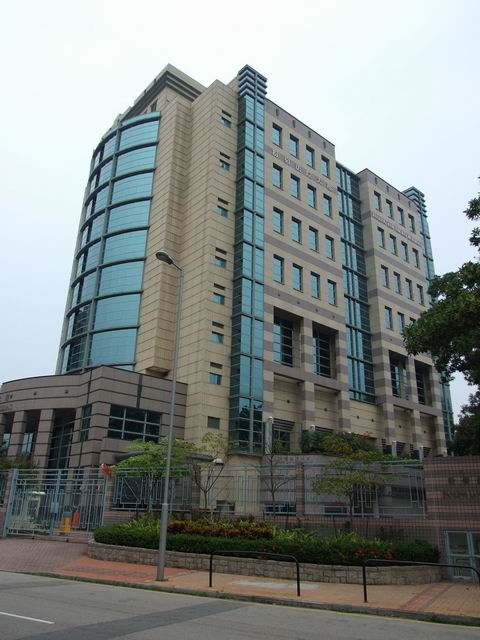
Fanling Magistrates' Court

Magistrates exercise criminal jurisdiction over a wide range of offences. Although there is a general limit of two years imprisonment or a fine of $100,000, certain statutory provisions give Magistrates the power to sentence up to three years imprisonment and to impose a fine up to $5,000,000. Prosecution of all indictable offences commences in the Magistrates' Courts, the Secretary for Justice may apply to have a case transferred to the District Court or committed to the Court of First Instance of the High Court depending on the seriousness of a case. There are approximately 70 Magistrates, sitting in various Tribunals and seven Magistrates' Courts: Eastern, Kowloon City, Kwun Tong, West Kowloon, Sha Tin, Fanling and Tuen Mun. A Principal Magistrate is in charge of each magistracy. The Chief Magistrate, whose chamber is at the Kowloon City Law Courts Building, oversees the work of all magistracies. The most junior judicial role is that of Special Magistrate, typically dealing only with minor offences such as hawking contraventions, traffic offences and other departmental summonses. Appeals against Magistrates' decisions are heard by a Judge of the Court of First Instance.

=== Forms of Address ===
The magistrate are always referred to in court as "Sir" or "Madam" or "Your Worship". Barristers do not generally use the latter to refer to magistrates. In this context, the phrase "Your Worship" is not derived from any religious meaning but from the old English word meaning 'worthy of respect'.

The Chief Magistrate may be referred to in writing by adding the post-nominal "CM", and the Principal Magistrates (presiding over a particular magistrates' court) may be referred to in writing by adding the post-nominal "PM".

== Special courts and tribunals ==
=== The Juvenile Court ===
Courts exercising juvenile jurisdiction are constituted, as the need arises, under the Juvenile Offenders Ordinance (Cap.226) and other statutes. A juvenile court has exclusive jurisdiction to hear charges against children (aged under 14) and young persons (aged between 14 and 16) for any offence other than homicide. Children under 10 are exempted from criminal responsibility. It also has power to deal with care and protection cases involving young people aged up to 18.

A permanent magistrate may sit as a juvenile court and special procedures apply. The magistrate explains the alleged offence to the child or young person in simple language and provides assistance to the defendant in the conduct of the case. Press coverage of the proceedings in juvenile court is restricted, preventing disclosure of the identity of the defendant. The Juvenile Court sits in the Eastern, Kowloon City, West Kowloon, Fanling and Tuen Mun Magistrates' Courts.

=== The Coroner's Court ===
Coroners are empowered to investigate unnatural or suspicious deaths occurring in Hong Kong (and deaths occurring outside Hong Kong if the body is found within Hong Kong). Except when death occurs while the individual is in custody, or the Secretary for Justice directs, the Coroner decides whether or not to hold an inquest with or without a jury. The inquest is mandatory with a jury where the death occurs in custody. The main purpose of an inquest is to ascertain the cause of and the circumstances connected with the death. If appropriate, a Coroner or a jury may make recommendations designed to prevent the recurrence of the fatality under investigation. The Court is situated at West Kowloon Law Courts Building.

=== The Lands Tribunal ===
One of the important functions of the Lands Tribunal is to adjudicate claims by landlords for possession of premises, the tenancies or sub-tenancies of which are under the Landlord and Tenant (Consolidation) Ordinance (Cap. 7). Starting from 9 July 2004, the Tribunal also has power to adjudicate claims for possession of premises, the tenancies or sub-tenancies of which have expired by effluxion of time even when they are outside the said Ordinance. The Tribunal also has power to grant consequential relief. Another widely used jurisdiction of this Tribunal is to determine building management disputes. Such disputes arise from, among others, the interpretation and enforcement of the provisions of the Building Management Ordinance (Cap. 344) and deeds of mutual covenant, the appointment or dissolution of management committees, requisitions for owners' meetings and appointment of building management agent. The Tribunal also has unlimited jurisdiction to determine the amount of compensation payable by the Government to a person whose land has been compulsorily resumed or has suffered a reduction in value because of public developments. The Tribunal can also order the sale of land for redevelopment purpose under the Land (Compulsory Sale for Redevelopment) Ordinance (Cap. 545). The Tribunal also exercises appellate jurisdiction over (i) determinations by the Commissioner of Rating and Valuation under the Rating Ordinance (Cap. 116); (ii) determinations by the Director of Lands under the Government Rent (Assessment and Collection) Ordinance (Cap. 515); and (iii) determinations by the Director of Housing under the Housing Ordinance (Cap. 283). In exercising its jurisdiction, the Tribunal has the same powers to grant remedies and relief, legal or equitable, as the Court of First Instance of the High Court. Parties may appoint counsel or solicitors to appear before the Tribunal or, as is often the case, they may appear in person. The tribunal has a President who is a Judge of the Court of First Instance. There are currently two Presiding Officers who are District Judges, and three members.

=== The Labour Tribunal ===
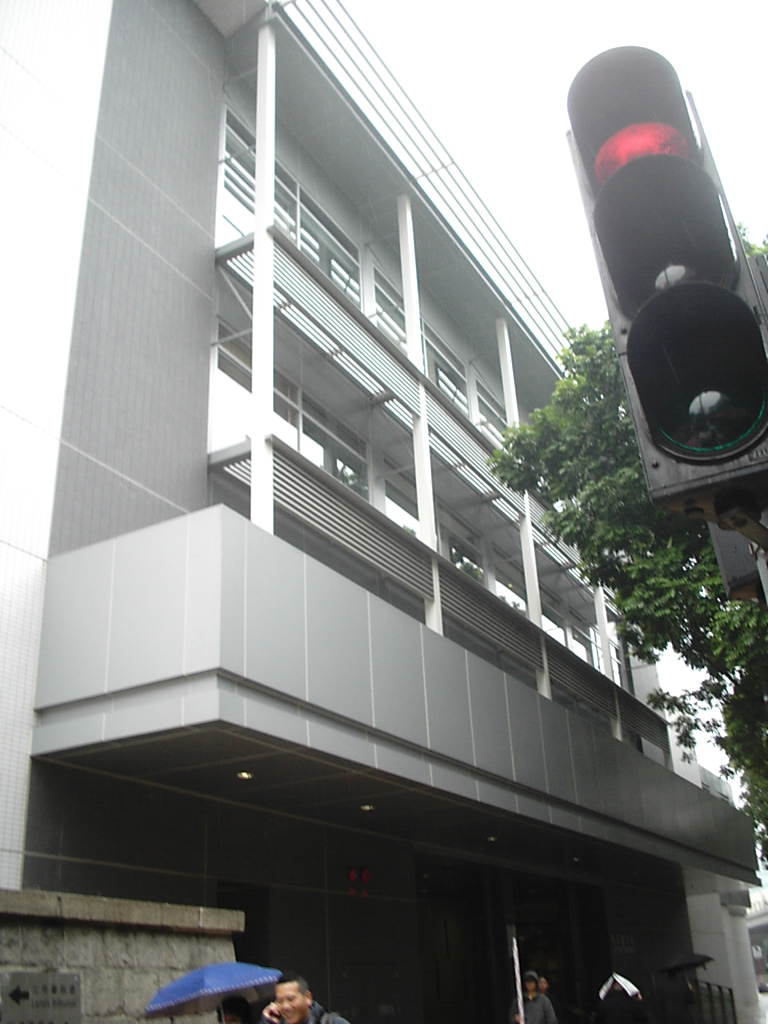
The Labour Tribunal on 36 Gascoigne Road, Kowloon

The Labour Tribunal was set up in 1973 to provide a quick, inexpensive and informal procedure for adjudicating disputes between employees and employers. It deals with claims arising out of a breach of a contract of employment. Claims may include wages in lieu of notice, arrears of wages, statutory holiday pay, annual leave pay, sickness allowance, maternity leave pay, bonus/double pay, severance pay, and long service payments. Claimants can also seek orders for reinstatement or re-engagement; for awards of compensation or terminal payments. Proceedings are mostly conducted in Cantonese before a Presiding Officer. Legal representation is not allowed. Any party aggrieved may appeal on a point of law to the Court of First Instance. There are approximately 8 Presiding Officers, including one Principal Presiding Officer. The tribunal is located at the South Kowloon Law Courts Building in Gascoigne Road. No statistics are provided by the Judiciary on actual waiting times from filing of a claim to first day of trial or ultimate resolution.

=== The Market Misconduct Tribunal ===
The Market Misconduct Tribunal (MMT) was established in 2003 under the provisions contained in the SFO. In accordance with the SFO, if it appears to the Securities and Futures Commission (SFC) that market misconduct or a breach of a disclosure requirement under Part XIVA of the SFO has or may have taken place, the SFC may institute proceedings before the MMT. The MMT has jurisdiction to hear and determine any question or issue arising out of or in connection with the proceedings instituted under the SFO.

=== The Small Claims Tribunal ===
The Small Claims Tribunal was established in 1976. It deals with monetary claims arising from contract or tort, involving amounts not exceeding $75,000. Hearings are informal and usually conducted in Cantonese. Legal representation is not allowed. Parties may authorise a representative (other than a lawyer) to appear in court. Any party aggrieved by the decision of an Adjudicator may appeal on a point of law to the Court of First Instance. There are approximately nine Adjudicators, including a Principal Adjudicator. The Small Claims Tribunal is situated at West Kowloon Law Courts Building.

=== The Obscene Articles Tribunal ===
The Control of Obscene and Indecent Articles Ordinance came into force in 1987 providing for the establishment of the Obscene Articles Tribunal. The work of this tribunal covers two main aspects. Firstly, it is responsible for the classification of articles submitted by any public officer, author, printer, manufacturer, publisher, distributor, copyright owner etc. Secondly, the tribunal has exclusive jurisdiction to determine the question of obscenity or indecency when this issue arises in any civil or criminal proceedings in any court. The Obscene Articles Tribunal consists of a Magistrate and two or more lay adjudicators. Lay adjudicators are selected from a panel consisting of members of the public. The tribunal is situated at West Kowloon Law Courts Building.

=== The Competition Tribunal ===
The Competition Tribunal was set up by the Competition Ordinance in 2013 to deal with the legal proceedings concerning competition matters. Unlike the other tribunals, the Competition Tribunal is a superior court of record and enjoys the same powers, rights and privileges of the Court of First Instance. It also has the same jurisdiction to grant remedies and reliefs as the Court of First Instance. The Tribunal is made up by all judges of the Court of First Instance, and is headed by a president and a deputy president, which they are also judges of the Court of First Instance.

== Judges ==
=== Judicial appointments ===
Judges and judicial officers are not civil servants, and the method and terms of their appointment are different from that of the Civil Service. Judges and judicial officers are appointed by the Chief Executive of the HKSAR after receiving secret advice and recommendations from the Judicial Officers Recommendation Commission. The scope of appointees covers all those who preside over the Court of Final Appeal, Court of Appeal, Court of First Instance, District Court, Family Court, Magistrates' Courts, Lands Tribunal, Labour Tribunal, Small Claims Tribunal, Coroners' Courts and Competition Tribunal. The commission is a statutory body established under the Judicial Officers Recommendation Commission Ordinance and composed of the Chief Justice, Secretary for Justice (themselves appointed to office by the Chief Executive) and seven others appointed by the Chief Executive of the HKSAR: two judges, one barrister, one solicitor and three other persons unconnected with legal practice. Appointed members serve terms of two years and can be re-appointed for further terms. Decisions are made with a maximum of two dissenters on any vote. Apart from providing a certificate or testimonial in respect of a candidate, provision of any other unsolicited information to any member is likely to be considered an attempt to influence that member's deliberation and result in criminal prosecution and imprisonment for two years.

Per Article 90 of the Basic Law, appointments to the offices of Chief Justice and Chief Judge of the High Court additionally require the endorsement of the Legislative Council.

=== Special Designation as National Security Law Judges ===
In Hong Kong, cases related to national security are adjudicated before specifically designated judges. These judges are chosen by the Chief Executive among incumbent magistrates and judges at each level of the judicial hierarchy. Before granting the special designation, the Chief Executive may consult the Chief Justice and the Committee for Safeguarding National Security. The tenure of office as a designated judge is one year.

=== Style and dress ===
Hong Kong judges wear British-style outfits, including wigs made of horsehair, with white gloves, girdles and scarlet-coloured robes added for official ceremonies.

In the lower courts, magistrates are addressed as "your Worship", "Sir" or "Madam", and district court judges as "your Honour". In the superior courts of record, namely the Court of Final Appeal, the High Court (which consists of the Court of Appeal and the Court of First Instance), and the Competition Tribunal, judges are addressed as "my Lord" or "my Lady" and referred to as "his Lordship" or "her Ladyship", following the English tradition. Masters of the High Court are addressed as "Master". When trials are conducted in Chinese, judges were addressed, in Cantonese, as Faat Gwoon Dai Yan (法官大人, "Judge, your Lordship") before the transfer of sovereignty from the United Kingdom to China, and as Faat Gwoon Gok Ha (法官閣下, "Judge, your Honour") since 1997.

For the Court of Final Appeal, the post-nominal letters CJ are used for the chief justice, PJ for permanent judges and NPJ for non-permanent judges; in the High Court, CJHC for the chief judge, JA for justices of appeal and J for full judges of the Court of First Instance. There is no similar form for the many deputy judges or the registrar of the High Court or for judicial officers of lower courts.

=== Judicial oath ===
All judges, including non-permanent judges from other common law jurisdictions, are required to swear an oath to uphold the Basic Law and to bear allegiance to the Hong Kong Special Administrative Region. The following is the text of the oath:

I swear that, in the Office of a Judge/a judicial officer of the Judiciary of the Hong Kong Special Administrative Region of the People's Republic of China, I will uphold the Basic Law of the Hong Kong Special Administrative Region of the People's Republic of China, bear allegiance to the Hong Kong Special Administrative Region of the People's Republic of China, serve the Hong Kong Special Administrative Region conscientiously, dutifully, in full accordance with the law, honestly and with integrity, safeguard the law and administer justice without fear or favour, self-interest or deceit. — Part V, Schedule 2, Oaths and Declarations Ordinance (Cap. 11)

=== Judicial salaries ===
Judges and judicial officers are paid according to the Judicial Service Pay Scale, which is subject to a yearly review by Chief Executive-in-Council acting on the recommendation of Standing Committee on Judicial Salaries and Conditions of Service. As of 1 April 2024, the pay scale is as follows:

JSPS Point	Salary (monthly)	Rank
19	$411,500	Chief Justice
18	$399,950	Permanent Judge of the Court of Final Appeal Chief Judge of the High Court
17	$360,650	Justice of Appeal
16	$343,750	Judge of the Court of First Instance
15	$278,750	Registrar of the High Court Chief Judge of the District Court
14	$269,650; $261,850; $254,200	Senior Deputy Registrar of the High Court; Principal Family Court Judge, District Court
13	$252,500; $245,250; $238,150	Deputy Registrar, High Court; District Court Judge; Chief Magistrate
12	$217,450; $211,200; $204,900	Assistant Registrar, High Court; Member, Lands Tribunal
11	$200,100; $194,550; $188,750	Registrar of the District Court; Principal Adjudicator, Small Claims Tribunal; Principal Magistrate; Principal Presiding Officer, Labour Tribunal
10	$183,150; $177,750; $172,650	Adjudicator, Small Claims Tribunal; Coroner; Deputy Registrar, District Court; Presiding Officer, Labour Tribunal
10	$183,150; $177,750; $172,650	Magistrate
9	$160,305	Magistrate
8	$156,555	Magistrate
7	$152,820	Magistrate
6	$117,365	Special Magistrate
5	$111,920	Special Magistrate
4	$106,725	Special Magistrate
3	$104,235	Special Magistrate
2	$101,765	Special Magistrate
1	$99,335	Special Magistrate

== Judiciary Administration ==
The Judiciary Administration (Chinese: 司法機構政務處) assists the Chief Justice in the overall administration of the Judiciary, providing support to the courts in the administration of justice and their operations. As of 31 March 2025, the Judiciary has an establishment of 2079 posts, consisting of 1863 civil service posts and 216 judges and judicial officers. The budget estimate for the Judiciary in 2025 was 2,806.2 million HKD.

=== Judiciary Administrator ===
Judiciary Administrator
- 司法機構政務長
- Incumbent; Esther Leung, JP since 20 July 2020
- Judiciary Administration
- Appointer: Chief Justice
- Inaugural holder: Alice Tai Yuen-ying
- Formation: 1994

The Judiciary Administration is headed by a Judiciary Administrator (Chinese: 司法機構政務長), who is appointed by the Chief Justice. The position is typically filled by a staff-grade Administrative Officer, and is graded at DPS 8, equivalent to a permanent secretary. The Judiciary Administrator is assisted by three Deputy Judiciary Administrators, who are also Administrative Officers.

The post was created in 1994 with the responsibility of modernising the judiciary. The South China Morning Post reported at the time that the creation of the civil service post caused some discontent among the "conservative" judges, who were concerned about administrative interference with judicial independence and the Judiciary being influenced by "outsiders".

Esther Leung JP, who was previously Director of Administration, has been Judiciary Administrator since 20 July 2020.

==== List of Judiciary Administrators ====
No.	Name	Tenure start	Tenure end	Term length	Other offices held
1	Alice Tai Yuen-ying, GBS JP	1994	30 March 1999		Ombudsman (1999–2009) Director of Intellectual Property (1990–1994)
2	Wilfred Tsui Chi-keung	15 June 1999	15 June 2005		Deputy Director of the Hospital Authority (1991–1999) Administrative Officer (1979–1991)
3	Emma Lau Yin-wah, JP	15 June 2005	16 July 2020		Administrative Officer (1982–2008) Deputy Secretary (Financial Services), Financial Services and the Treasury Bureau (2004–2005) Deputy Judiciary Administrator (Development) (1999–2004) Deputy Secretary for the Treasury (1997–1999)
4	Esther Leung Yuet-yin, JP	20 July 2020	Incumbent		Director of Administration (2019–2020) Deputy Secretary for Transport and Housing (Housing) and Deputy Director of Housing (Strategy) (2017–2019) Private Secretary to the Chief Executive (2016–2017) Deputy Secretary for Financial Services and the Treasury (Treasury) (2012–2016)

== List of Chief Justices ==
Name	Appointment
John Walter Hulme	1844–1860
Sir William Henry Adams	1860–1866
Sir John Jackson Smale	1866–1882
Sir George Phillippo	1882–1888
Sir James Russell	1888–1892
Sir Fielding Clarke	1892–1896
Sir John Worrell Carrington	1896–1902
Sir William Meigh Goodman	1902–1905
Sir Francis Taylor Piggott	1905–1912
Sir William Rees-Davies	1912–1924
Sir Henry Cowper Gollan	1924–1930
Sir Joseph Horsford Kemp	1930–1934
Sir Atholl MacGregor	1934–1945
Sir Henry William Butler Blackall	1946–1948
Sir Leslie Bertram Gibson	1948–1951
Sir Gerard Lewis Howe	1951–1955
Sir Michael Joseph Patrick Hogan	1955–1970
Sir Ivo Charles Clayton Rigby	1970–1973
Sir Geoffrey Gould Briggs	1973–1978
Sir Denys Tudor Emil Roberts	1978–1988
Sir Ti-liang Yang	1988–1996
Sir Noel Plunkett Power	1996 (interim)
Andrew Li Kwok-nung	1 July 1997 – 31 August 2010
Geoffrey Ma Tao-li	1 September 2010 – 10 January 2021
Andrew Cheung Kui-nung	11 January 2021 – present

== See also ==
- Law of Hong Kong
- Judiciary of England and Wales
- Courts of England and Wales
