= Attorney General Gibson =

Attorney General Gibson may refer to:

- Allyson Maynard Gibson (born 1957), Attorney General of the Bahamas
- Ben Gibson (politician) (1882–1949), Attorney General of Iowa
- Charles E. Gibson Jr. (1925–2017), Attorney General of Vermont
- John George Gibson (1846–1923), Attorney-General for Ireland
- John Morison Gibson (1842–1929), Attorney General of Ontario
- Leslie Gibson (judge) (1896–1952), Attorney General of Palestine
- Walter M. Gibson (1822–1888), Acting Attorney General of Kingdom of Hawaii

== See also ==
- General Gibson (disambiguation)
