= Lee Yiu Hong v Well-In Hotel Supplies Company Limited =

2020 Hong Kong Court of First Instance case

- Court of First Instance
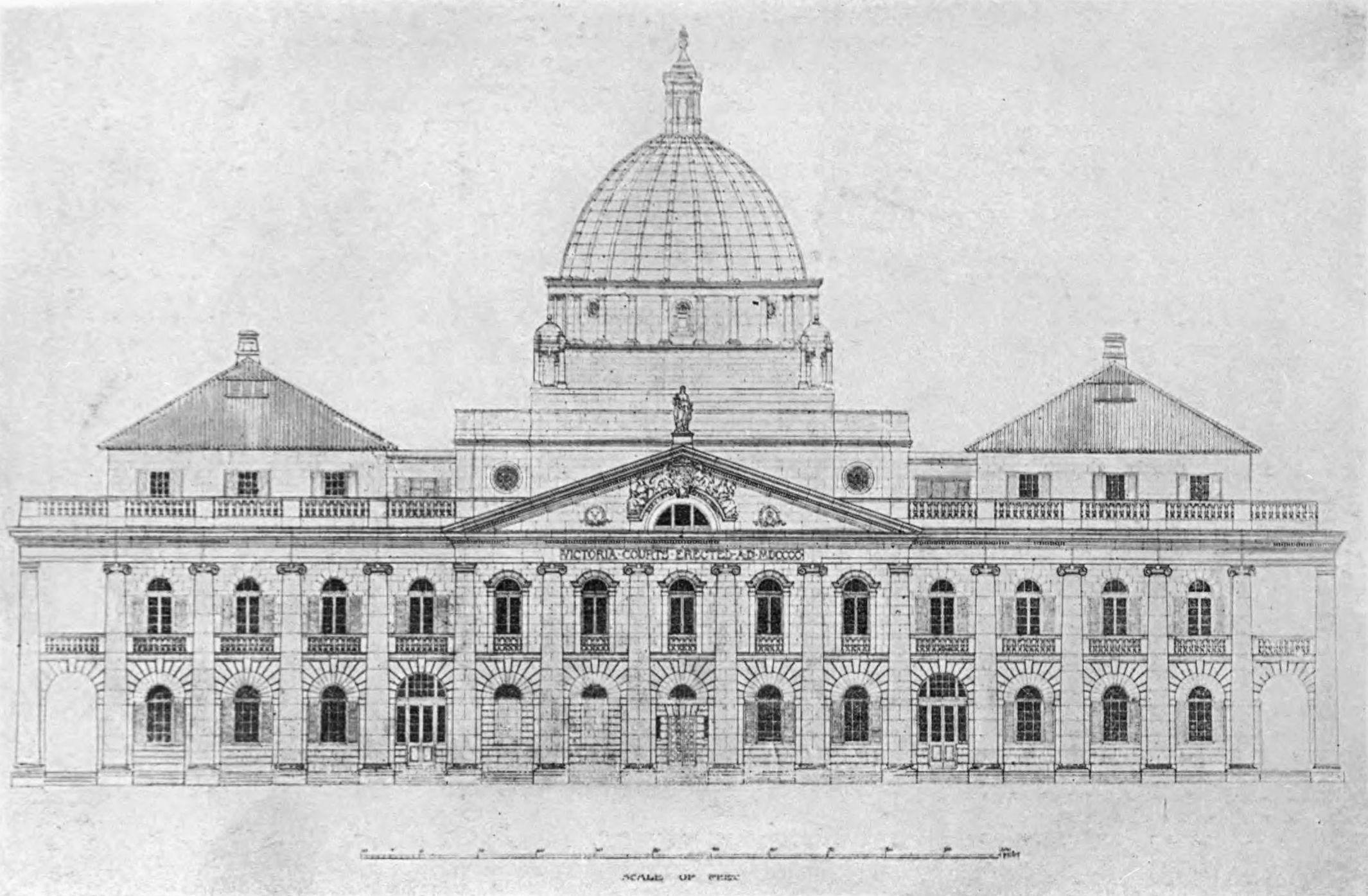
- Argued: 21 October 2020
- Decided: 2 November 2020
- Case numbers: HCLA 9/2020
- Neutral citation: [2020] HKCFI 2760

Case history
- Appealed from: Lee Yiu Hong v Well-In Hotel Supplies Company Limited LBTC 3925/2018

Lee Yiu Hong v Well-In Hotel Supplies Company Limited is a case heard by the High Court of Hong Kong, which ruled that the jurisdiction of the Labour Tribunal does not encompass all employment disputes; for instance, tort claims fall outside the Tribunal's jurisdiction. The Court of First Instance delivered its judgment on 2 November 2020. Prior to this decision, the Labour Tribunal had ruled in favour of the employee regarding unpaid wages.

== Background ==
The plaintiff, Lee Yiu Hong, served as the Sales Director for the defendant, Well-In Hotel Supplies Company Limited (hereinafter "Well-In"), until his departure in 2018. Later that year, Lee filed a claim with the Labour Tribunal to recover unpaid commissions from Well-In. The Tribunal ruled in favour of the employee regarding the unpaid wages and ordered the employer to pay the employee's costs.

Well-In appealed the decision in 2020, arguing that the Tribunal had failed to discharge its statutory duty by neither investigating nor considering the issues raised by the employer. These issues included the employee's alleged breach of fidelity and fiduciary duties, as well as his interference with the employer's business. Well-In alleged that Lee had disposed of important company documents without authorization, failed to return a computer containing commercial trade secrets, was appointed as a director of a competitor company shortly after his resignation, and, in his capacity as Sales Director, had access to confidential information unknown to other staff. During the proceedings, the Tribunal treated these issues merely as background information, failing to give them adequate consideration to either cancel or reduce the compensation awarded against the defendant. Believing the Tribunal's judgment to be flawed, Well-In lodged an appeal.

== Decision ==
The Court of First Instance dismissed Well-In's appeal.

=== Jurisdiction of the Labour Tribunal ===
The Court reasoned that the claims arising from the employer's allegations did not fall within the jurisdiction of the Labour Tribunal. The Tribunal's jurisdiction is strictly limited to monetary disputes arising from breaches of employment contracts. Consequently, the Tribunal lacked the jurisdiction to hear cases involving tort. Therefore, the Court held there was no impropriety in the Tribunal's decision not to conduct further investigations into these matters, nor did the Tribunal have a duty to transfer the relevant claims to other legal venues.

The case clearly established that if an employee or employer wishes to file a mixed claim based on both contract and tort, the matter should be transferred to a higher court rather than the Labour Tribunal.
