= Attorney General Howe =

Attorney General Howe may refer to:

- Gerard Lewis Howe (1899–1955), Attorney General of Nigeria
- James Henry Howe (1827–1893), Attorney General of Wisconsin

== See also ==
- General Howe (disambiguation)
