= Broughshane =

Village in Northern Ireland

Coordinates: 54.893611°N 6.206111°W

Broughshane: Irish: Bruach Sheáin; Scots: Brochshane
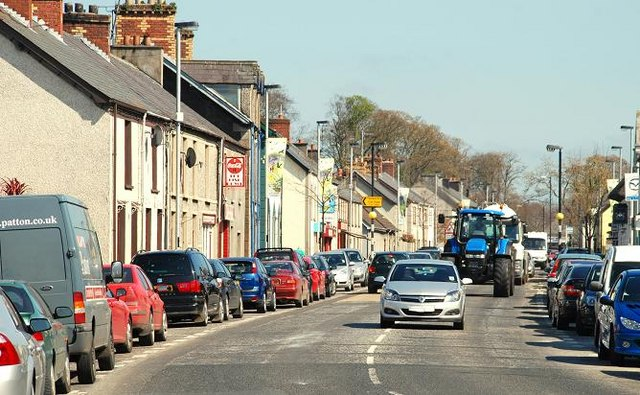

- Location within Northern Ireland
- Population: 3,067 (2021 census)
- District: Mid and East Antrim
- County: County Antrim
- Country: Northern Ireland
- Sovereign state: United Kingdom
- Post town: BALLYMENA
- Postcode district: BT43
- Dialling code: 028
- UK Parliament: North Antrim
- NI Assembly: North Antrim

Broughshane (/brəˈʃeɪn/ brə-SHAYN, formerly spelt Brughshane, from Irish Bruach Sheáin) is a large village in County Antrim, Northern Ireland. It is 3.5 miles (5.6 km) northeast of Ballymena and 13.8 miles (22.2 km) north of Antrim, on the A42 road. It is part of Mid and East Antrim District Council and had a population of 3,067 people in the 2021 census.

Its name comes from the Irish for "Shane's dwelling", and seemingly refers to a castle of Shane mac Brian O'Neill, ruler of the Gaelic territory of Lower Clannaboy from 1595 to 1617, which formerly stood on the north side of the village street. The nearby pub, The Thatch Inn, has a thatched roof and is a Grade B+ listed building.

Broughshane is known as the 'Garden Village of Ulster' with the motto 'People, Plants and Pride growing Together'. In 2018, the village won Channel Four's 'UK Village of the Year'. It has won Ulster in Bloom, Britain in Bloom and Entente Florale (Europe in Bloom). In 2007 and again in 2012, the village won 'Champion of Champions' award in the Britain in Bloom competition. It has also won the All Ireland Tidy Town Award.

Volunteers have established in the area around the village pond, a wildlife area which has some of every species of swan and many rare types of geese etc.

== Sport ==
Broughshane's two football teams, Braid United FC and Raceview FC, play in the Ballymena Saturday Morning League. Both clubs play their home matches at the village's football pitch at Knockan Road. Since 2008, the pitch has also been used as a venue for Milk Cup games.

Ballymena Golf Club, founded in 1903, is located just outside the village.

Ballymena R.F.C.'s rugby grounds are on the road linking Ballymena to Broughshane.

== Demographics ==
Broughshane had a population of 3,067 people in the 2021 census, of whom:

- 21.9% were under 20 years old and 18.7% were aged 70 and above;
- 47.7% of the population were male and 52.3% were female; and
- 4.1% were from a Catholic community background and 77.5% were from a 'Protestant and Other Christian (including Christian related)' community background.

== Notable people ==
- Broughshane was the ancestral home of Sir George White VC, the most decorated soldier in the British Army and the hero of the Siege of Ladysmith. There is a memorial in the Presbyterian Church graveyard.
- His son, Captain James Robert "Jack" White", co-founded the Irish Citizen Army during the Dublin Lockout and later went on to fight the Fascist uprising in the Spanish Civil War.
- Sir James Russell, Chief Justice of Hong Kong, was from Broughshane and is buried there.
- Guy Wilson, horticulturalist and nurseryman.
- Actor James Nesbitt grew up in Broughshane before moving to Coleraine.
- Ireland national rugby union team and British and Irish Lions rugby player David Humphreys, from Broughshane, winning the Triple Crown and captaining the Barbarian F.C. in his illustrious career.
- Ulster Rugby player Ian Humphreys, brother of David Humphreys is from Broughshane.
- British & Irish Lions, Ireland national rugby union, Barbarian F.C, Ulster Rugby & Ballymena RFC rugby player Steve Smith lives in Broughshane, Ballymena
- Darts player Josh Rock
