= General Howe (disambiguation) =

General Howe refers to William Howe, 5th Viscount Howe (1729–1814), Commander-in-Chief of British forces during the American War of Independence. General Howe may also refer to:

- Albion P. Howe (1818–1897), Union Army brigadier general and brevet major general
- Emanuel Howe (British Army officer) (c. 1663 – 1709), British Army lieutenant general
- George Howe, 3rd Viscount Howe (1725–1758), British Army general
- John H. Howe (judge) (1801–1873), Union Army brevet brigadier general
- Richard Curzon-Howe, 3rd Earl Howe (1822–1900), British peer and professional soldier
- Robert Howe (Continental Army officer) (1732–1786), Continental Army general during the American Revolutionary War
- William F. Howe (general) (1888–1952), U.S. Army brigadier general

== See also ==
- Attorney General Howe (disambiguation)
