= Geoffrey Briggs =

Chief Justice of Hong Kong

The Honourable Dato Setia Sir Geoffrey Briggs DSNB QC
- Chief Justice of Hong Kong

1st Chief Justice of Brunei
- In office 1963 – 18 June 1979
- Nominated by: Omar Ali Saifuddien III
- Preceded by: Office established
- Succeeded by: Denys Roberts

19th Chief Justice of Hong Kong
- In office 1973–1978
- Preceded by: Ivo Rigby
- Succeeded by: Denys Roberts

14th Chief Judicial Commissioner for the Western Pacific
- In office 1962–1965
- Preceded by: Albert Lowe
- Succeeded by: Jocelyn Bodilly

Personal details
- Born: Geoffrey Gould Briggs; 6 May 1914 Amersham, Buckinghamshire, England
- Died: 12 May 1993 (aged 79) Bath, Somerset, England
- Education: Christ Church (BA; BCL)
- Occupation: Judge and law officer

Military service
- Allegiance: United Kingdom
- Branch/service: British Army
- Rank: Major
- Battles/wars: World War II

Sir Geoffrey Gould Briggs QC (6 May 1914 – 12 May 1993) was an English lawyer and judge. He was Chief Justice of the Supreme Court of Hong Kong in the 1970s and of Brunei in the 1980s.

== Early life ==
Briggs was born in 1914, the second son of Reverend C. E. Briggs of Amersham, Buckinghamshire. He was educated at Sherborne School and Christ Church, Oxford where he took the degrees of Bachelor of Arts and Bachelor of Civil Law. He was called to the bar of Gray's Inn in 1938. He served during World War II as a Major in the County of London Yeomanry.

== Legal career ==
In 1954, Briggs was appointed Attorney General of Eastern Nigeria. He was appointed a Queen's Counsel for Nigeria in 1955. In 1958, he was appointed Puisne Judge of the Unified Judiciary of Sarawak, North Borneo and Brunei. He served there until 1962 when he was appointed Chief Judicial Commissioner for the Western Pacific.

In 1965, he was appointed Puisne Judge in Hong Kong and later promoted to Chief Justice of Hong Kong in 1973 upon the retirement of Ivo Rigby. In that position, he served concurrently as Chief Justice of Brunei. He served as Chief Justice of Brunei and Hong Kong until 1979. He was knighted in the 1974 New Year Honours.

== Later years ==
Briggs retired to England in 1979. He continued to serve in a number of judicial roles in retirement, including President of the Brunei Court of Appeals (1979–1988), Justice of Appeal, Court of Appeal, Gibraltar (1983 to 1988) and President of the Pensions Appeal Tribunal for England and Wales (1980 to 1987). He died in Bath in 1993.

== Honours ==
- Order of Setia Negara Brunei Second Class (DSNB; 1973) – Dato Setia

Legal offices
Preceded by Office established	Chief Justice of Brunei; 1963-1979	Succeeded by Sir Denys Roberts
Preceded by Sir Ivo Rigby	Chief Justice of Hong Kong; 1973-1978	Succeeded by Sir Denys Roberts
Preceded by Sir Albert Lowe	Chief Judicial Commissioner for the Western Pacific; 1962-1965	Succeeded by Sir Jocelyn Bodilly
