= General Gibson =

General Gibson may refer to:

- George Gibson (Commissary General) (1775–1861), U.S. Army brevet major general, and the first Commissary General of Subsistence
- John Gibson (American soldier) (1740–1822), Allegheny County Militia major general in various military engagements
- Randall L. Gibson (1832–1892), Confederate States Army brigadier general

== See also ==
- Attorney General Gibson (disambiguation)
