= Maurice Heenan =

Hong Kong Attorney General

Attorney General of Hong Kong
- In office 1961–1966
- Preceded by: Arthur Ridehalgh
- Succeeded by: Sir Denys Tudor Emil Roberts

Personal details
- Born: 8 October 1912 Wyndham, Southland, New Zealand
- Died: 26 September 2000 (aged 87) New Canaan, Connecticut, USA
- Education: University of Canterbury

Maurice Heenan CMG QC (8 October 1912 – 26 September 2000) was a New Zealand-born barrister and solicitor, who served as Attorney General of Hong Kong and as a senior lawyer for the United Nations.

== Early life ==
Born to David Donnoghue Heenan (died 1942), and Ann Heenan (née Frame; died 1976), Heenan attended Ashburton High School and then the Canterbury College, University of New Zealand, earning an LLB. Heenan was a barrister and solicitor of the Supreme Court of New Zealand from 1937 through 1939. From 1940 to 1946 he was a major in the 2nd NZEF and saw active service in the Western Desert, Libya, Cyrenaica and Italy and was mentioned in dispatches. In 1944, he was selected to attend Staff College, Camberley in the UK where he was awarded the Staff College Award.

It was in London that he met his future wife, Claire Gabriela Stephanie (née Ciho), daughter of Emil Ciho (died 1975) and Irene (née Rotbauer; died 1950) of Trenčín, Bratislava, Czechoslovakia. Claire Ciho, who was attending a summer course for foreign students at Oxford, was one of the first students permitted by the Czechoslovak government to attend a foreign college after the war.. The couple wed in 1951; they had two daughters.

== Overseas legal career ==
In 1946, Heenan was appointed to British Overseas Civil Service and was Crown Counsel for the Palestine Mandate in Jerusalem until 1948. He was transferred to Hong Kong in 1948 and in 1952 was appointed Senior Crown Counsel. He acted as Solicitor General of Hong Kong and Attorney General of Hong Kong at various times. In 1961 he was appointed, first Solicitor General of Hong Kong and then, two months later, Attorney General of Hong Kong. He served as Attorney General until 1966. He was appointed Queen's Counsel in 1962 while serving as Attorney General.

In 1966, he became the Deputy Director of the General Legal Division (United Nations Office of Legal Affairs), Offices of the Secretary General, United Nations. On his departure from Hong Kong Michael Gass, the Acting Governor, thanked Heenan for his service at the last meeting of the Legislative Council he attended.

Heenan served as Deputy Director of the General Legal Division until 1973, when he was named General Counsel for the United Nations Relief and Works Agency (UNRWA) for Palestinian Refugees in Beirut, Lebanon.

== Awards ==
In 1966 he was inducted into the Order of St. Michael and St. George (CMG) at Buckingham Palace in London.

== Clubs and recreations ==
In Hong Kong, he was a member of the Hong Kong Club, the Hong Kong Cricket Club and Hong Kong Lawn Tennis Association. He was also a voting member of the Hong Kong Jockey Club. He was a member of the Country Club of New Canaan in America.

His recreations included rugby, tennis, squash, skiing and golf.

== Last years and death ==
In 1977, he retired to his home in New Canaan, Connecticut. He died in 2000, aged 87, and was survived by his wife, two daughters and several grandchildren.

== Sources ==
- Debrett's Distinguished People of Today; edited by David Williamson & Patricia Ellis. Debrett's Peerage Ltd.: 1988, ISBN 0905649990 p. 497
- Who's Who U.K.–An Annual Biographical Dictionary published annually since 1849. A & C Black: London, England, 2000, ISBN 9780713651584 p. 928
- Encyclopedia of New Zealand 1966; site visited 2 August 2009.
- Who is Who in the United Nations and Related Agencies. Arno Press/A New York Times Company: New York, U.S., 1975, p. 247; site visited 2 August 2009
- Debrett's Handbook (eds Suzanne Duke, Dawn Henderson, Antonia Gaisford-St. Lawrence), Debrett's Peerage Ltd.: London, England, 1984, p. 904

Legal offices
Preceded by Arthur Ridehalgh	Attorney General of Hong Kong; 1962–1966	Succeeded by Sir Denys Roberts
