= James Russell (Hong Kong judge) =

Chief Justice of Hong Kong

Sir James Russell CMG
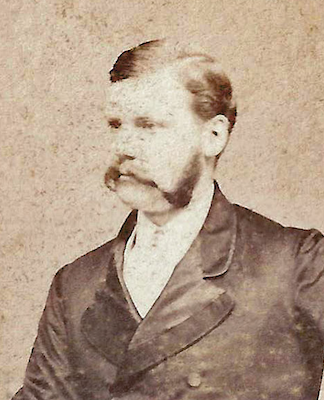

Chief Justice of Hong Kong
- In office 1888–1892
- Preceded by: Sir George Phillippo
- Succeeded by: Sir Fielding Clarke

Personal details
- Born: 22 November 1842 Broughshane, County Antrim, Ireland
- Died: 1 September 1893 (aged 50) Strathpeffer, Scotland
- Resting place: Broughshane, County Antrim, Northern Ireland

Sir James Russell CMG (22 November 1842 – 1 September 1893) was an Irish colonial administrator in Hong Kong and served as Chief Justice of Hong Kong from 1888 to 1892.

== Early life ==
The third son of John Russell, Russell was born on 22 November 1842 in Broughshane, County Antrim in Ulster, Ireland, and graduated with a Bachelor of Arts from The Queen's University of Ireland in 1863.

== Career in Hong Kong ==
Russell joined the Hong Kong Civil Service as a cadet in 1865. He was appointed a Government Interpreter in 1867. In 1868, he was appointed as private secretary to his fellow Irishman, Sir Richard Graves MacDonnell, the Governor of Hong Kong. He ably assisted Governor MacDonnell in dealing with the "blockade of Hong Kong", where the Viceroy of Guangdong and Guangxi ordered four customs stations to be established in waterways surrounding Hong Kong and Kowloon at Fat Tong Chau, Ma Wan, Cheung Chau and Kowloon Walled City in what was then Chinese territory.

In 1870, he was appointed as Police Magistrate.

In 1874, after reading for the bar at Dublin University, taking the gold medal, he was called to the bar at Lincoln's Inn.

He continued to hold the position of Police Magistrate until 1881 during which term he acted twice as Attorney General for Hong Kong. He acted as Puisne Judge of the Supreme Court during Chief Justice John Smale's leave of absence in 1878, and again in 1881 and 1883, taking the opportunity to sentence numerous prisoners to floggings.

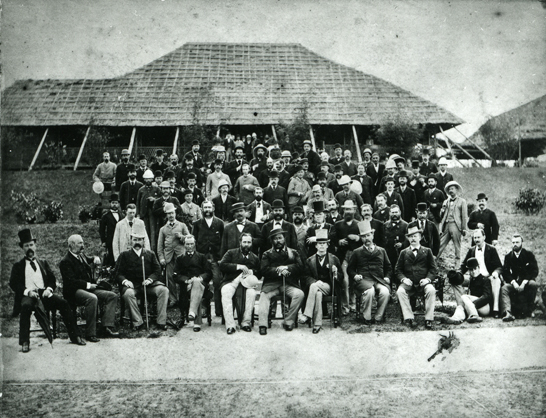
Hawaiian King Kalakaua visits Hong Kong in 1881. Russell appears to sitting immediately to the right of the photo to Governor Hennessy

Between 1881 and 1883, Russell served as Colonial Treasurer and Registrar-General.

Russell acted as Chief Justice of the Supreme Court of Hong Kong in 1884, 1886 and 1887 during absences on leave of the Chief Justice.

He was appointed a CMG in 1887 in recognition of his work on the Mixed Commission appointed under the Chefoo Convention to seek to resolve the Chinese customs blockade of Hong Kong.

On the retirement of Sir George Phillippo in October 1888, Russell was appointed Chief Justice of Hong Kong. Plagued by long periods of illness, he went on leave in March 1892 and resigned later that year, unable to resume his duties.

Russell was knighted in 1890. He never married.

Russell was described as: "one of the most hard working officials that the Hongkong Civil Service has ever possessed, and with his industry were united great natural shrewdness and common sense."

As a judge his "keen sense of justice, his firmness, and his unfailing courtesy commanded for him universal respect and confidence, and it was seldom that his judgments could be assailed on points of law or equity."

== Death ==
In 1893, he was staying in Strathpeffer, Scotland, to convalesce. He was joined there by his old friend Sir William Henry Marsh, who had also been a senior official in Hong Kong. Russell had two heart attacks in the last week of August 1893, but by 1 September 1893 was feeling better and went down for breakfast. He had another heart attack and died a few hours later. He was 50 years old at the time.

His body was taken back to Ulster by his brother and interred in the graveyard of Broughshane First Presbyterian Church in County Antrim.

== Russell Street ==
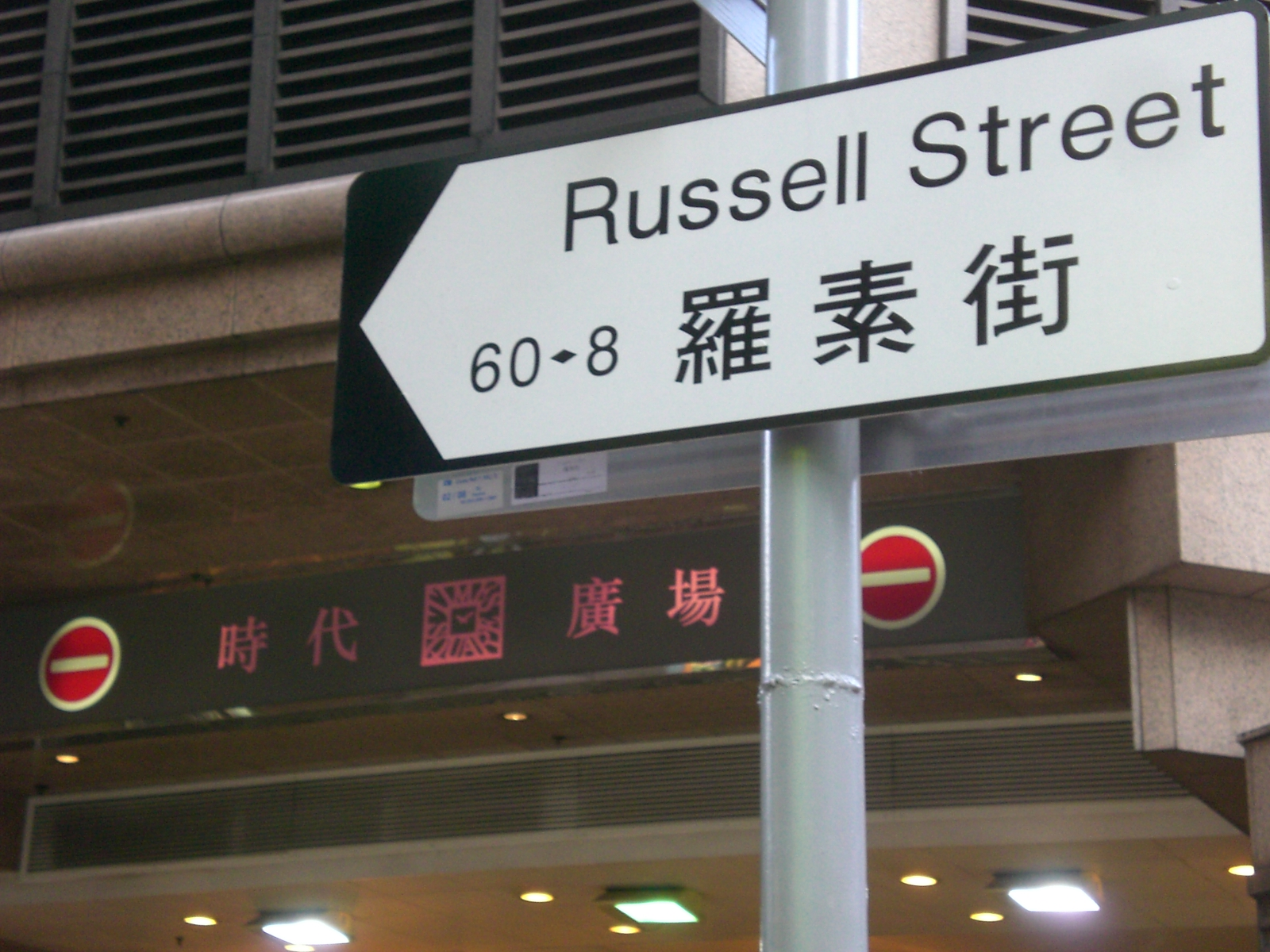
Russell Street, Causeway Bay, Hong Kong. Named after Russell

Russell Street in Causeway Bay, Hong Kong, was named after Russell.

Legal offices
Preceded by George Phillippo	Chief Justice of hong Kong; 1888–92	Succeeded by Fielding Clarke
