= Henry Cadman Jones =

English law reporter (1818–1902)

Henry Cadman Jones (1818–1902) was an English law reporter.

== Life ==
Born on 28 June 1818 at New Church in Winwick, Lancashire, he was eldest son of Joseph Jones, at the time vicar of Winwick and later of Repton, Derbyshire, by his wife Elizabeth Joanna Cooper of Derby. Educated privately, he entered Trinity College, Cambridge, in 1837, and graduated B.A. in 1841 as second wrangler and second Smith's prizeman, being elected a fellow in the same year. The senior wrangler and first Smith's prizeman of his tripos was George Gabriel Stokes.

Admitted to Lincoln's Inn on 7 June 1841, and called to the bar on 24 November 1845, Jones became a pupil of Sir John Rolt. He took part in the work of the Religious Tract Society and took part, with Stokes, in the proceedings of the Victoria Institute.

Jones died at St. Matthew's Gardens, St. Leonards-on-Sea, on 18 January 1902, and was buried in Repton churchyard. His portrait was painted by Eden Upton Eddis.

== Works ==
From 1857 until 1865, when the official law reports were founded, Jones was associated with John Peter De Gex in three series of chancery reports. He continued to report chancery appeals for the law reports until within three years of his death. In 1860 he drafted with Josiah William Smith the consolidated orders of the court of chancery and later with Sir Arthur Wilson the rules under the Judicature Acts of 1873 and 1875.

== Family ==
Jones married (1) on 4 September 1851 Anna Maria (died 10 May 1873), daughter of Robert Steevens Harrison of Bourn Abbey, Lincolnshire; (2) on 4 September 1879 Eliza (died 26 October 1909), third daughter of the Rev. Frederick Money of Offham, Kent. By his first wife he had eight children, of whom a son and four daughters survived him.

== Notes ==
Attribution

This article incorporates text from a publication now in the public domain: Lee, Sidney, ed. (1912). "Jones, Henry Cadman". Dictionary of National Biography (2nd supplement). Vol. 2. London: Smith, Elder & Co.
