= Michael Joseph Hogan =

Irish lawyer and Chief Justice of Hong Kong

Sir Michael Hogan, Chief Justice of Hong Kong

Sir Michael Joseph Patrick Hogan, CMG, QC (15 March 1908 – 27 September 1986) was an Irish lawyer and judge in the British Empire. He served as Chief Justice of Hong Kong for 14 years.

== Early life ==
Hogan was born on 15 March 1908 in Dublin, Ireland.

He was educated at Belvedere College, Dublin (1919–1924), and Stonyhurst College, Lancashire (1924–1925). He then attended Trinity College Dublin, where he graduated with a Bachelor of Arts in Legal and Political Science with First Class Honours and was awarded the gold medal. He then studied for a Bachelor of Laws graduating in 1929. He was also a scholar of the college in 1927.

He represented Trinity College in athletics, rugby and tennis.

== Marriage ==
He married Patricia Galliford of Yorkshire in Star of the Sea Church, Steamer Point, Aden, in 1945.

== Legal career ==
He was admitted as a solicitor in Dublin in 1930 and practised with Maxwell and Weldon of Dublin for less than a year. He then moved to Nairobi, Kenya, where he practised for five years with the firm of Daly & Figgis.

In 1936, he qualified as a barrister at law at the Irish Bar (King's Inns). He was appointed Chief Magistrate in Palestine and was based in Haifa and then Jerusalem in 1937. Soon after, he was appointed Crown Counsel in Palestine.

At the end of World War II, in 1945, he was appointed Attorney General in Aden. He was appointed a King's Counsel while in Aden.

At the end of 1946, he returned to Jerusalem as Solicitor General and stayed in that position until the termination of the Mandate of Palestine in May 1948. He remained in Palestine to advise the British forces there until they were withdrawn in July 1948. He then acted as a legal adviser to the Foreign Office in London.

He was appointed Solicitor General of the Federation of Malaya in August 1950 and in December of that year was promoted to Attorney General. He briefly acted as Administrator of Malaya when Sir Henry Gurney, High Commissioner for Malaya, was assassinated by Malayan bandits near Fraser's Hill. Hogan was made a Queen's Counsel in 1952. He was awarded a CMG in the 1953 New Year Honours.

He was appointed Chief Justice of Hong Kong in 1955. From 1964, he concurrently held the post of Chief Justice of Brunei.

He was appointed as joint commissioner to the Commission of inquiry into the Hong Kong Disturbances in 1966 (Hong Kong 1966 riots).

== Military Appointments ==
Hogan enlisted as a private in the Kenya Defence Force in 1930 and retired with the rank of captain in 1936. He also served in the Palestine Volunteer Defence Force, Jerusalem from 1940 until it was disbanded in August 1943.

== Retirement ==
Hogan retired to England at the end of 1969 and was seen off at Queen's Pier on 31 December 1969. His ship sailed from Hong Kong the following morning. His appointment as Chief Justice of Brunei ceased on 13 January 1970.

He sat as a member of a number of Courts of Appeal of small members of the British Commonwealth after retirement, including the Court of Appeal of the Bahamas (1975 to 1978) and the Seychelles Court of Appeal.

He died on 27 September 1986.

Legal offices
Preceded by Sir Gerard L Howe	Chief Justice of Hong Kong; 1955-1970	Succeeded by Sir Ivo Rigby
