= West Indian Court of Appeal =

Defunct appellate court

The West Indian Court of Appeal (WICA) was a court which served as the appellate court for the British colonies of British Guiana, Barbados, the Leeward and Windward Islands, and Trinidad and Tobago from 1919 until the creation of the Federal Supreme Court of the West Indies Federation in 1958.

== History ==
West Indian Court of Appeal Act 1919 (Note: Section 8(1).)
- Act of Parliament
- Parliament of the United Kingdom
- Long title: An Act to provide for the establishment of a Court of Appeal for certain of His Majesty's Colonies in the West Indies.
- Citation: 9 & 10 Geo. 5. c. 47
- Territorial extent: United Kingdom

Dates
- Royal assent: 15 August 1919
- Commencement: 1 July 1920 (Note: Section 8(3).)
- Repealed: 18 April 1962
Other legislation
Repeals/revokes	Windward Islands Appeal Court Act 1889
Repealed by	West Indies Act 1962

Status: Repealed

Text of statute as originally enacted

The West Indian Court of Appeal Bill got its second reading in July 1919, having been moved by the Undersecretary of State Lt. Col. Amery. The Bill proposed that the Chief Justice of Trinidad would be the president of the court. Governments could choose whether their appeals went to the West Indian Court of Appeal before the Privy Council. The bill was read a third time in August 1919.

The court was created by the West Indian Court of Appeal Act 1919 (9 & 10 Geo. 5. c. 47), an act of the Parliament of the United Kingdom. Decisions of the court could be appealed, with leave, to the Judicial Committee of the Privy Council. The court came into operation in 1920.

== Operations ==
The president of the court was the Chief Justice of Trinidad and Tobago. The associate members of the court were the Chief Justices of British Guiana, Barbados, and the Leeward and Windward Islands.

The court was constituted by any 3 justices. The need to assemble chief justices from the various territories. often led to delay.

The Principal Registrar of the Trinidad and Tobago served as registrar for the court.

=== Presidents ===
- Sir Philip James MacDonnell, Chief Justice of Trinidad and Tobago and President of the West Indian Court of Appeal, 1927-1930.
- Charles Frederic Belcher, Chief Justice of Trinidad and Tobago and President of the West Indian Court of Appeal, 1930-unk.
- Sir Henry Blackall, Chief Justice of Trinidad and Tobago and President of the West Indian Court of Appeal, 1943-48.
- Sir Joseph Mathieu-Perez, Chief Justice of Trinidad and Tobago and President of the West Indian Court of Appeal, c. 1958.

=== Assistant Justices ===
- William Henry Irwin, 1951-54.
- Sir Donald Edward Jackson, Chief Justice of Windward and Leeward Islands and Member of the West Indian Court of Appeal, 1950-unk.
- James Stanley Rae, Chief Justice of Windward and Leeward Islands.
