= Chief Justice of the Supreme Court of Hong Kong =

Most senior judge in British Hong Kong

Chief Justice of Hong Kong
- 香港首席大法官
- Coat of arms of Hong Kong
- Style: The Honourable
- Member of: Supreme Court of Hong Kong
- Residence: 18 Gough Hill Road, The Peak
- Seat: Supreme Court Building
- Appointer: Governor of Hong Kong
- Term length: Tenure until the age of 65
- Formation: 1844
- First holder: John Walter Hulme
- Final holder: Ti-liang Yang
- Deputy: Vice President of the Court of Appeal

The chief justice of Hong Kong was, until 1997, the chief judge (Chinese: 首席按察司, later 首席大法官) of the Court of Appeal of the Supreme Court of Hong Kong and the most senior judge in the court system.

== History ==
=== Supreme Court of Hong Kong ===
The Supreme Court of Hong Kong existed from 1844 (before the establishment of the court (1841-1844), legal proceedings would likely have been undertaken by the British military courts and commanding officers) when British civilian control of Hong Kong commenced until 1997 when Hong Kong was returned to China. Only the last chief justice, Sir Ti-liang Yang, was Chinese by ethnicity (British subject, later a British Dependent Territory citizen); the remainder were all British or Irish, two of whom, Sir James Russell and Sir Joseph H. Kemp, both Irishmen, spoke Chinese.

=== Renaming of the Supreme Court and title in 1997 ===
In 1997, the Supreme Court of Hong Kong was renamed the High Court of Hong Kong. The position was accordingly changed to Chief Judge of the High Court, while the role of head of the Hong Kong Judiciary was assumed by the chief justice of the Court of Final Appeal. The Court of Final Appeal was established to replace the role of the Judicial Committee of the Privy Council as Hong Kong's final appellate court.

== Role ==
The chief justice was the head of the Hong Kong judiciary and was the ex-officio president of the Court of Appeal. He also served as a member of the Judicial Service Commission.

== List of pre-1997 chief justices ==
The following table lists former chief justices of the Supreme Court of Hong Kong prior to 1997. See the High Court of Hong Kong for a list of chief judges of the High Court.

No.	Chief Justice	Term of office	Appointer	Remarks
1	John Walter Hulme	1844–1860	Sir John Francis Davis	First Chief Justice of Hong Kong in 1844. Practising barrister in England. Retired on a Pension.
2	William Henry Adams	1860–1865	Sir Hercules Robinson	Appointed Attorney General of Hong Kong in 1859. Immediately acted as Chief Justice due to Hulme being on sick leave in 1859. Appointed to substantive position on Hulme's retirement. Died in office.
3	Sir John Jackson Smale	1866–1881	Sir Richard Graves MacDonnell	Attorney General of Hong Kong from 1861 to 1866. Retired on a pension.
4	Sir George Phillippo	1882–1888	Malcolm Struan Tonnochy	Attorney General of Hong Kong from 1876 to 79. Chief Justice of Gibraltar from 1879 to 1882. Retired on a pension.
5	Sir James Russell	1888–1892	Sir William Des Voeux	Puisne Judge of Supreme Court of Hong Kong from 1883 to 1888. Retired due to ill health.
6	Sir Fielding Clarke	1892–1896	Sir William Robinson	Chief Judicial Commissioner, Western Pacific (1882 to 1883 and 1884), ()Chief Justice of Fiji (1881-1885) prior to appointment. Became Chief Justice of Jamaica 1896-1911.
7	Sir John Worrell Carrington	1896–1901	Sir William Robinson	Solicitor General of Barbados and acted as Attorney General (1878-1881), Chief Justice of St. Lucia and Tobago (1882-1889), Administered the Government of Tobago (1883-1885), Acting Chief Justice of Grenada (1886), Attorney General British Guiana (1889-1896). Retired from Hong Kong on a pension.
8	Sir William Meigh Goodman	1902–1905	Sir Henry Arthur Blake	Attorney General of Hong Kong from 1889 to 1902. Former solicitor General of Barbados in 1878 to 1882, Chief Justice of St Lucia and Tobago 1882 to 1889 and Administrator of Tobago from 1883 to 1885. Retired due to ill health.
9	Sir Francis Piggott	1905–1912	Sir Matthew Nathan	Procureur-General of Mauritius 1893-1904 prior to appointment. Compulsorily retired. Commenced practice as junior counsel at bar in Hong Kong 1912-1914.
10	Sir William Rees-Davies	1912–1924	Claud Severn	Attorney General of Hong Kong from 1907 to 1912. Retired on a pension.
11	Sir Henry Gollan	1924–1930	Sir Reginald Edward Stubbs	Chief Justice of Bermuda (1904-1911), Attorney General of Ceylon (1918-1924) prior to appointment. Member of the Full Court of the British Supreme Court for China in Shanghai 1926-1930. Retired on a pension in 1930.
12	Sir Joseph H. Kemp	1930–1933	Thomas Southorn	Puisne Judge Supreme Court of Hong Kong from 1913 to 1915. Attorney General of Hong Kong from 1915 to 1930. Retired on a pension.
13	Sir Atholl MacGregor	1934–1945	Sir William Peel	Attorney General of Trinidad (1926-1929) and Kenya (1929-1933) prior to appointment. Interned in Stanley Internment Camp, WWII. Died immediately after war en route to England.
14	Sir Henry Blackall	1946–1948	Sir Mark Young	Chief Justice of Trinidad and Tobago (1943-1946) prior to appointment. Later was appointed President of the West African Court of Appeals (1948-1951).
15	Sir Leslie Gibson	1948–1951	Sir Alexander Grantham	Attorney General of Trinidad (1940-1944), Attorney General of Palestine (1944-1948) prior to appointment. Later served as legal adviser to the Foreign Office.
16	Sir Gerard Howe	1951–1955	Sir Alexander Grantham	Solicitor General in Nigeria (1941-1946), Attorney General of Nigeria (1946-1950) prior to appointment. Died in office.
17	Sir Michael Hogan	1955–1970	Sir Alexander Grantham	Attorney General in Aden (1944-1945), Attorney General of Malaya (1950-1955) prior to appointment. Picture shows Hogan at opening of 1967 Assizes.
18	Sir Ivo Rigby	1970–1973	Sir David C.C. Trench	Senior Puisne Judge, Hong Kong, 1961-1970. Picture shows Rigby heading parade at opening of 1970 Assizes
19	Sir Geoffrey Briggs	1973–1978	Sir Murray MacLehose	Puisne Judge, Hong Kong 1965-1973.
20	Sir Denys Roberts	1979–1988	Sir Murray MacLehose	Attorney General of Hong Kong from 1966 to 1973. Colonial/Chief Secretary from 1973 to 1979.
21	Sir Ti-liang Yang	1988–1996	Sir David Wilson	First Chinese Chief Justice. Resigned to contest position of Chief Executive of Hong Kong.
–	Sir Noel Power	1996–1997; Acting	Chris Patten	Acting CJ pending handover of Hong Kong to China 1997. Vice President of the Court of Appeal of the Supreme Court of Hong Kong. Later Vice-President of the Court of Appeal of the High Court (1997-1999), Justice of the Court of Appeal of Brunei Darussalam (2003-2007) and as President (2007-2009).

== See also ==
- Chief Justice of the Court of Final Appeal
- High Court of Hong Kong
- Supreme Court of Hong Kong
- Attorney General of Hong Kong
