= John Peter De Gex =

Sir John Peter De Gex (1809–1887) was an English barrister and law reporter.

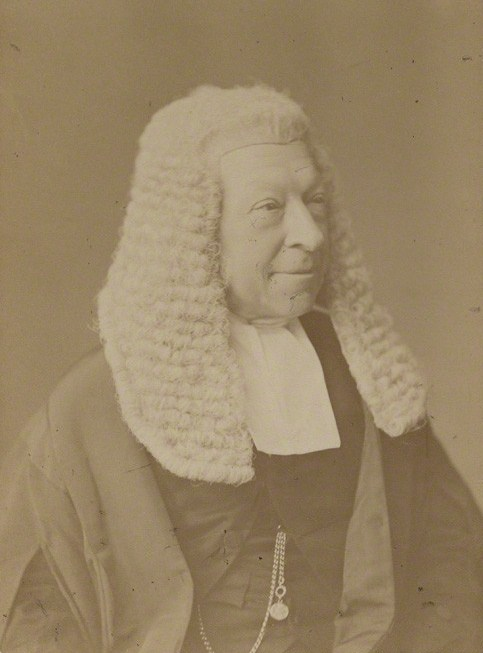

== Life ==
The eldest son of John de Gex of Leicester Place, Middlesex, his family background was Swiss, his father having settled in England about the beginning of the century. He graduated B.A. at Jesus College, Cambridge, in 1831, and proceeded M.A. in 1834. Having entered Lincoln's Inn on 4 November 1831, he was called to the bar there on 30 January 1835. His name first appears in the Law List in 1837. For many years he had next to no practice, and concentrated on law reporting.

In 1871 De Gex became a director of the Legal and General Insurance Office, of which in 1867 he had been appointed auditor. He built up an extensive practice in bankruptcy. A case in 1869, in which he played a leading part, was that of the Duke of Newcastle (L. R. 5 Ch. App. 172). The question was whether the Duke of Newcastle, not being engaged in trade, was exempt from the operation of the law of bankruptcy on the ground of his being a peer. The bankruptcy court held that he was exempt. The case was argued before the Court of Appeal, De Gex being leading counsel for the appellant, and Sir Roundell Palmer representing the duke. Lord Justice Giffard decided in favour of the appeal.

De Gex took silk on 28 March 1865, with Joshua Williams and George Jessel; and then on 19 April he was elected a bencher of his inn. In 1882 he was elected treasurer of Lincoln's Inn, and in December of the same year he was knighted on occasion of the opening of the new law courts. He had then recently retired from practice. He died on 14 May 1887 at his residence, 20 Hyde Park Square, London. He was buried on 19 May at Kensal Green cemetery.

== Works ==
De Gex collaborated on law reports first with Basil Montagu and Edward Deacon: "Montagu, Deacon, and De Gex" consisted of three volumes of Cases in Bankruptcy argued and determined in the Court of Review, and on Appeal before the Lord Chancellor, London, 1842–5. In 1852 he published a volume of Cases in Bankruptcy decided by the Court of Review, Vice-chancellor Knight-Bruce, and the Lord-chancellors Lyndhurst and Cottenham. At the same time he was reporting cases in chancery, with John Jackson Smale, and there resulted Reports of Cases decided in the High Court of Chancery, by Knight-Bruce, V.C., and Parker, V.C., 1849–1853, 5 vols. London.

De Gex was associated with Steuart Macnaghten, who had previously been co-author of "Macnaghten and Gordon's Reports" in the authorship of the reports of Cases in the Court of Appeal in Chancery, known as "De Gex, Macnaghten, and Gordon's Reports", 1851–7, 8 vols. London. The series continued after Macnaghten ceased to report in collaboration, first with Henry Cadman Jones ("De Gex and Jones's Reports", 1857–9, 2 vols. London), then with both Jones and F. Fisher ("De Gex, Fisher, and Jones's Reports", 1859–62, 4 vols. London), and finally with Cadman Jones and Richard Horton Smith ("De Gex, Jones, and Smith's Reports", 1863–5, 4 vols. London).

In 1867 De Gex published, in conjunction with Horton Smith, Arrangements between Debtors and Creditors under the Bankruptcy Act, 1861, London. The work consisted of a collection of precedents of deeds of arrangement, with an introduction and notes, and a digest of cases. A supplement appeared in 1868, and another in 1869.

== Family ==
De Gex married in 1880 Alice Emma, eldest daughter of Sir John Henry Briggs.

== Notes ==
Attribution

This article incorporates text from a publication now in the public domain: Stephen, Leslie, ed. (1888). "De Gex, John Peter". Dictionary of National Biography. Vol. 14. London: Smith, Elder & Co.
