= Arthur Ridehalgh =

Attorney General of Hong Kong

Arthur Ridehalgh, Attorney General of Hong Kong

Arthur Ridehalgh QC (1907–1971) served as a government lawyer in a number of British colonies in the mid 20th Century. His last position was as Attorney General of Hong Kong.

== Early life ==
Ridehalgh was born on 10 April 1907. He was the 4th son of James and Amelia Ridehalgh of Oakland, Barrowford, Lancashire in England.

He was educated at Terra Nova Preparatory School, Birkdale School and Sedbergh School. He then attended Wadham College, Oxford where he obtained a Bachelor of Arts.

He was called to the bar of Gray's Inn in 1929 and joined the Northern Circuit and practised in Manchester.

== Legal appointments ==
In 1935, he was appointed Crown Attorney and Magistrate, St Kitts, Leeward Islands. In 1939, he was appointed Crown Counsel in the Gold Coast (present day Ghana).

In 1946, he was appointed Solicitor General in Nigeria. He acted from time to time as Attorney General while in Nigeria. He was made a King's Counsel in 1949.

In 1952, he was appointed Attorney General of Hong Kong succeeding John Bowes Griffin who had been appointed Chief Justice of Uganda. He served in Hong Kong until his retirement from British government service in 1962. He was made a QC in Hong Kong in 1953.

In Hong Kong, he was described as "an extremely considerate and thoughtful chief and a very sound and hardworking lawyer with the excellent habit of taking his subordinates out in turn to lunch."

== Retirement and death ==
Ridehalgh retired in 1961 and was succeeded by Maurice Heenan. He returned to Llanfair Talhaiarn, Abergele, Denbighshire in North Wales. He died on 7 September 1971 at the age of 64.

Legal offices
Preceded by John Bowes Griffin	Attorney General of Hong Kong; 1952 – 1962	Succeeded by Maurice Heenan
