= Guy Wilson (horticulturalist) =

Guy Livingstone Wilson (1885–1962) was an Irish plantsman known as one of the most successful breeders of daffodils. He is commemorated by the Guy L. Wilson Daffodil Garden at the University of Ulster's Coleraine campus.

== Life ==
Wilson was brought up in Broughshane, County Antrim. His family ran a drapers and tweed mill at Ballymena. He became interested in gardening, and more specifically in daffodils, at a young age, after being shown a book on the subject written by William Baylor Hartland. After completing his education he worked in the family business for a time before becoming a professional horticulturalist.

He began selectively breeding his own daffodil varieties in his early twenties, with a particular interest in the white forms often associated with Ireland. He received his first Royal Horticultural Society Award of Merit in 1922, for a variety called "White Dame". After spending some time at Coey's nursery in Larne he set up his own business, and eventually opened a large nursery at Marden, Kent though he remained based in County Antrim. Wilson had a good reputation for his ability to assess a flower's characteristics, and went on to produce a large number of cultivars.

In 1950 the Royal Horticultural Society presented Wilson with its highest award, the Victoria Medal.

Wilson, who never married, died in February 1962.

== Memorial garden ==
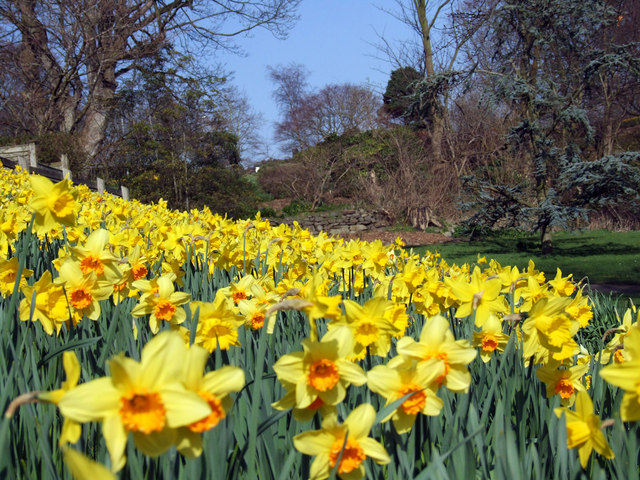
Daffodil gardens established at Coleraine, including many of Wilson's cultivars.

The Guy L. Wilson Daffodil Garden was begun in 1971 at Coleraine. Established on 2 hectares of land around the former Fortview Quarry, and sloping down to the River Bann, it contains over 1000 Narcissus cultivars, along with many specimen trees.
