= John Walter Hulme =

Chief Justice of Hong Kong from 1844 to 1859

John Walter Hulme (1805-1861) was a British lawyer and Judge. He was the first Chief Justice of Hong Kong, taking office in 1844.

== Early life ==
Hulme was born in 1805 in Fenton, Staffordshire, England. He was the son of a "highly respectable solicitor."

He was called to the Bar of the Middle Temple in 1829. He served his pupillage with the noted barrister and author Joseph Chitty. He was a co-author with Chitty of A Practical Treatise on Bills of Exchange and A Collection of Statutes of Practical Utility. He also married Chitty's daughter, Eliza.

== Legal appointment ==
Hong Kong was ceded to the United Kingdom in 1842 under the Treaty of Nanking. Initially, a military government was formed. In 1844, civilian government was put in place under Governor John Francis Davis.

Hulme was appointed the first Chief Justice of Hong Kong. The Colonial Office had great difficulty in finding a judge willing to go to the newly established colony. Hulme was offered the very high salary of £3,000 per annum to go to Hong Kong; in return, he agreed to give up his right to a pension.

He arrived in Hong Kong on 7 May 1844 on board the H.M.S. Spitfire together with Davis and other officials. He was also appointed as a member of the Hong Kong Legislative Council. The Supreme Court was formally opened on 1 October 1844 with Hulme on the bench.

As Chief Justice, Hulme fearlessly protected the independence of the judiciary. He had a number of run-ins with Governor Davis that culminated in charges of drunkenness being brought against him. The charge against him read that he had been "in a state of intoxication as to attract public attention when attending a public entertainment given by Rear Admiral Thomas Cockrane on November 22, 1845". In 1847, he was brought before the Executive Council of Hong Kong, who found him guilty and suspended him from his position. On 30 December 1847, Hulme returned to England; the Colonial Secretary refused to uphold the verdict and he soon returned to Hong Kong.

In November 1846, Hulme refused to uphold a guilty verdict against a Mr Compton that had been handed down by the British consular court in Canton. Compton, an English merchant, was fined HK$200 for causing a riot by kicking over a Chinese stall and beating its owner with his stick, and appealed to the Supreme Court of Hong Kong. Hulme was highly critical of the way in which the case had been handled. Sir John Davis, the Governor of Hong Kong wrote to Lord Palmerston, the Prime Minister, stating: "Some fresh ordinance will inevitably be required to prevent such mischievous interference in international cases."

In February 1857, Hulme presided at the trial of ten Chinese men who had been charged in connection to a mass poisoning of Europeans in Hong Kong known as the Esing Bakery incident. The Attorney General, Thomas Chisholm Anstey, argued that the principal suspect, Cheong Ah-lum, should be hanged regardless of his innocence because it was "better to hang the wrong man than confess that British sagacity and activity have failed to discover the real criminals". Hulme replied that "hanging the wrong man will not further the ends of justice", and later accepted the jury's acquittal of Cheong.

Hulme became very unwell to the end of his term of office and often would only commence court sitting at noon or 1pm. He was put under pressure to retire, but insisted that he be given a pension. He left Hong Kong on leave in early 1859 and in England was offered a handsome pension of £1,500 per annum which he accepted.

== Death ==
Hulme died soon after his retirement, on 1 March 1861 in Brighton.

Legal offices
New office	Chief Justice of Hong Kong; 1844–1860	Succeeded by William Henry Adams
