= Denys Roberts =

British judge and colonial administrator (1923–2013)

The Honourable Dato Seri Paduka Sir Denys Roberts KBE SPMB QC

20th Chief Justice of Hong Kong
- In office 1979–1988
- Preceded by: Geoffrey Briggs
- Succeeded by: Ti-liang Yang

25th Chief Secretary of Hong Kong (Colonial Secretary 1973–76)
- In office 30 September 1973 – 2 October 1978
- Monarch: Elizabeth II
- Governor: Murray MacLehose
- Preceded by: Hugh Norman-Walker
- Succeeded by: Jack Cater

18th Attorney General of Hong Kong
- In office 3 September 1966 – 29 September 1973
- Preceded by: Maurice Heenan
- Succeeded by: John William Dixon Hobley

2nd Chief Justice of Brunei
- In office 1979–2001
- Nominated by: Hassanal Bolkiah
- Preceded by: Geoffrey Briggs
- Succeeded by: Mohammed Saied

Personal details
- Born: 19 January 1923 London, United Kingdom
- Died: 20 May 2013 (aged 90) Norfolk, United Kingdom
- Spouses: Brenda Marsh (m. 1949; div. 1973) Anna Fiona Dollar Alexander (m. 1985)
- Children: 3
- Education: Wadham College, Oxford (MA; BCL)

Military service
- Allegiance: United Kingdom
- Branch/service: British Army
- Years of service: 1943–1946
- Rank: Captain
- Unit: Royal Artillery
- Battles/wars: World War II

Sir Denys Tudor Emil Roberts KBE SPMB QC (Traditional Chinese: 羅弼時爵士; 19 January 1923 – 20 May 2013) was a British colonial official and judge. Joining the colonial civil service as a Crown Counsel in Nyasaland (now Malawi) in 1953, he became Attorney General of Gibraltar in 1960. In 1962, he was posted to Hong Kong as Solicitor-General, and was successively promoted to Attorney-General in 1966, Colonial Secretary/Chief Secretary in 1973 and Chief Justice in 1979. He was the first and only Attorney-General to become both Colonial Secretary (and Chief Secretary) in Hong Kong. Never having been a judge before, he was appointed as Chief Justice of the Supreme Court in 1979 and was the first and only Colonial Secretary (and Chief Secretary) of Hong Kong to receive such appointment.

Roberts was the last non-Chinese person to hold the post of Chief Justice of Hong Kong. After retiring in 1988, he had served as President of the Court of Appeal of Bermuda, Chief Justice and President of Court of Appeal of Brunei Darussalam before finally retiring from the judicial service in 2003.

== Early life and education ==
Roberts was born on 19 January 1923 in London, England, to William David Roberts, a barrister-at-law, and Dorothy Elizabeth Roberts. He was educated in Aldenham School in his childhood, and later studied law in Wadham College, Oxford in 1942. His education was interrupted when he was commissioned as a second lieutenant in the Royal Artillery on 2 November 1943. During the Second World War, he served in France, Belgium, the Netherlands and Germany, and achieved the rank of captain. He was posted to India when the war ended in 1945.

After the war, Roberts retired from the army in 1946 and resumed his interrupted education in Oxford. He obtained his Master of Arts degree in 1948, Bachelor of Civil Law degree in 1949, and was made an honorary fellow of Wadham College in 1984. He played cricket for Hertfordshire in the 1948 Minor Counties Championship, playing a single match against Bedfordshire.

== Colonial career ==
Roberts was called to the bar by Lincoln's Inn. In 1950, he began his career as a barrister-at-law based in London, but it was discontinued when he joined the colonial civil service in 1953 as a Crown Counsel in Nyasaland (now Malawi). In 1960, he was promoted to Attorney-General of Gibraltar and became an ex officio member of both Executive and Legislative Councils of Gibraltar. In the same year, he was appointed an Officer of the Order of the British Empire in the New Year Honours, and made a Queen's Counsel of Gibraltar on 20 June.

Roberts served for only two years, which was much shorter than his predecessors, and was posted out of Gibraltar in 1962. According to his memoir, he reckoned that the reason was probably because he offended the Governor in a military parade where he shouted openly at the Governor's aide-de-camp for the poor arrangement of the event.

In 1962, Roberts was sent to Hong Kong as Solicitor General and was made a Queen's Counsel of Hong Kong on 8 September 1964. He was appointed Attorney-General by then Governor Sir David Trench in 1966 and became ex officio member of both Executive and Legislative Councils of Hong Kong, promoted Commander of the Order of the British Empire in the 1970 New Year Honours, and was appointed Colonial Secretary, succeeding Sir Hugh Norman-Walker, by Governor Sir Murray MacLehose in 1973. Roberts was the first and only Attorney-General to become Colonial Secretary in the history of Hong Kong. He continued to hold the position when Colonial Secretary was renamed Chief Secretary in 1976.

During his tenure as Colonial Secretary and Chief Secretary, Roberts assisted MacLehose to implement a wide range of policies from political reform to housing development. He paid particular attention to trade development and visited a number of places, including the United States and Latin America, to promote trade relations. In the 1975 Queen's Birthday Honours, Roberts was promoted Knight Commander of the Order of the British Empire for his public services. In 1979, he chaired an investigation to look into the aftermath of the fraud scandal of Golden Jubilee Secondary School. Roberts was acting Governor for a number of occasions when the Governor was absent.

In 1979, Roberts was appointed Chief Justice of Hong Kong. His appointment aroused a brief sensation as he had never been a judge and was the first and only Chief Secretary to become Chief Justice in Hong Kong. His background as an experienced former colonial Attorney-General was the government's justification for his suitability.

Besides becoming Chief Justice of Hong Kong, Roberts was appointed honorary bencher of Lincoln's Inn in 1978. From 1979 to 2001, he also served as Chief Justice of Brunei Darussalam and was made a Dato by the royal house of Brunei Darussalam in 1984. In his capacity as Chief Justice of Hong Kong, Roberts paid visits to mainland China twice. He was the first Chief Justice to visit People's Republic of China when he visited Canton, Shanghai and Beijing in 1983 under an individual invitation by the Chinese Government. In 1985, he visited China again along with other Hong Kong judges and toured Beijing and Xi'an. Roberts witnessed the opening of the new Supreme Court Building (now High Court Building) at 38 Queensway in 1984.

Excluding Sir Noel Power, who was acting Chief Justice from 1996 to 1997, Roberts was the last non-Chinese to hold the post of Chief Justice of Hong Kong. When he retired in 1988, his successor, Sir Ti-liang Yang, became the first Chinese Chief Justice in the colonial history of Hong Kong. Customarily, the Chief Justice of Hong Kong would resign the post of Chief Justice of Brunei Darussalam when he retired. This practice was, however, formally ended in 1993 and Sir Ti-liang Yang was appointed President of the Court of Appeal of Brunei in 1988, instead of Chief Justice of Brunei. Accordingly, Roberts continued to serve as Chief Justice of Brunei Darussalam after his retirement and became President of the Court of Appeal of Bermuda from 1988 to 1994. After standing down as Chief Justice of Brunei Darussalam in 2001, he became President of the Court of Appeal of Brunei Darussalam until. From 1997 to 2003, he was one of the non-permanent Hong Kong judges of the Hong Kong Court of Final Appeal.

== Family ==
Roberts was married to Brenda Marsh in 1949. The couple had one son and one daughter. The marriage ended in divorce in 1973. In 1985, he married Anna Fiona Dollar Alexander, with whom he had a son.

Roberts was a keen cricketer. He took part in the Minor Counties Championship representing Hertfordshire in 1948. He was president of Marylebone Cricket Club (MCC) from 1989 to 1990. He was also a member of the Royal Commonwealth Society and wrote a number of books and stories on law and colonial life. He published his memoir, Another Disaster, in 2006, in which he recounted his life in the colonies.

== Later years ==
Roberts lived in retirement in Norfolk, England, where he spent his time writing.

He died, aged 90, on 20 May 2013. A memorial service was held for him at the Lincoln's Inn Chapel on 12 November that year. David Wilson, the Governor of Hong Kong when Roberts was Chief Justice, delivered an address.

== Honours ==
- Officer of the Order of the British Empire (1960)
- Queen's Counsel (Gibraltar, 1960)
- Queen's Counsel (Hong Kong, 1964)
- Commander of the Order of the British Empire (1970)
- Knight Commander of the Order of the British Empire (1975)
- Order of Seri Paduka Mahkota Brunei, First Class (Brunei Darussalam, 1984)
- Official Justice of the Peace (Hong Kong)

=== Honorary Fellowship ===
- Wadham College, Oxford (1984)

== Legacy ==
The Sir Denys Roberts Squash Courts (羅弼時爵士壁球場), located at Yuen Long, New Territories, Hong Kong, were named in his honour.

== Bibliography ==
- Smuggler's Circuit, 1954 (filmed as Law and Disorder, 1958)
- Beds and Roses, 1956.
- The Elwood Wager, 1958.
- The Bones of the Wajingas, 1960.
- How to Dispense with Lawyers, 1964.
- Doing them Justice, 1986.
- I'll Do Better Next Time, 1995.
- Yes Sir But, 2000.
- Another Disaster, 2006.

== See also ==
- Politics of Gibraltar
- Attorney-General
- Colonial Secretary
- Chief Justice of the Supreme Court of Hong Kong

Government offices
Preceded by Sir Hugh Norman-Walker	Colonial Secretary of Hong Kong; 1973–1976	Succeeded by Himself as Chief Secretary of Hong Kong
Preceded by Himself as Colonial Secretary of Hong Kong	Chief Secretary of Hong Kong; 1976–1979	Succeeded by Sir Jack Cater
Legal offices
Preceded by Maurice Heenan	Attorney General of Hong Kong; 1966–1973	Succeeded by John William Dixon Hobley
Preceded by Sir Geoffrey Briggs	Chief Justice of Hong Kong; 1979–1988	Succeeded by Yang Ti-liang
Preceded by Sir Geoffrey Briggs	Chief Justice of Brunei; 1979–2001	Succeeded by Mohammed Saied
