= Leslie Gibson (judge) =

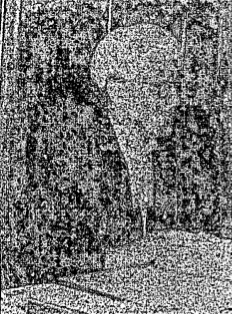
Sir Leslie Gibson, Chief Justice of Hong Kong

Sir Leslie Bertram Gibson QC (14 May 1896 – 21 September 1952) was a British lawyer and judge. He was Chief Justice of Hong Kong in the late 1940s.

== Early life ==
Gibson was the son of George F Gibson of Coventry. He was educated at King Henry VIII School, Coventry. He obtained an LLB from the University of London.

== Service in Malaya ==
Gibson joined the Malayan Civil Service in 1920 and served in Malaya until 1937. He was at one time official assignee at Penang. He also served as Crown Counsel and Assistant Legal Adviser, Malaya. While working in Malaya, he studied for the bar and was called to the Bar of Gray's Inn in 1930.

== Legal career ==
In 1937, Gibson joined the Colonial Legal Service and in 1940 was appointed Attorney General of Trinidad. He was made a King's Counsel in Trinidad in 1942.

He served in that position until 1944 when he was appointed Attorney General of Palestine.

In 1948, he was appointed Chief Justice of Hong Kong upon the transfer of Henry Blackall to Africa. Gibson was knighted in the same year.

In 1950, he returned to England, where he was appointed legal adviser to the Foreign Office Administration of African Territories. In 1951, he was appointed assistant legal adviser, Colonial Office and Commonwealth Relations Office.

== Death ==
Gibson died on 21 September 1952 in Godalming, Surrey.

Legal offices
Preceded by Sir Henry Blackall	Chief Justice of Hong Kong; 1948-1951	Succeeded by Sir Gerard Lewis Howe
