= Atholl MacGregor =

Sir Alasdair Duncan Atholl MacGregor KB KC
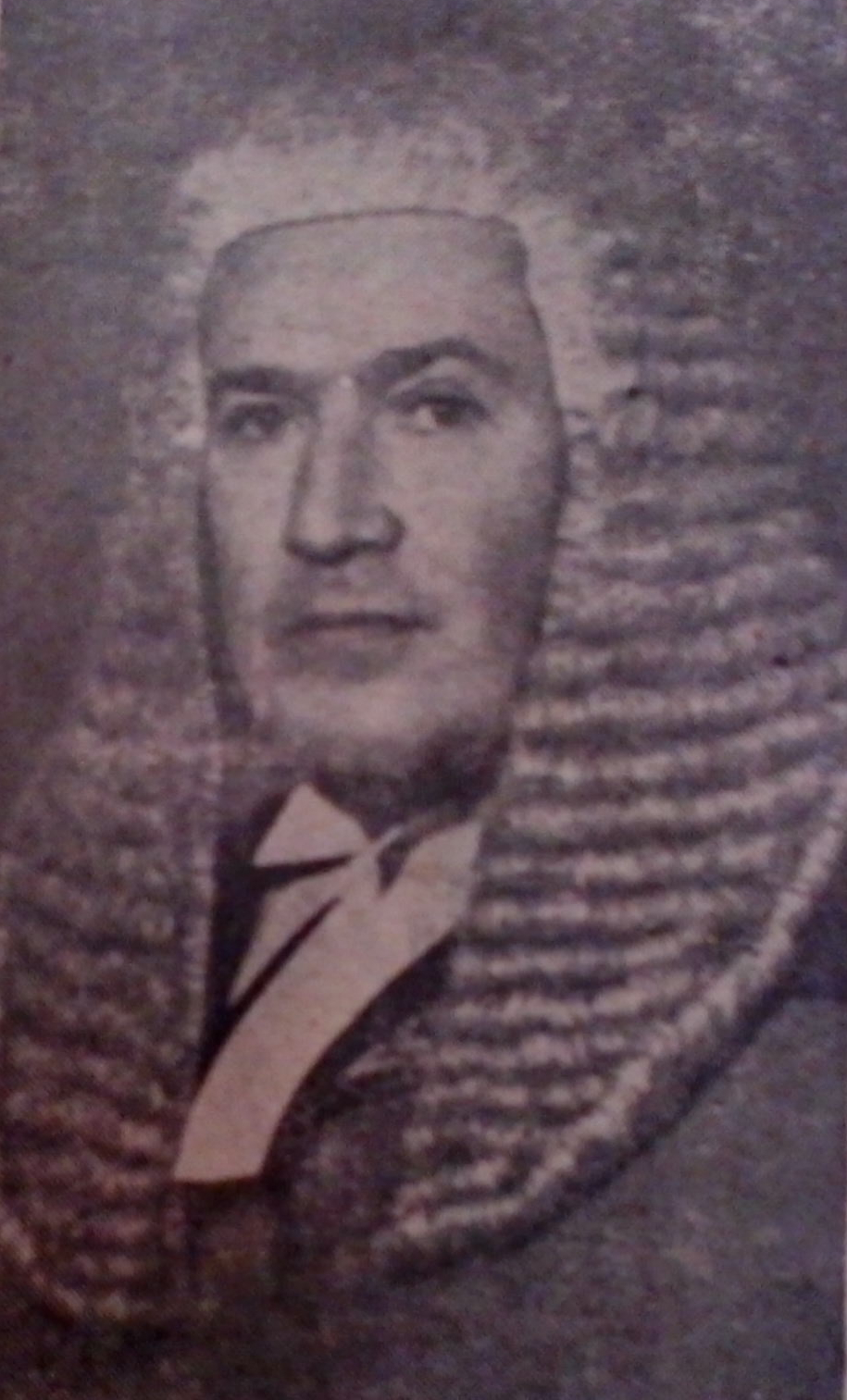
- Sir Atholl MacGregor, Chief Justice of Hong Kong

Chief Justice of Hong Kong
- In office 1934–1945
- Preceded by: Sir Joseph Horsford Kemp
- Succeeded by: Sir Henry Blackall

Attorney-General of Trinidad and Tobago
- In office 1926–1929

Attorney-General of Kenya
- In office 1929–1933

Personal details
- Born: 4 June 1883
- Died: 30 October 1945 (aged 62) At sea
- Spouse: Gertrude Mary Tasker
- Education: University of Edinburgh (MA); Lincoln College, Oxford (BA)
- Occupation: Lawyer, judge
- Awards: Knights Bachelor; King's Counsel

Sir Alasdair Duncan Atholl MacGregor KC (4 June 1883 – 30 October 1945) was a British lawyer and judge. He served as Attorney General in a number of British colonies in the early 20th century. He was Chief Justice of Hong Kong from 1933 to 1945.

== MacGregor's given names ==
MacGregor generally used the Christian name Atholl. In some sources it is spelt Athol. However, official announcements, such as his appointments and honours published in the London Gazette, refer to him, as would be expected, by his full name of Alasdair Duncan Atholl MacGregor.

== Early life ==
MacGregor was born in 1883, the son of Henrietta Forrester and her husband, Robert Roy MacGregor. His father worked for the Exchequer. The family lived at 55 Grange Loan in south Edinburgh.

Atholl attended the University of Edinburgh, where he graduated with an MA, followed by Lincoln College, Oxford, where he obtained a BA. He was called to the bar of Lincoln's Inn in 1909.

He married, in 1919, Gertrude Mary, the youngest daughter of Mr R. Brandon Tasker of Marino, Caernarfon in North Wales. They had no children.

== Appointments ==
MacGregor served as assistant district commissioner of Southern Nigeria from 1912 to 1914. In 1914 he was appointed a police magistrate at Lagos and served in that position for 8 years. In 1922, he was appointed Crown counsel and solicitor-general of Nigeria and served in that position until 1926. He was transferred to Trinidad in 1926 and then to Kenya in 1929. In both places, he served as the attorney-general. He was made a King's Counsel in 1927 while serving in Trinidad.

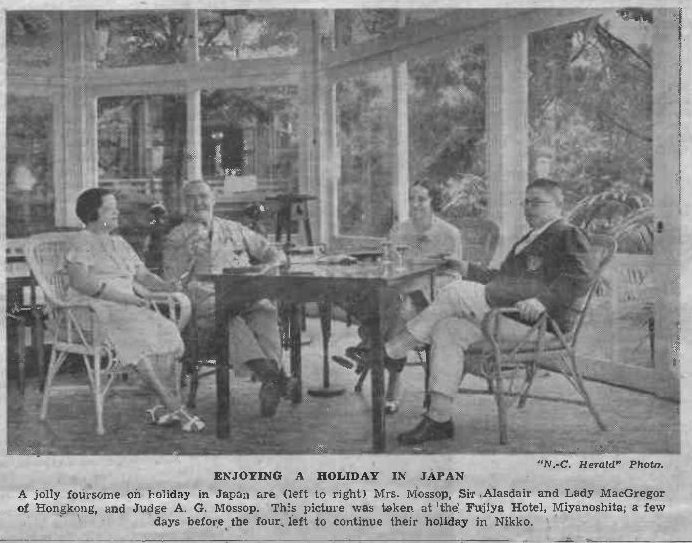
MacGregor and Allan Mossop, Judge of the British Supreme Court for China, at the Fujiya Hotel, Japan 1935

In 1933 MacGregor was appointed Chief Justice of Hong Kong in succession to Joseph Horsford Kemp. As Chief Justice he was reported to "have won golden opinions on the bench where he has displayed abilities of a high order, whilst socially also he has shown himself to be a man of marked charm of personality." In his capacity as Chief Justice of Hong Kong, he also sat as a member of the full court of the British Supreme Court for China in Shanghai.

MacGregor was knighted in 1935. In 1937, he was appointed chairman of a committee to study restoration of allowances to Malayan civil servants. He was made a Commander of the Grand Priory in the British Realm of the Venerable Order of the Hospital of St John of Jerusalem in 1940.

== Internment by Japanese during World War II ==
MacGregor was interned by the Japanese in Stanley Internment Camp from 1941 to 1945. During the time he continued to act as Chief Justice for the internees, including granting a number of divorces.

MacGregor survived the war, but contracted beriberi in the camp. His last official act as Chief Justice was to swear in Franklin Charles Gimson as acting Governor of Hong Kong following the Japanese surrender.

== Death ==
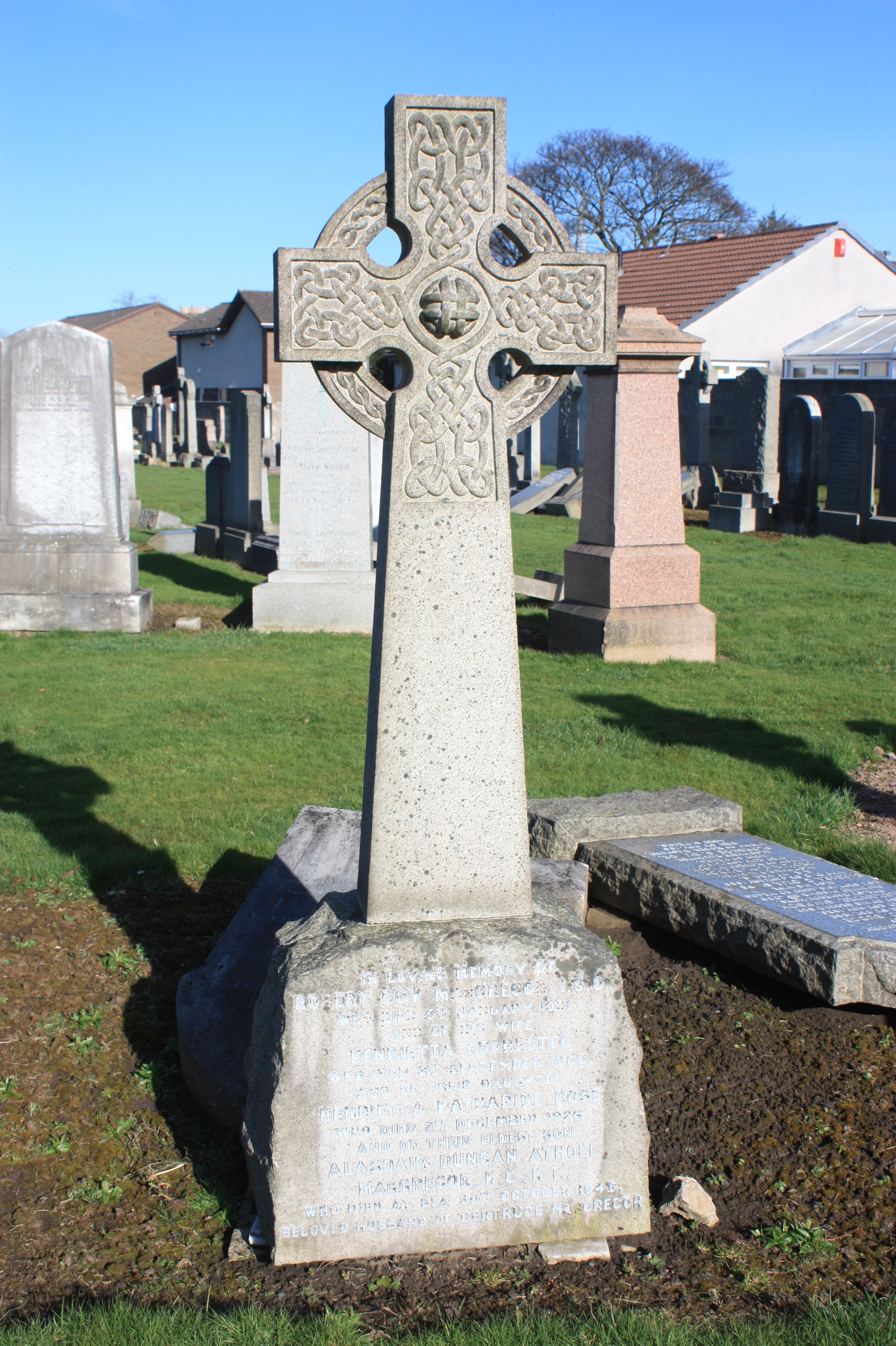
Memorial to Sir Atholl MacGregor, Morningside Cemetery, Edinburgh

MacGregor was carried on to the first hospital ship, the Highland Monarch, leaving Hong Kong for England. He died on 30 October 1945 before reaching the Suez and was buried at sea.

He is memorialised on his parents' grave in Morningside Cemetery, Edinburgh.

Legal offices
Preceded by Sir Joseph Horsford Kemp	Chief Justice of Hong Kong; 1934–1945	Succeeded by Sir Henry Blackall
