= George Phillippo =

British Colonial Civil Servant

Sir George Phillippo
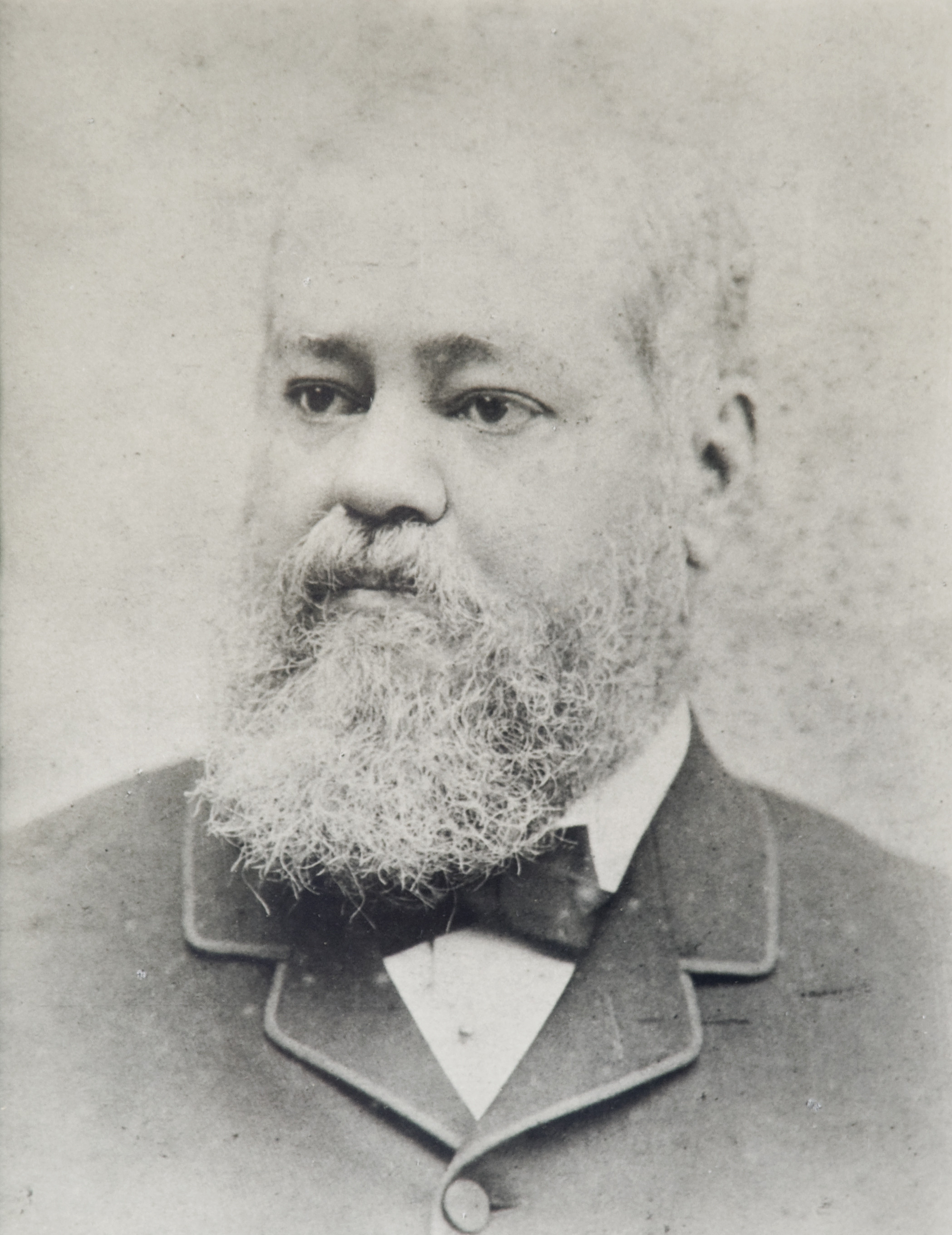

Chief Justice of Hong Kong
- In office 1882–1888

Personal details
- Born: 1833 Jamaica
- Died: 16 February 1914 (aged 80–81) Geneva, Switzerland
- Spouse: Eliza Hughes
- Education: Inner Temple

Sir George Phillippo (1833 – 16 February 1914) was Chief Justice of Hong Kong in the late 19th century. He often attended the Legislative Council of Hong Kong sittings from around 1884 to 1888.

== Early life and education ==
Phillippo was born in Spanish Town, St Catherine's, Jamaica in 1833, the son of Rev. James Phillippo and Hannah Elizabeth Cecil. He went to school in England, trained as a barrister and was called to the Bar in 1862. He did not practise law in England at that time, but returned to Jamaica, where he married Mary Clark, the daughter of Rev. John Clark, a colleague of his father in 1862. Mary's sister Hannah was married to George's brother James.

== Legal practice ==
In 1862 George was called to the Jamaican Bar and, although he did practise law in Jamaica, within a few years he began an illustrious career with the British government and took up appointments in many parts of the world. His wife Mary died 16 April 1890. Later in 1890 he married Eliza Hughes, daughter of Thomas Hughes while in London.

Some highlights of his career:

- Barrister-at-Law, Inner Temple, 1862
- Admitted to the Jamaica Bar, 1862
- Queen's Advocate, Sierra Leone 1868
- Commissioner then Attorney-General of British Columbia, 1870
- Member of the Legislative Council of the Colony of British Columbia, 1871
- Puisne Judge, British Guiana, 1872
- Puisne Judge of Straits Settlements, 1874–76
- Attorney General of Hong Kong, 1876–79
- Chief Justice of Gibraltar, 1879–82
- Knighted, 1882
- Chief Justice of Hong Kong, 1882–88
- Has Perak medal
- Retired from the Colonial Service, 5 October 1888
- Returned to private law practice, 1888–97
- Appointed Her Majesty's Consul at Geneva, 1897

== Retirement and death ==
He retired from Colonial Service as Chief Justice of Hong Kong on 5 October 1888. In 1897 he was appointed as the British High Consul in Geneva, Switzerland.

After he retired from public life in 1910 he decided to remain in Geneva and it was there he died on 16 February 1914. His funeral was conducted at the English Church in Geneva.

Legal offices
Preceded by John Bramston	Attorney General of Hong Kong; 1876–79	Succeeded by Edward Loughlin O'Malley
Preceded by William Henry Doyle	Chief Justice of Gibraltar; 1879–82	Succeeded by Henry James Burford Burford-Hancock
Preceded by John Jackson Smale	Chief Justice of Hong Kong; 1882–88	Succeeded by James Russell
