= Gerard Lewis Howe =

Chief Justice of Hong Kong (1899–1955)

Sir Gerard Howe
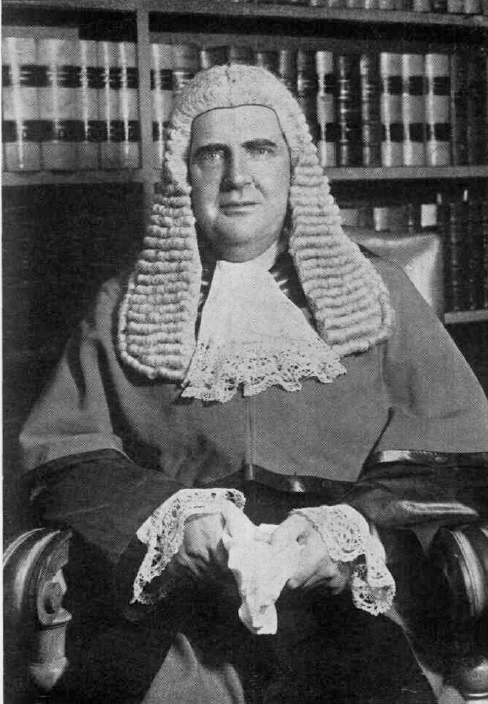

Chief Justice of the Supreme Court of Hong Kong
- In office 1950–1955
- Preceded by: Sir Leslie Gibson
- Succeeded by: Sir Michael Hogan

Personal details
- Education: The Royal School, Armagh; Trinity College, Dublin

Sir Gerard Lewis Howe, QC (3 June 1899 – 25 May 1955) was a British lawyer and judge. He was Chief Justice of Hong Kong in the early 1950s.

== Early life ==
Howe was born on 3 June 1899. He was the son of Gerard Augustus Howe of Dublin and Nina, daughter of Henry Beasley, Monkstown, Dublin. He was educated at The Royal School, Armagh and Trinity College, Dublin. He served in the military during World War I and was mentioned in despatches. He qualified as a barrister at law at King's Inns in 1923. He married Margaret, daughter of Francis Maguire JP in 1927.

== Legal appointments ==
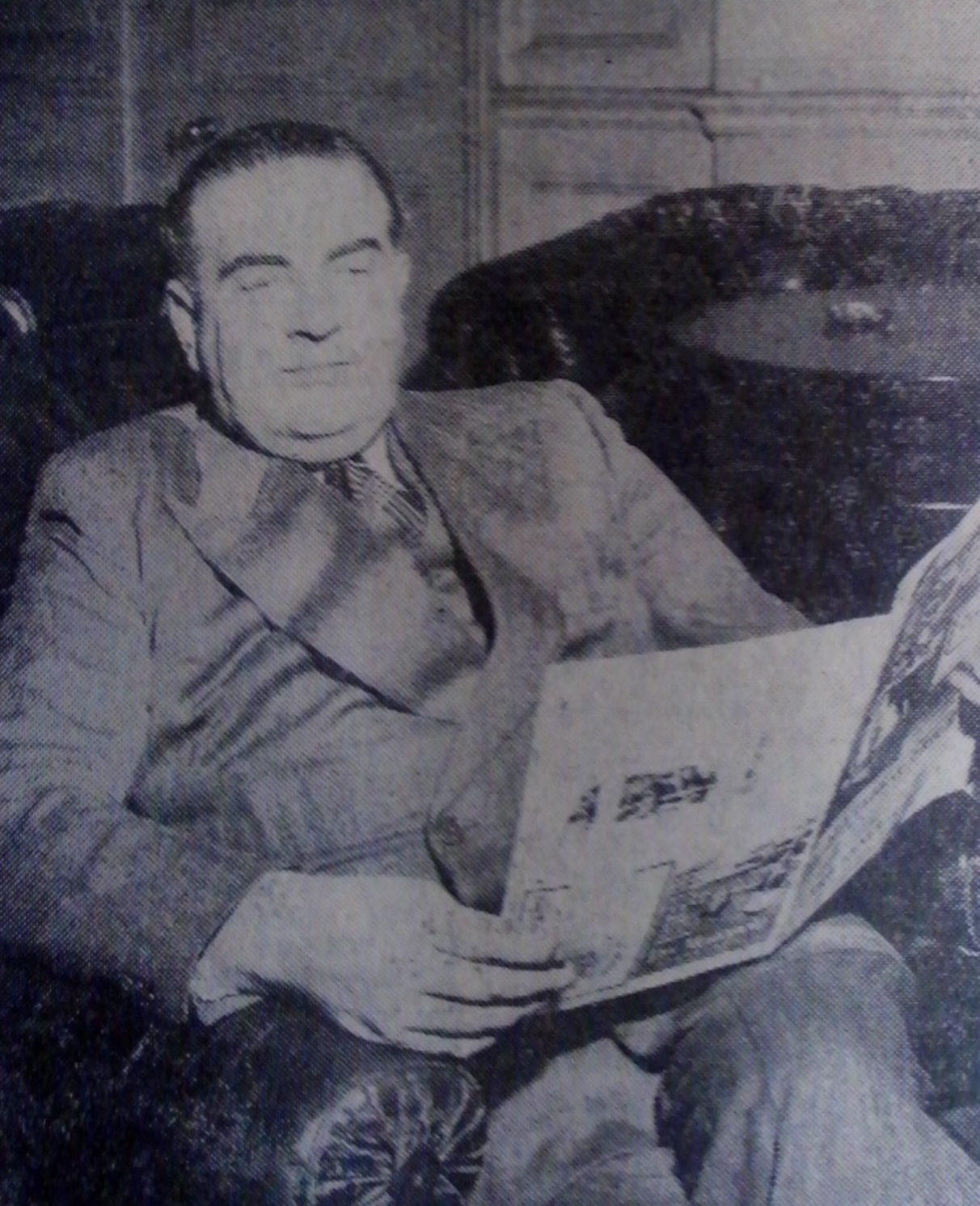
Sir Gerard Howe on his appointment to HK

Howe joined the Colonial Legal Service and was appointed resident magistrate in Kenya in 1930. He then served as Crown counsel in the Gold Coast (1934–1937) and Straits Settlements (1937–1941).

He was appointed Solicitor General in Nigeria in 1941 and then promoted to Attorney General in 1946. He was appointed a King's Counsel in 1946. He was knighted in 1949 whilst attorney general of Nigeria.

In 1950, he was appointed Chief Justice of Hong Kong replacing Sir Leslie Bertram Gibson.

== Death ==
Howe fell ill in the summer of 1953 and in April 1954 returned to his home in Bullough Castle, Dublin.

Howe died while still in office on 25 May 1955 in London.

On his death, the full court convened on 28 May 1955 to pay tribute to him. A two-minute silence was also observed by Chief Magistrate Lo Hin Shing.

Legal offices
Preceded by Sir Leslie B Gibson	Chief Justice of Hong Kong; 1951-1955	Succeeded by Sir Michael J Hogan
