= William Henry Adams =

British politician, lawyer and colonial judge

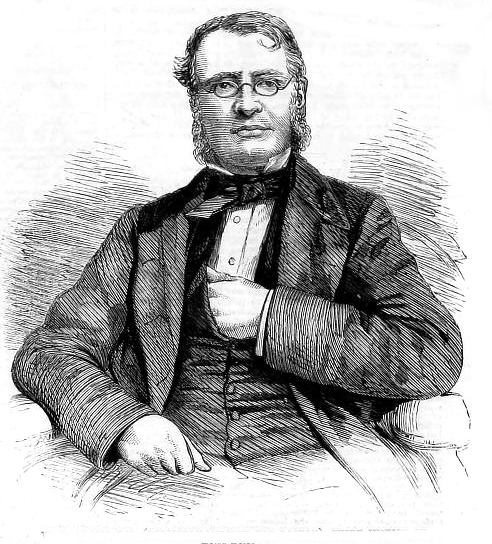

William Henry Adams (1809 – 29 August 1865) was a British politician (Conservative Party), lawyer and colonial judge. His final appointment was as Chief Justice of Hong Kong.

== Early life ==
Adams was born in 1809 and was the son of Thomas Adams, Steward of Norman Cross Prison, Huntingdonshire. While still a boy he entered a printing office as a compositor. He read law in his spare time and in 1843 was called to the bar of the Middle Temple. He also worked as a law reporter for the Morning Herald.

== Political career ==
Adams was elected unopposed at the 1857 general election as one of the two members of parliament (MPs) for Boston in Lincolnshire, having contested the seat unsuccessfully at the 1852 general election and at a by-election in 1856. He was re-elected unopposed in February 1859 at a by-election following his appointment as Recorder of Derby, but did not stand again at the general election in April 1859.

== Legal career ==
His first judicial appointment was as Recorder of Derby in 1858 while still a member of Parliament.

In 1859, Adams was appointed Attorney General of Hong Kong. Immediately on his arrival in Hong Kong in September 1859, Adams was appointed acting Chief Justice to replace John Walter Hulme who had returned to England on sick leave. In his first appearance on the bench "the general consensus of opinion seems to have been one of confidence in his firmness and ability." In August 1860, Hulme retired on a pension and Adams was appointed Chief Justice.

== Death ==
Adams fell ill in 1865 and died, at the age of 56, at the home of his son Captain Adams in Wales on 29 August 1865. Adams had been well liked in Hong Kong and a local paper carried the following eulogy:

"It is almost too painful for us to speak of his many estimable qualities, at a time when admiration ought properly give way to grief. There cannot be two opinions as to the ability with which he discharged the duties of his office. A juster more conscientious and abler man never sat upon the Bench in this Colony. Every one must admit that his judgements were delivered with care and with admirable wisdom. He was one of best men that ever came to China or left it."

Parliament of the United Kingdom
Preceded by Benjamin Bond Cabbell; Herbert Ingram	Member of Parliament for Boston; 1857 – 1859; With: Herbert Ingram	Succeeded by Meaburn Staniland; Herbert Ingram
Legal offices
Preceded by John Walter Hulme	Chief Justice of Hong Kong; 1860–1865	Succeeded by John Jackson Smale
Preceded by Thomas Chisholm Anstey	Attorney General of Hong Kong; 1859–1860	Succeeded by John Jackson Smale
