= Henry Blackall =

Irish lawyer and judge

Sir Henry Blackall

Sir Henry William Butler Blackall QC (19 June 1889 – 1 November 1981) was an Irish lawyer and judge. He served as Attorney General of two British colonies in the mid 20th Century and served as Chief Justice of Trinidad and Tobago and Chief Justice of Hong Kong. His last position before retirement was as President of the West African Court of Appeal.

== Early life ==
Blackall was born in Limerick, the son of Henry Blackall of Garden Hill, County Limerick, and Isabella Emily Butler. His father was a solicitor and member of the Council of the Incorporated Law Society of Ireland. On his mother's side, he was a member of the Dunboyne family.

Blackall was educated at Stonyhurst College. He obtained his Bachelor of Arts degree and Bachelor of Laws (1st place) from Trinity College Dublin. He was called to the Irish Bar in 1912. He served in World War I from 1914 to 1918.

== Legal appointments ==
In 1919, Blackall was appointed Crown Counsel in Kenya and a member of the Legislative Council in 1920.

In 1923, he was appointed Crown Counsel in Nigeria. He served in Nigeria until 1931 and acted as solicitor general for various periods. He then served as Attorney General in Cyprus from 1932 to 1936 and then in the Gold Coast from 1936 to 1943. He was made a Queen's Counsel while serving in Cyprus.

In 1943 he was appointed Chief Justice of Trinidad and Tobago and President of the West Indian Court of Appeal.

At the end of World War II, in 1946, he was appointed Chief Justice of Hong Kong replacing Sir Atholl MacGregor. In 1948, he was appointed President of the West African Court of Appeal.

== Retirement and death ==
Blackall retired in 1951 and pursued his interest in genealogy, writing at least two books on the subject: The Butlers of County Clare and The Galweys & Gallweys of Munster. In 1976 he was living in Cyprus.

He was conferred an Honorary LLD by Dublin University. He died in 1981 in Nicosia, Cyprus.

Legal offices
Preceded by Sir Atholl MacGregor	Chief Justice of Hong Kong; 1946-1948	Succeeded by Sir Leslie Bertram Gibson
