= Ivo Rigby =

British lawyer and judge (1911–1987)

Sir Dato Setia Ivo Rigby DSNB
- Rigby, c. 1964

Chief Justice of the Supreme Court of Hong Kong
- In office 1970–1973
- Preceded by: Michael Hogan
- Succeeded by: Geoffrey Briggs

Personal details
- Born: Ivo Charles Clayton Rigby; 19 April 1911 Yarmouth, Norfolk, England
- Died: 2 June 1987 (aged 76) Brunei
- Spouse(s): Agnes Bothway (m. 1937; div. 1948) Kathleen Nancy Jones (m. 1948)
- Occupation: Barrister; judge
- Military career
- Allegiance: United Kingdom
- Branch: British Army
- Service years: 1931–1935
- Units: 13th London Regiment; 5th Battalion Norfolks

Ivo Charles Clayton Rigby (2 June 1911 – 19 April 1987) was a British lawyer and judge. He was Chief Justice of Hong Kong in the early 1970s.

== Early life and education ==
Rigby was born on 2 June 1911, in Yarmouth, Norfolk, England, and was a member of the Church of England. He was the only son of James Philip Clayton Rigby. He received his education at Magdalen College School in Oxford from October 1921 to June 1929, after which he began with his admission to legal studies in 1928, on 16 April 1928, and culminated in his call to the Bar on 8 June 1932. During this time, Rigby also serving in the Territorial Army in London and Norwich from 1931 to 1935. In June 1932, he was called to the Bar at the Inner Temple in London.

== Legal career ==
Rigby began his legal career practising at the Bar at the Inner Temple and on the South Eastern Circuit, working in London and Norwich from June 1932 to September 1935. He then entered colonial service as Police Magistrate in Bathurst, Gambia, from October 1935 to January 1938. In 1941, he was appointed Crown Counsel and later served as President of the District Court in Palestine, sitting in Jerusalem, Tel Aviv, and Haifa until July 1948. During this time, he served in the Palestine Volunteer Defence Force from 1941 until its disbandment in 1943.

Rigby's judicial career continued with his appointment as Assistant Judge in Nyasaland, residing in Blantyre from September 1948 to April 1954. He then served as President of the Sessions Court in Kuala Lumpur, Malaya, from October 1954 to January 1956, and as Puisne Judge in Penang from January 1956 to August 1961. On 10 August 1961, he was appointed Puisne Judge of Hong Kong, arriving on 17 August. He served multiple terms as Acting Chief Justice between 1962 and 1970, and in 1962, Rigby presided over the "Three Wolves Case" in Hong Kong, involving three individuals convicted of murder and kidnapping for crimes committed between 1959 and 1961; they became the last people executed for murder under British rule. He was formally appointed Chief Justice of Hong Kong on 7 January 1970.

On 9 April 1970, Rigby was appointed Chief Justice of Brunei by Sultan Hassanal Bolkiah, succeeding Michael Hogan. The following year, on 25 March 1971, he sentenced 19-year-old Graham Edwards to death after a Hong Kong jury found him guilty of murdering British scientist Ronald Alan Coombe. Rigby retired to England in 1973.

== Later life and death ==
On 31 October 1975, Rigby was appointed Recorder under section 21 of the Courts Act 1971 by Warrant under the royal sign-manual of Queen Elizabeth II, with effect from 10 November 1975. On 23 June 1976, the queen appointed Rigby as a Metropolitan Stipendiary Magistrate, with effect from 28 June 1976, by Warrant under Her Royal Sign Manual.

Rigby died on 19 April 1987 at the age of 75 in Brunei.

== Personal life ==
Rigby married Agnes Bothway from Norwich in Madeira in 1937, later divorcing in 1948 and remarrying Kathleen Nancy Jones in London on 3 June 1948.

Rigby was runner-up in the lightweight division of the Territorial Army Officers' Boxing Championships in 1932 and played hockey for Norfolk County. He authored The Law Reports of Nyasaland 1934–52 and was active in public life in Hong Kong, serving as president of the Society for the Prevention of Cruelty to Animals and chairman of the Hong Kong Squash Association. He was also a member of numerous clubs, including the East India and Sports Club in London and the Hong Kong Club. He co-owned the racehorse "Mabrouk," a multiple winner, and purchased another named "Inshallah" in 1968.

== Honours ==
Rigby has been bestowed the following honours:

- General Service Medal (1918) with Palestine and Palestine 1945–48 clasps
- Queen Elizabeth II Coronation Medal (1953)
- Knight Bachelor (1964) – Sir
- Order of Setia Negara Brunei Second Class (DSNB) – Dato Setia

Legal offices
| Preceded by Sir Michael J Hogan | Chief Justice of Hong Kong; 1970-1973 | Succeeded by Sir Geoffrey Briggs |
