= John Jackson Smale =

British lawyer and judge (1805-1882)

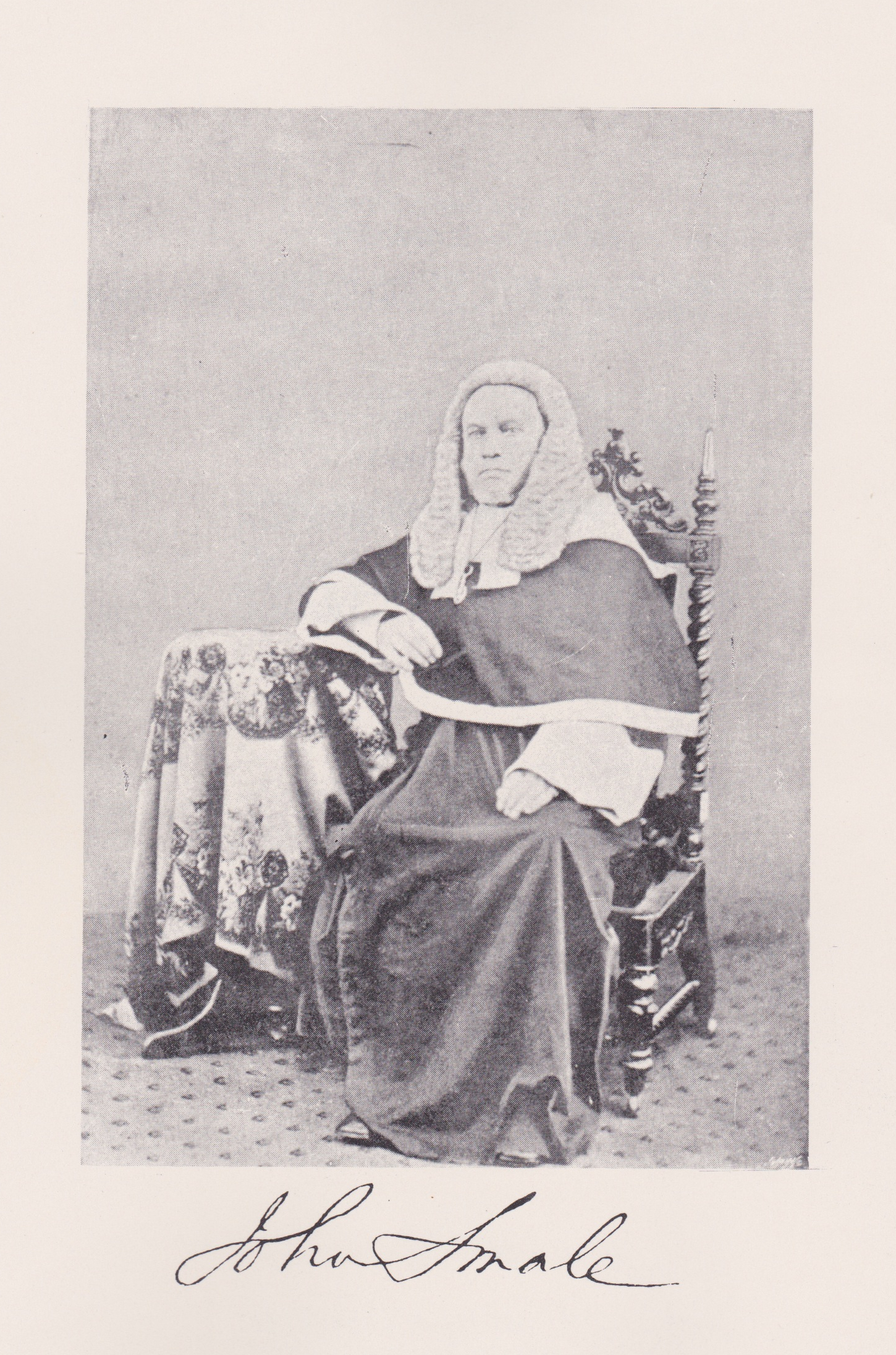

Chief Justice of Hong Kong
- In office 1866–1881
- Preceded by: William Henry Adams
- Succeeded by: Sir George Phillippo

Personal details
- Born: 1 March 1805 Devon, England
- Died: 13 August 1882 (aged 77) England
- Resting place: Highgate Cemetery

Sir John Jackson Smale (1 March 1805 – 13 August 1882) was a British lawyer and judge. He served as Attorney General and the longest-serving Chief Justice of Hong Kong.

== Early life ==
Smale was born on 1 March 1805 in Devon, England. He was the son of John Smale.

He studied in Manchester and the Inner Temple. He was admitted by the Inner Temple in 1828 but then qualified and practised as a solicitor. He was called to the bar of the Inner Temple in 1842. He practised at the Chancery Bar for eleven years from 1846 to 1857 and was noted as a law reporter, being one of the joint authors of "De Gex and Smale" (Reports of Cases decided in the High Court of Chancery, by Knight-Bruce, V.C., and Parker, V.C., 1849–1853, 5 vols., with John Peter De Gex), and "Smale and Gifford".

== Legal appointments ==
In 1860 he was appointed Attorney General of Hong Kong. He arrived in Hong Kong Kong on 22 April 1861. On 14 June 1861, he was appointed as a member of the Hong Kong Legislative Council. As Attorney General he was allowed to maintain a private practice and practised with much success.

On 24 October 1866, he was appointed as Chief Justice of Hong Kong replacing William Henry Adams who had died in office. He served as Chief Justice until his retirement in 1881.

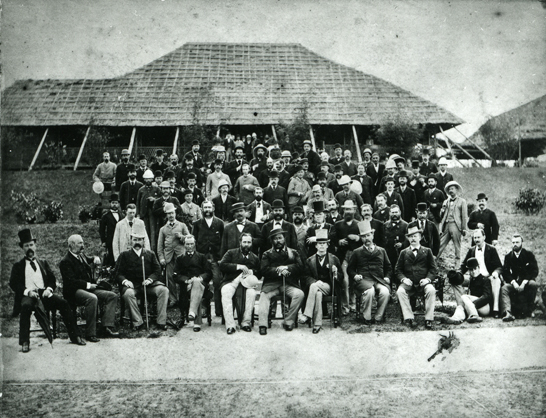
Hawaiian King Kalakaua visits Hong Kong in 1881. Smale is standing behind Governor Hennessy

As Chief Justice he was described as "somewhat lacking in the qualities necessary to maintain the dignity of his high office." He was said to be "naturally of a temperament singularly impulsive and energetic and never succeeded in sinking the man and his natural propensities in the Judge; the consequence was that from time to time objectionable and occasionally disgraceful scenes were presented in court."

The best example of this was the case of Pollard v The Chief Justice of Hong Kong where the Judicial Committee of the Privy Council overturned a finding of contempt Smale had made against Edward Pollard QC on the basis that Smale had not told Pollard what the alleged contempts were before convicting him.

Smale was knighted in 1874.

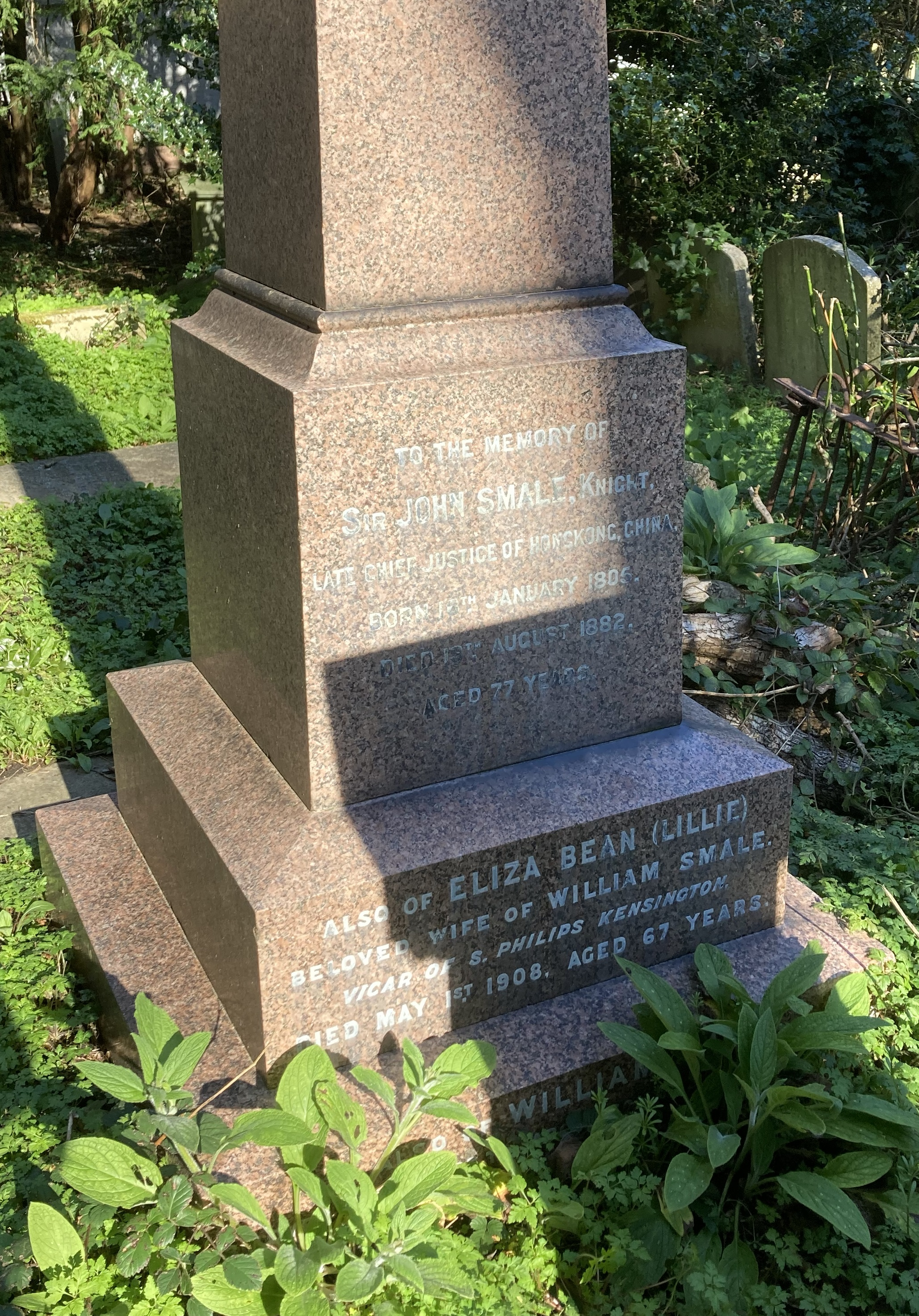
Grave of Sir John Smale in Highgate Cemetery

== Important issues ==
As Attorney General, Smale was instrumental in bringing about the de-amalgamation of the solicitors' and barristers' professions in Hong Kong. Until his arrival solicitors and barristers had been able to practise without restrictions. Wigs had also not been worn in court. Smale in his first appearance in court wore a wig. Subsequently, he worked for the repeal of the Amalgamation Ordinance that had allowed barristers and solicitors to practise in any capacity. As Chief Justice when admitting barristers he would remind them that they were to act only as barrister. An example can be found in Nicholas John Hannen's admission in 1868.

Smale was strongly against slavery. In 1871, Kwok A Sing, a coolie on board a French ship the Nouvelle Penelope which had sailed from Macau killed the master and took over the ship landing in Pakha in China where the ship was abandoned. Kwok was arrested in Hong Kong to be extradited to China. Kwok made a habeas corpus application seeking his release. Smale ordered his release on the basis that the Nouvelle Penelope was a slave ship and Kwok was entitled to take any necessary steps to secure his freedom. Julian Pauncefote, the Attorney General of Hong Kong, then had him re-arrested to be tried for piracy. Smale again ordered his release on the basis the second arrest breached the first habeas corpus order. Kwok then sued Pauncefote for damages for false imprisonment under the Habeas Corpus Act. Kwok almost won with the British jury finding 4–3 in Kwok's favour, just one shy of the required majority of five. Smale's first decision was upheld by the Privy Council.

== Marriages ==
Smale married twice, first to Anne Jackson (died 1868) and then in 1873 to Clara Janson, a wealthy descendant of the Wensleydale I'Anson Quakers, in St John's Cathedral, Hong Kong.

== Death ==
After his retirement in 1881, Smale returned to England, dying at his home on 13 August 1882. Upon news of his death reaching Hong Kong, his successor as Chief Justice of Hong Kong, Sir George Phillippo, adjourned the court as a mark of respect. He is buried on the western side of Highgate Cemetery.

Legal offices
Preceded by William Henry Adams	Chief Justice of Hong Kong; 1866–1881	Succeeded by George Phillippo
Preceded by William Henry Adams	Attorney General of Hong Kong; 1860–1866	Succeeded by Julian Pauncefote
