= Chief Judicial Commissioner for the Western Pacific =

The Chief Justice of the High Commissioner's Court, more commonly known as the Chief Judicial Commissioner for the Western Pacific, was the chief judicial officer for matters under the jurisdiction of the Western Pacific High Commission, a British Empire body.

The court and role of chief justice were established by the Western Pacific Orders-in-Council 1877 (amended in 1879 and 1880), and by the Pacific Order-in-Council 1893. (Note: "B. (1.) The Chief Justice and every other judge for the time being of the Supreme Court, shall be, by virtue of his office, a Judicial Commissioner for the Western Pacific for the purposes of this Order, and is in this Order referred to as a Judicial Commissioner. (2.) Where, in the opinion of the High Commissioner, the attendance of a Judicial Commissioner holding office as aforesaid is impracticable, or would be inconvenient, the High Commissioner may from time to time in the name and on behalf of Her Majesty, by writing under his hand and seal, appoint a person of legal knowledge and experience to be a Judicial Commissioner for particular purposes or for a particular time. The London Gazette, 8 September 1893 (26439), pp. 5119-5121.) Headed by a High Commissioner for the Western Pacific, who was also ex officio the Governor of Fiji, until the end of 1952, it included numerous islands, mostly small, throughout Oceania. Composition varied over time, but Fiji (1877–1952) and the Solomon Islands (1893–1976) were its most durable members.

From 1877 through 1961, the Chief Justice of Fiji was ex officio Chief Judicial Commissioner, apart from a three-year suspension of the High Commission from 1942 through 1945 during the War in the Pacific, when many of Britain's colonies in Oceania were under either military administration or Japanese occupation. Appeals lay to the Judicial Committee of the Privy Council in London.

From the beginning of 1953, Fiji and Tonga were separated from the High Commission as a prelude to full independence, and the High Commission offices were transferred to Honiara on Guadalcanal in the Solomon Islands, with the Governor of the Solomon Islands now being the High Commissioner ex officio. The High Commissioner's Court, however, continued to meet in Suva, with the Chief Justice of Fiji continuing as Chief Judicial Commissioner for another decade, until 1962, when the two offices were separated. Under the Western Pacific (Courts) Order in Council, gazetted on 15 August 1961 and effective from 9 April 1962, the High Commissioner's Court was renamed the High Court of the Western Pacific and relocated to the Solomon Islands. The court consisted of a Chief Justice (as the office of Chief Judicial Commissioner was renamed – no longer the Chief Justice of Fiji) and two puisne judges, one based in Port Vila, New Hebrides (now Vanuatu), and the other in Tarawa, Gilbert and Ellice Islands (now Kiribati and Tuvalu).

Most of the island groups had gained either independence or internal self-government by 1971. On 2 January 1976 after nearly all had been given separate statehood, the office of High Commissioner and the entity of the Pacific Territories were abolished. The High Commission of the Western Pacific was abolished, the last archives being finally packed up in Honiara in August 1978. A remnant of the High Commission was the right of appeal from the courts of many island nations to the Court of Appeal of Fiji, then a right of appeal to the Judicial Committee of the Privy Council, which persisted into the late 1970s.

== List of Chief Judicial Commissioners ==
#	Incumbent	Portrait	Tenure		Head of State	Notes
#	Incumbent	Portrait	Took office	Left office	Head of State	Notes
Chief Judicial Commissioner for the Western Pacific and Chief Justice of Fiji (1877–1962)
1.	Sir John Gorrie		1877	1882	Victoria	
	Sir Fielding Clarke; Acting		1882	1882	Victoria	
2.	Sir Henry Wrenfordsley		1882	1885	Victoria	
	Sir Fielding Clarke; Acting for Wrenfordsley		1884	1885	Victoria	
3.	Sir Fielding Clarke		1885	1889	Victoria	
4.	Sir Henry Berkeley		1889	1902	Victoria; Edward VII	
5.	Sir Charles Major		1902	1914	Edward VII; George V	
	Albert Ehrhardt Acting for Major		1910	21 February 1911	Edward VII; George V	Ehrhardt, the then Attorney-General of Fiji, acted as Chief Judicial Commissioner while Major, the incumbent Chief Judicial Commissioner, was acting as High Commissioner for the Western Pacific.
6.	Sir Charles Davson		1914	1922	George V	
	Sir Kenneth Muir MacKenzie; Acting		1922	1923	George V	
7.	Sir Alfred Young, KC		1923	1929	George V	
8.	Sir Maxwell Anderson, CBE, KC, RN (retd.)		1929	1936	George V Edward VIII	
9.	Sir Owen Corrie, MC		1936	1945	Edward VIII; George VI	
10.	Sir Claud Seton, MC		1945	22 November 1949	George V	
11.	Sir James Thomson		1949	1953	George VI; Elizabeth II	
12.	Sir Ragnar Hyne		1953	1958	Elizabeth II	
13.	Sir Albert Lowe		1958	1962	Elizabeth II	
Chief Justice of the High Court of the Western Pacific (1962–1976)
14.	Sir Geoffrey Briggs		1962	1965	Elizabeth II	
15.	Sir Jocelyn Bodilly, R.N.V.R., VRD		14 June 1965	1975	Elizabeth II	
