= John Hendry Anderson =

John Hendry Anderson (May 1854 – 11 November 1913), was a rector in the Church of England, a schoolmaster, and Mayor of Wandsworth. He was instrumental in creating Tooting Bathing-Lake in London.

He was born in Old Machar, a parish and district of Aberdeen, the son of Rev. William Anderson He gained his M.A. from Aberdeen University in 1874, becoming a deacon in the Church of England in 1877 and was ordained priest by the bishop of Norwich in 1878. In the same year he married Alice Hornor, who was born in Norwich. In 1879 he was appointed assistant Master at the Portsmouth Grammar School and curate of All Saints' church, Portsmouth. By 1891 he was Second Master at the Grammar School and curate of St Peter's, Portsea where he lived at 2, Clifton Terrace. In the same year Anderson moved back to Norfolk as Rector of Foulsham.

He was appointed rector of Tooting Graveney in 1897, and was elected to the LCC as an independent councillor. He was Mayor of Wandsworth in 1904–05.

He was instrumental in the creation of Tooting Public Library (1902) and Tooting Bathing-Lake (1906). He died in Tooting in 1913, where there is a memorial to him in Holy Trinity church, Tooting.

His son, Maxwell Hendry Anderson, was a naval barrister who became Chief Justice of Fiji and Chief Judicial Commissioner for the Western Pacific.

== Legacy ==
Anderson House, Fountain Road, Tooting, London, is named after him. These two storey council flats were built in 1932 as part of the Council's slum clearance programme in Tooting.
