= Percy McElwaine =

Irish lawyer and judge (1884–1969)

The Honourable Sir Percy Alexander McElwaine KC
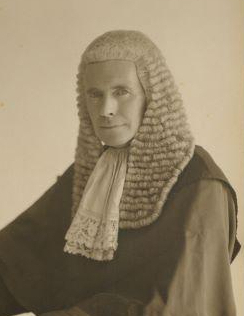
- McElwaine in 1933

13th Attorney General of Fiji
- In office 1927–1931
- Monarch: George V
- Governor: Sir Eyre Hutson; Sir Arthur Fletcher
- Preceded by: Sir Kenneth MacKenzie
- Succeeded by: Charles Gough Howell

11th Attorney-General of Singapore
- In office 21 April 1933 – 10 August 1936
- Monarchs: George V Edward VIII
- Governor: Sir Cecil Clementi; Sir Shenton Thomas
- Preceded by: Walter Clarance Huggard
- Succeeded by: Newnham Arthur Worley

13th Chief Justice of the Straits Settlements
- In office 1936–1946
- Monarchs: Edward VIII; George VI
- Governor: Sir Shenton Thomas
- Preceded by: Walter Clarance Huggard
- Succeeded by: Cecil William Victor Carey; As Chief Justice of Singapore

Personal details
- Born: 21 September 1884 Roscommon, Ireland
- Died: 24 October 1969 (aged 85) Devon, England
- Spouse(s): 1. Evelyn Annie Forsaith Macnaught; 17 June 1914 – 1918 (her death); 2. Margaret McElwaine
- Children: 2 sons
- Education: Trinity College, Dublin

Military service
- Rank: Lieutenant
- Unit: Royal Irish Rifles

Sir Percy Alexander McElwaine KC (21 September 1884 – 24 October 1969) was a lawyer and judge who served, inter alia, as Attorney General of Fiji and Chief Justice of the Straits Settlements.

== Early life ==
McElwaine was born in Roscommon, Ireland, and was educated at Campbell College in Belfast and at Trinity College Dublin. He was admitted to the Irish bar in 1908 and the Alberta bar in 1913. In the First World War, he was a temporary lieutenant in the Fourteenth Royal Irish Rifles.

== Marriages ==
McElwaine married Evelyn Annie Forsaith Macnaught at St Mary Le Park in Battersea, London, on 17 June 1914. She died in the 1918 influenza epidemic on 10 November 1918. She was pregnant at the time of her death. His second wife, Margaret, was a popular socialite during their time in Singapore. They had two sons, David Eric and Ian Douglas.

== Legal, political and judicial career ==
McElwaine was made acting Solicitor General of Kenya on 15 October 1925, and a nominated official (i.e., ex officio) member of the Legislative Council of Kenya on 28 October.

After being appointed a Senior Crown Counsel in British Kenya on 1 January 1926, McElwaine served another spell in the Legislative Council from 11 April 1927, when he was appointed to fill in for Frederic Gordon Smith during his absence. The appointment was evidently renewed on 11 May, but terminated on 4 August that year, on the permanent appointment of Thomas Dundas Hope Bruce.

McElwaine was subsequently Attorney General of Fiji from 1927 to 1931 under Governors Sir Eyre Hutson and Sir Arthur Fletcher. In 1930, he moved to Singapore to take up the position of Deputy Public Prosecutor. He went on to become Attorney General of the Straits Settlements on 21 April 1933. He remained in this office until 10 August 1936. He then became Chief Justice of the Straits Settlements (Penang, Malacca and Singapore) from 1936 to 1946. He was knighted in 1939. His photograph is in a display at the former Supreme Court of Singapore, now called The Arts House.

While Chief Justice of the Straits Settlements, McElwaine was unsympathetic to the idea of appointing "Asiatics", as he called Asians, to senior judicial posts. "I am doubtful whether any Asiatic is suitable for the post of Registrar of the Supreme Court, whatever his professional qualifications be," he declared on 29 August 1938.

During the Second World War, he was imprisoned for six months in Changi Prison and afterwards in Taiwan (where he wrote notes on his life which are now kept at the Imperial War Museum in London) and Mukden in Manchuria.

He died on 24 October 1969 in Devon, at the age of 85.

Political offices
Preceded by	Member of the Legislative Council of Kenya; 1925	Succeeded by
Preceded by Frederick Gordon Smith	Member of the Legislative Council of Kenya; 1927	Succeeded by Thomas Dundas Hope Bruce
Legal offices
Preceded by	Solicitor General of British Kenya; Acting; 1925	Succeeded by
Preceded by Sir Kenneth MacKenzie	Attorney-General of Fiji; 1927-1931	Succeeded by Alfred Karney Young
Preceded by Walter Clarance Huggard	Attorney-General of Singapore; 1933-1936	Succeeded by Newnham Arthur Worley; Acting
Preceded by Walter Clarance Huggard	Chief Justice of the Straits Settlements; 1936-1946	Succeeded by Cecil William Victor Carey; Acting
