= Fielding Clarke =

British colonial judge

The Honourable Sir Fielding Clarke
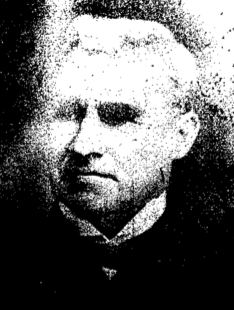
- Sir Fielding Clarke, Chief Justice of Fiji, Hong Kong and Jamaica

6th Attorney General of Fiji
- In office 1881–1885
- Monarch: Victoria
- Governor: Sir William Des Vœux
- Preceded by: Joseph Garrick
- Succeeded by: Henry Spencer Berkeley

Acting Chief Judicial Commissioner for the Western Pacific
- In office 1882–1883
- Monarch: Victoria
- High Commissioner: Sir William Des Vœux
- Preceded by: Sir John Gorrie
- Succeeded by: Sir Henry Wrenfordsley

Acting Chief Justice of Fiji
- In office 1882–1883
- Monarch: Victoria
- Governor: Sir William Des Vœux
- Preceded by: Sir John Gorrie
- Succeeded by: Sir Henry Wrenfordsley

Acting Chief Judicial Commissioner for the Western Pacific
- In office 1884–1884
- Monarch: Victoria
- High Commissioner: Sir William Des Vœux
- Preceded by: Sir Henry Wrenfordsley
- Succeeded by: Himself; As substantive Chief Judicial Commissioner

Acting Chief Justice of Fiji
- In office 1884–1884
- Monarch: Victoria
- Governor: Sir William Des Vœux
- Preceded by: Sir Henry Wrenfordsley
- Succeeded by: Himself; As substantive Chief Justice

3rd Chief Judicial Commissioner for the Western Pacific
- In office 1885–1889
- Monarch: Victoria
- High Commissioner: Sir John Thurston (acting); Sir Charles Mitchell; Sir John Thurston
- Preceded by: Himself; As acting Chief Judicial Commissioner
- Succeeded by: Sir Henry Spencer Berkeley

5th Chief Justice of Fiji
- In office 1885–1889
- Monarch: Victoria
- Governor: Sir John Thurston(acting); Sir Charles Mitchell; Sir John Thurston
- Preceded by: Himself; As acting Chief Justice
- Succeeded by: Sir Henry Spencer Berkeley

6th Chief Justice of the Supreme Court of Hong Kong
- In office 1892–1896
- Monarch: Victoria
- Governor: Sir William Robinson
- Preceded by: Sir James Russell
- Succeeded by: Sir John Carrington

9th Chief Justice of Jamaica
- In office 1896–1911
- Monarchs: Victoria, Edward VII, George V
- Governor: Sir Henry Norman
- Preceded by: Henry Burford-Hancock
- Succeeded by: Anthony Coll

Personal details
- Born: 23 February 1851
- Died: 30 July 1928 (aged 77) Essex, England
- Spouse: Mary (May) Milward Pierce
- Education: University of London; Middle Temple

Sir Fielding Clarke (23 February 1851 – 30 July 1928) was a British colonial barrister, civil servant and jurist. He served as Chief Justice of Fiji, Hong Kong and Jamaica.

== Early life ==
Clarke was the fourth son of Henry Booth Clarke and his wife Isabella. He married in 1888 Mary (May) Milward Pierce, the daughter of Mr Justice Timbrell Pierce D.L.

== Education ==
Clarke was educated in Switzerland and then returned to England to attend King's College London and London University (LLB). On 12 November 1872 he was admitted to Middle Temple and in 1876 was called to the bar of the Middle Temple.

== Career ==
After being called to the Bar, Clarke practised on the North Eastern Circuit.

In 1881, he embarked on career as a civil servant and jurist in various British colonies. In that year, he was appointed Attorney General of Fiji in 1881 and served in that position until 1885. He acted as Chief Justice of Fiji and Chief Judicial Commissioner, Western Pacific from 1882 to 1883 and in 1884. In 1885 he was appointed Chief Justice of Fiji & Chief Judicial Commissioner, Western Pacific. He served in that position until 1889.

In 1889, he was appointed Puisne Judge, of the Supreme Court of Hong Kong.

In 1892 he was appointed Chief Justice of Hong Kong succeeding Sir James Russell.

Clarke was knighted in 1894 while Chief Justice of Hong Kong.

In 1896 he was appointed as Chief Justice of Jamaica and served in that position until 1911 when he retired. He moved to Southchurch, Essex and later lived in Stifford, Essex.

In retirement, he was appointed, in 1916, to the Appeal Tribunal for the County of Essex created under the Military Service Act 1916 which introduced conscription.

== Death ==
Clarke died on 30 July 1928 in Essex, England.

Legal offices
Preceded by Joseph Garrick	Acting; Attorney General of Fiji; 1876 — 1882	Succeeded by Henry Spencer Berkeley
Preceded by Sir John Gorrie	Acting; Chief Justice of Fiji; 1882	Succeeded by Henry Wrenfordsley
Preceded by Sir John Gorrie	Acting; Chief Judicial Commissioner for the Western Pacific; 1882	Succeeded by Henry Wrenfordsley
Preceded by Sir Henry Wrenfordsley	Acting; Chief Justice of Fiji; 1884 — 1885	Succeeded by Himself; As substantive Chief Justice
Preceded by Sir Henry Wrenfordsley	Acting; Chief Judicial Commissioner for the Western Pacific; 1884 — 1885	Succeeded by Himself; As substantive Chief Judicial Commissioner
Preceded by Himself; As acting Chief Justice	Chief Justice of Fiji; 1885 — 1889	Succeeded by Henry Spencer Berkeley
Preceded by Himself; As acting Chief Judicial Commissioner	Chief Judicial Commissioner for the Western Pacific; 1885 — 1889	Succeeded by Henry Spencer Berkeley
Preceded by Sir James Russell	Chief Justice of Hong Kong; 1892 — 1896	Succeeded by Sir John Carrington
Preceded by Henry Burford-Hancock	Chief Justice of Jamaica; 1896 — 1911	Succeeded by Anthony Coll
