= Ragnar Hyne =

Norway-born lawyer

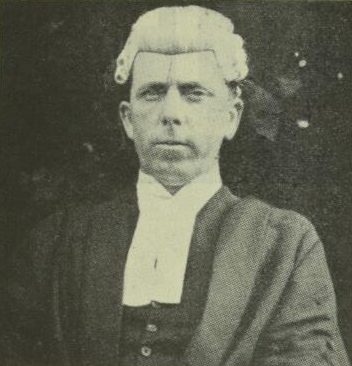

Chief Justice of Fiji and Chief Judicial Commissioner for the Western Pacific
- In office 1953–1958
- Preceded by: James Beveridge Thomson
- Succeeded by: Albert George Lowe

Attorney-General of Sierra Leone
- In office 1945–1948

Chief Justice of Tonga
- In office 1936–1938

Personal details
- Born: 1893; Randsfjord, Norway
- Died: 4 October 1966; United Kingdom

Sir Ragnar Hyne KBE (1893 – 4 October 1966) was a Norway-born lawyer who served in several British colonies. He was Attorney General of Sierra Leone and Chief Justice in both Fiji and Tonga.

== Biography ==
Born in Randsfjord in Norway, Hyne graduated from the University of Queensland. He worked for the Queensland Education Service until serving in the army during World War I. Following the war, he was appointed Director of Education in Tonga in 1920, a position he held until 1929. He married Dorothy Harpur (a daughter of Queensland Supreme Court judge John Laskey Woolcock) in November 1920, and was called to the bar in Queensland in 1924. After Dorothy died in 1924, he married Effie Harris in 1930.

He was appointed Legal Advisor to the government and Chief Police Magistrate of the British Solomon Islands Protectorate in 1929. In May 1932 he returned to Tonga as Director of Education, and was appointed Secretary to the Premier a month later. In January 1933 he became Chief Police Magistrate and Legal Advisor. Between January and October 1934 he served as Acting Chief Justice, also holding the post between January 1935 and June 1936. In June 1936 he was formally appointed Chief Justice, a role he held until April 1938. He also served as Acting British Consul to Tonga in 1937. In 1938 he returned to the Solomon Islands to become Chief Magistrate.

In 1942 he relocated to Fiji, where he was appointed Assistant Legal Advisor to the Western Pacific High Commission and a resident magistrate. He left Fiji in 1944 and was appointed Solicitor-General of Sierra Leone. The following year he became Attorney-General, also served as Acting Governor. After a brief spell in England, he returned to Africa to become a member of the Supreme Court of Ghana. He was called to the bar in England in 1950.

Hyne returned to Fiji in 1953 to become Chief Justice and Chief Judicial Commissioner for the Western Pacific. He was knighted in the 1956 New Year Honours. He retired from his posts in Fiji in 1958, after which he was appointed to legal positions in Cyprus and Gibraltar.

He died in England in October 1966 at the age of 73.
