= Alfred Karney Young =

British barrister and judge (1865–1942)

The Honourable Sir Alfred Karney Young KC

Attorney General of British East Africa
- In office 1906–c.1909
- Monarch: Edward VII

Chief Justice of the Seychelles
- In office 1909–c.1914
- Monarchs: Edward VII; George V
- Governor: Sir Walter Davidson; Sir Charles O'Brien

11th Attorney-General of Fiji
- In office 1914–1922
- Monarch: George V
- Governor: Sir Ernest Sweet-Escott; Sir Cecil Hunter-Rodwell
- Preceded by: Albert Ehrhardt
- Succeeded by: Sir Kenneth MacKenzie

. Chief Justice of the Leeward Islands
- In office 1920–1921
- Monarch: George V
- Governor: Sir Edward Merewether

7th Chief Judicial Commissioner for the Western Pacific
- In office 1923–1929
- Monarch: George V
- Governor: Sir Cecil Hunter Rodwell; Sir Eyre Hutson
- Preceded by: Sir Kenneth MacKenzie
- Succeeded by: Sir Maxwell Hendry Maxwell-Anderson

9th Chief Justice of Fiji
- In office 1923–1929
- Monarch: George V
- Governor: Sir Cecil Hunter Rodwell; Sir Eyre Hutson
- Preceded by: Sir Kenneth MacKenzie
- Succeeded by: Sir Maxwell Hendry Maxwell-Anderson

Personal details
- Born: 1 August 1864 Victoria, Colony of Vancouver Island
- Died: 5 January 1942 (aged 77) Tamboerskloof, Union of South Africa
- Spouse: Frances May Miller (m. 1930)
- Education: Magdalen College, Oxford
- Occupation: Lawyer, Jurist

Sir Alfred Joseph Karney Young KC (1 August 1864 – 5 January 1942) was a British barrister and judge. He held a number of political and judicial offices, including Attorney General of British East Africa, Chief Justice of the Seychelles, Attorney General of Fiji, Chief Justice of the Leeward Islands, Chief Justice of Fiji, and Chief Judicial Commissioner for the Western Pacific.

== Early life and family ==
Alfred Young was born in Victoria, Colony of Vancouver Island, where his father, William Alexander George Young (c1827-1885) (later Sir William Young, CMG), was Colonial Secretary and also acting Colonial Secretary of Vancouver Island. His mother was Cecilia Eliza Cowan Cameron.

Alfred Young was the youngest of three children. His brother was Sir William Douglas Young (1859–1943), Governor of the Falkland Islands from 1915 to 1920. His sister was Mary Alice Young (b. 1862), who married Frederick Mitchell Hodgson, later Governor of Gold Coast like her father.

He was educated in England at St. Mark's School, Windsor (later Imperial Service College) until 1884, and graduated from Magdalen College, Oxford in 1887.

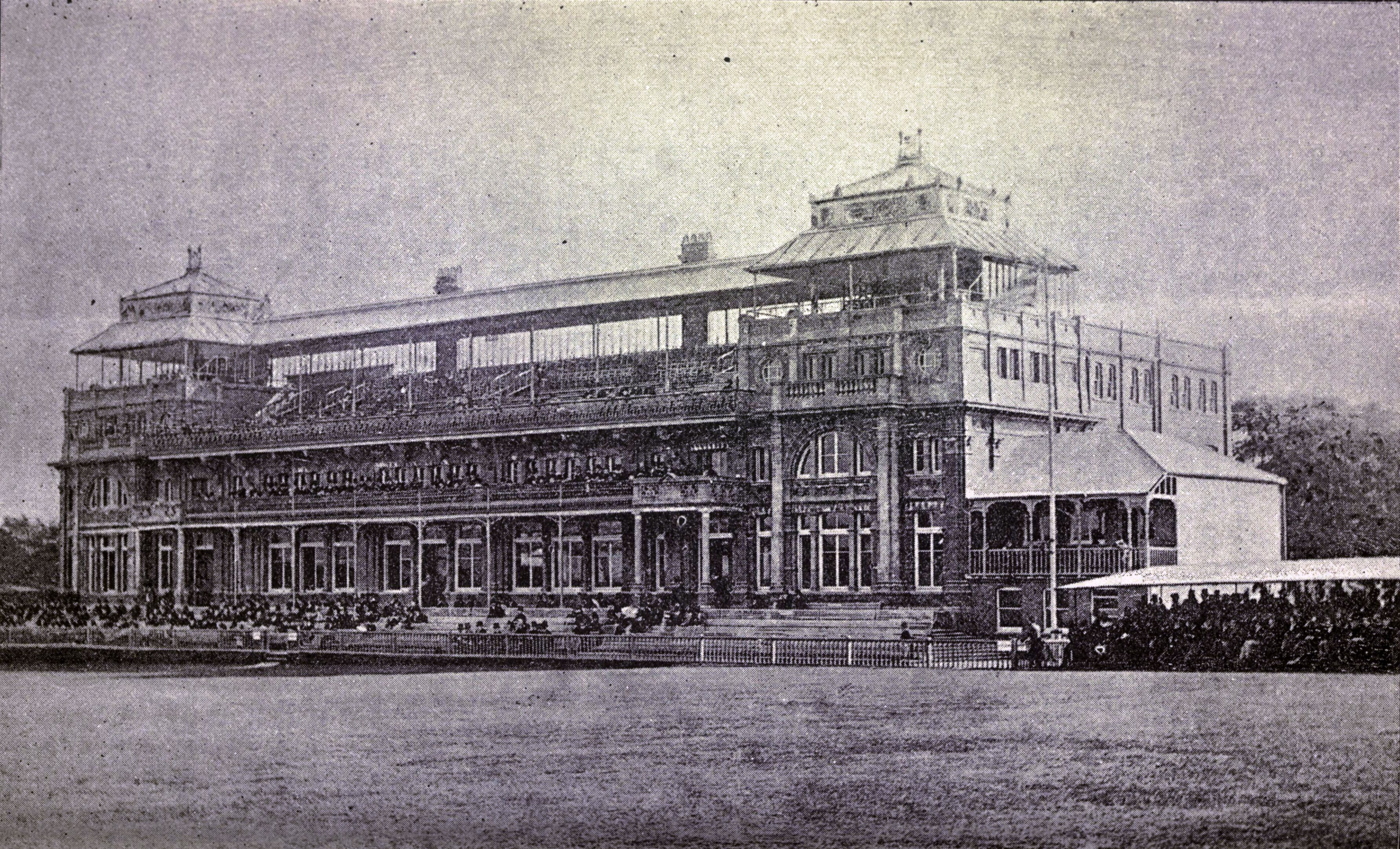
The pavilion at Lord's, finished a few months before Young's only first-class match, Kent vs. MCC in May 1890

== Legal career ==
He was called to the Bar at the Inner Temple, 15 May 1889. His colonial legal career began with an appointment (possibly as Crown Prosecutor) in the British administration of British Honduras (now Belize), where he compiled a list of the colony's laws, and made a report on the 1901 Census.

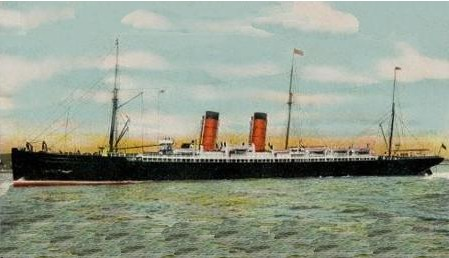
Young sailed on RMS Etruria on a voyage to Britain in 1893

In April 1893 he sailed on the RMS Etruria from New York for Liverpool (also on board was the Governor of British Honduras, Sir Alfred Moloney).

Young was appointed Crown Prosecutor in the Seychelles in 1903, where he made the decennial revision of the current list of laws of the Seychelles. He served as Attorney General of the British Central Africa Protectorate from May 1906 and Stipendiary Magistrate in Trinidad before being appointed Chief Justice of the Seychelles in 1909.

In April 1914 (just before the outbreak of World War I) he was appointed Attorney General of Fiji, which included his being made an Official Member of the Legislative Council of Fiji.

He was in Sydney in June 1920, the guest at a rugby match of the Governor of New South Wales, Sir Walter Davidson. Davidson had been Governor of the Seychelles when Young was Crown Prosecutor and Attorney General there. In November 1920 Young was appointed Chief Justice of the Leeward Islands, and in 1921 as a member of the Fijian Legislative Council. He was appointed Chief Justice of Fiji and Chief Judicial Commissioner for the Western Pacific in December 1922, and received a knighthood the following year. He was in Sydney again in April 1927.

== 1928 Royal Commission ==
In 1928 Young headed a Royal Commission to investigate whether the swimming baths in the capital, Suva, operated a 'Europeans-only' policy.

Since 1879 the colony of Fiji had imported indentured workers (as cheap labour) from India to work in the European-owned plantations, which produced (according to demand) sea island cotton from the late 1860s to the early 1870s, then copra, then sugarcane from around 1880. This Indian immigration (which ended in 1916) came about because the Pacific Islands (particularly the New Hebrides and the Solomon Islands) couldn't provide enough labour. These islands provided labour from 1864 to 1911, when the European planters in the Solomon Islands and the New Hebrides brought about legislation to prevent emigration from those islands.

The involvement of the Indian Army and India generally during the First World War had convinced the colonial Indian Government of the necessity of enfranchising all Indian citizens, and this was granted in 1917. This move towards "responsible government" included Indians living in Fiji, which replicated in some degree the political motivation and agitation which within India pushed towards the Dominion status enjoyed by Canada, Australia, New Zealand and South Africa.

Moves towards independence continued to gather pace during Young's time as Chief Justice in Fiji, where many time-served previously indentured labourers from India had stayed on to live permanently. In 1928, Indian Fijians began to complain about low numbers of enfranchised rate-payers in Suva, and about a perceived 'Europeans-only' policy of segregation in the two municipally-run public Suva swimming baths . The Governor, Sir Eyre Hutson appointed a Committee to investigate the municipal matter. The committee split into three factions which each produced a report on the situation. The disagreement between the three groups led to the Governor appointing Young to head a Royal Commission: he found that there had been a policy of segregation, which was brought to an end.

== Cricketing career ==
Alfred Young played cricket twice for Kent County Cricket Club, once in 1887 and again in 1890. The latter match, against MCC at Lord's, was his only first-class cricket appearance. He also played for Rochester Cricket Club. According to his Wisden obituary, he was "a sound, steady batsman, showing special skill in placing the ball off his legs and late cutting".

Young was an early pioneer of cricket in British Honduras, his first posting in the judiciary of the British colonial administration.

== Later life and death ==
He retired in 1929, and married Frances May Buckley (née Miller) (1875–4 October 1952) on 19 April 1930. Her parents were Sir Henry Miller (9 September 1830 – 7 February 1917) and Jessie Orbell (d. 23 July 1920). Frances was the widow (married 14 June 1899) of St. John McLean Buckley, a wealthy New Zealand sheep rancher who died in 1916.

Young was later appointed a Resident Magistrate in Cape Town, South Africa, and died there in Tamboerskloof on 5 January 1942, aged 76. A brief notice of his death appeared in the New Zealand Herald.

== Selected publications ==
- Young, Alfred Joseph Karney (1897). British Honduras: A Collection of the Ordinances in Force, 3rd July, 1897. Waterlow & Sons Limited, printers, 1897.
- Young, A. K. (1901). Report on the result of the Census of the Colony of British Honduras, taken on the 31st March, 1901. Belize: Printed at "The Angelus" Office. (The Angelus was a Belize newspaper.)
- Herchenroder, Furcy Alfred (1904). Young, A. K. (ed.). The laws of Seychelles (3 Vols. 1872–1898, revised ed.). Government Printing Office.
  [F. A. Herchenroder was the first Chief Justice of the Seychelles.]

Legal offices
Preceded by	Attorney General of British East Africa; 1906–c.1909	Succeeded by
Preceded by	Attorney General of the Seychelles; 1909-c.1914	Succeeded by
Preceded by Albert Ehrhardt	Attorney General of Fiji; 1914–1922	Succeeded by Sir Kenneth MacKenzie
Preceded by	Chief Justice of the Leeward Islands; 1920–1921	Succeeded by
Preceded by Sir Kenneth MacKenzie	Chief Judicial Commissioner for the Western Pacific; 1923–1929	Succeeded by Sir Maxwell Hendry Maxwell Anderson
Preceded by Sir Kenneth MacKenzie	Chief Justice of Fiji; 1923–1929	Succeeded by Sir Maxwell Hendry Maxwell Anderson
