= Cecilia Eliza Cowan Cameron =

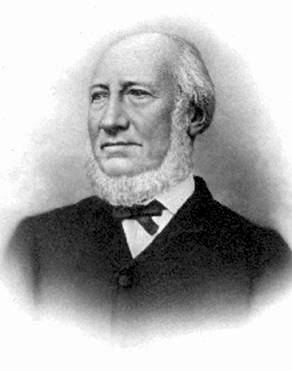
David Cameron (1804–1872), first Chief Justice of Vancouver Island; Cecilia Eliza Douglas' second husband, and Alfred Young's grandfather.

Cecilia Eliza Cowan Cameron (b. c1832 in Georgetown, British Guiana), was the daughter of a free coloured Creole, Cecilia Eliza Douglas (1812 – November 1859) and an itinerant sea captain named Cowan who left British Guiana for America. Although she went to the States to join (or search for) him, Cecilia Douglas (Young's grandmother) never found the errant sailor. (Note: "She bore a great resemblance to him—a tall stout—dignified—rather muscular (with a little fat) lady, with the West Indian manners—very polite and nice, but she differed from her brother in that she liked a joke and laughed rather pleasantly. Cameron was her second husband—the first named Cowan had gone to the States; she followed him but could not find any traces altho she travelled much through different states in difficulty and distress. No tidings came to her of him. She always spoke in the most heartfelt manner of the American people, who had been very kind and hospitable, assisted her in every possible way." J. S. Helmcken, Reminiscences, Vol III, MS. in (Victoria?) Provincial Archives; quoted from pp. 202—203 of the transcript of the original. Cited in Lamb 1953, pp. 46–7. Helmcken was a solicitor in Victoria.)

On her return to British Guiana Cecilia Douglas met and married secondly (on 4 June 1838 in Georgetown) David Cameron (1804–1872), a Scotsman from Perth who at the time was employed on a plantation (quite possibly owned by her father's Glasgow trading firm J. T. & A. Douglas and Company) in Demerara. (Note: J. T. & A. Douglas & Co. made at least two claims to the Slave Compensation Commission (1812–1851) after slavery was abolished by the Slavery Abolition Act 1833.: 1. For the loss of 132 enslaved people on their Belmont plantation in British Guiana, the amount awarded on 13 May 1837 was £3500 8s 6d. Various estimates of its value in 2014 range through £2,591,000 to £4,992,000 and up to £12,420,000.; 2. For the loss of 236 enslaved persons on their Better Hope plantation in British Guiana, the amount awarded on 30 November 1835 was £12407 13s 2d. Various estimates of its value in 2014 range through £9,185,000 to £17,700,000 and up to £44,020,000.; The trading and banking side of the British Empire was formed on such vast amounts of cash paid to ex-slave owners. These two claims alone could represent up to £56,000,000 today.) David Cameron brought his new family back to Britain in 1845, and Cecilia Douglas (now Cameron) arranged for her daughter Cecilia Cowan Cameron (Alfred Young's mother) to Cologne aged around 13–14 for her education.

Her uncle was the nepotistic James Douglas, the Governor of Colony of Vancouver Island or Vancouver Island who had arrived at what became Fort Victoria in 1843 on the Beaver. Douglas was also Chief Factor of the Hudson's Bay Company, (and later the Governor of British Columbia after its formation in 1859) and came from a tight-knit, exclusive circle of inter-related élite business families in Glasgow. He ran British Columbia and Vancouver Island as a family company, and "the interests of all...seemed hopelessly sacrificed to the company's absolute sway" (p. 271)

He paid for Cecilia Cowan to travel to Vancouver Island, and in November 1850 she began the long passage around Cape Horn aboard the Tory, to Fort Victoria, British Columbia.

Most likely at Douglas' instigation, in 1853 the governor of the Hudson's Bay Company (HBC), Andrew Colvile, offered Cameron (her step-father) the position of superintendent of the company's coal mining development at Nanaimo, Vancouver Island. Cameron accepted and arrived with his wife in July 1853 to join their daughter. Shortly after arriving in Vancouver Island in 1853, Cameron was appointed as a judge on the newly created Court of Common Pleas established by the Legislative Council of Vancouver Island. His salary of £100 was to be paid from duties on licensed ale-houses. Cameron's appointment was controversial, with opponents of the "family-company compact" noting that not only was he an HBC employee, as were most council members, but he had family ties to Douglas, and had no legal training, either.

== Family ==
Cecilia Eliza Cowan Cameron married Assistant Paymaster William A. G. Young, RN, (later Sir William Young) on 20 March 1858.; Young was soon to be appointed Colonial Secretary of British Columbia, and was later Governor of Gold Coast. He had arrived in BC as Commissioner's secretary on the joint Anglo-American Boundary Commission for New Caledonia, which – thanks to the Fraser Canyon Gold Rush – shortly became British Columbia, where he became Colonial Secretary.

They had three children:

- Sir William Douglas Young (c1859-1943), Governor of the Falkland Islands from 1915 to 1920
- Mary Alice Young (b. 1862), m. Frederick Mitchell Hodgson, later Governor of Gold Coast and Governor of British Guiana. She was a Lady of Grace of the Order of Saint John of Jerusalem, and in 1901 published a volume entitled The Siege of Kumassi, which described her experiences in Kumasi with Hodgson in that critical episode in the Ashanti War of 1900.
- Sir Alfred Karney Young (1 August 1864 – 5 January 1942), Chief Justice of Fiji and Chief Judicial Commissioner for the Western Pacific.

=== Cecilia Cowan Cameron's parents ===
Sir Alfred Young's great-grandparents:

Cecilia Eliza Douglas (1812 – Nov. 1859?) was the youngest of three known illegitimate children born to John (II) Douglas' (1772–1840) and Martha Ann Ritchie (later? Telfer) (c. 1780s-July 1839). She married David Cameron (1804–1872), first Chief Justice of Vancouver Island.

Cecilia Douglas' father, John (II) Douglas, was in partnership with two of his brothers, Thomas and Archibald, as J. T. & A. Douglas and Company, with cotton and sugar interests in Demerara and Berbice? or Esquisse?. Their father, John (I) Douglas, had married Cecilia Buchanan, whose family owned tobacco plantations in Virginia, USA. (Note: John (II) Douglas was the third of eight children born to John (I) Douglas and Cecilia Buchanan, who came from a wealthy prominent Glasgow family with a tobacco plantation in Virginia on the Potomac River adjoining that of George Washington's elder brother.(Girard 1986, pp. 4–6) Their children were: 1. William Douglas (1769 – before 1828); 2. Cecilia (I) Douglas (c1770 – 25 July 1862), inherited Orbiston Park, on the R. Calder twixt Bothwell & Hamilton. Left £40,365 in her will.; 3. John (II) Douglas (1771 or 2 – 1840) – Alfred Young's grandfather; 4. Neil (incorrectly Neill) Douglas (1773 or 4 – 1853) – Colonel or Lt-General with Scottish regiments.; 5. Thomas Dunlop Douglas (1775 – Jan 1869) – Left £300,000 in his will.; 6. Archibald Douglas (1776–1860); 7. James Douglas (? – d. before 1853?); 8. Colin Douglas (? – d. before 1828); Date information is scattered through (Girard 1986). John (II) Douglas was in partnership with two of his brothers, Thomas and Archibald, as J. T. & A. Douglas and Company, with cotton and sugar interests in Demerara and Berbice? or Esquisse?.)

John (II) Douglas looked after his firm's sugar plantations in Demerara, where he cohabited with Martha Ann Telfer (née Ritchie) (c1780s-July 1839), Cecilia Cowan Cameron's grandmother. She was a free coloured Creole born in Barbados, living in New Amsterdam, Berbice or Georgetown, Demerara, later British Guiana, now Guyana. Martha Ritchie married at some point one Richard? Telfer: her will was in the name of Mrs. M. A. Telfer.

Some twelve years before Cecilia they had two sons (Alfred Young's great-uncles) in Demerara; they were Alexander (b. c1801-2) and James Douglas (b. Demerara 1803). They grew up in Georgetown with their mother, Martha, while John Douglas returned to Scotland and married Jessie (or Janet) Hamilton of Greenock in 1809. However, he continued to consort with Martha Ritchie on another trip (by 1811) to Demerara; their daughter Cecilia Eliza Douglas (1812-Nov. 1859) (Cecilia Cowan's mother), was born in Georgetown in 1812. Douglas took his two sons (aged about 10 and 11) back to Scotland (probably by summer 1812), where they were educated in Lanark.

Like her brothers before her, Cecilia Eliza Douglas grew up in Demerara with her mother Martha Ritchie (who at some point married Richard? Telfer in Georgetown), and her grandmother, Rebecca Ritchie. Rebecca was a free coloured or mulatto Creole woman born in Barbados, who moved to New Amsterdam, Demerara with her daughter Martha in the late 1790s and owned 30 slaves. When Martha Telfer died in July 1839 she left some of her estate to her granddaughter (Alfred Young's mother), Cecilia Eliza Cowan.

=== Edith Rebecca Cameron ===
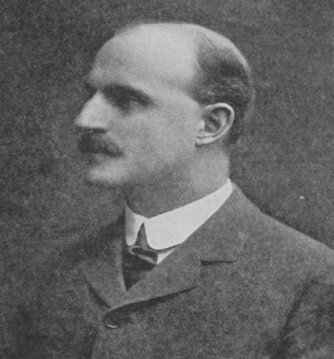
Charles Doughty-Wylie, VC, Alfred Young's cousin

Alfred Young's maternal aunt

Cecilia Eliza Douglas and David Cameron had one daughter, Edith Rebecca Cameron (Cecilia Cowan Cameron's half-sister). She married in 1860 Henry Montagu Doughty of Theberton Hall, Saxmundham, Suffolk. His brother was Charles Montagu Doughty, author of Travels in Arabia Deserta. Their parents were Rev. Charles Montagu Doughty of Theberton and Louisa Hotham, whose grandfather was the second son of Beaumont Hotham, 2nd Baron Hotham, 12th Baronet and Baron of the Exchequer for 30 years.

Edith Cameron and her husband Henry Doughty (RN) had two sons (Young's cousins). The eldest was Lt-Colonel Charles Hotham Montagu Doughty, VC, (1868–1915), a soldier and military vice-consul in Turkey. He served and fought in Europe, Africa and China, changing his name to Doughty-Wylie to incorporate his wife's maiden name. He was killed at Gallipoli on 25 April 1915 having landing at V Beach from the SS River Clyde. He rallied the troops on the beach to attack Hill 141, its dominant feature, but was killed at the moment of victory. His younger brother was Rear-Admiral Sir Henry Doughty RN (1870–1921), who commanded HMS Agincourt at the Battle of Jutland in 1916,
