= Kenneth James Muir MacKenzie =

British colonial jurist

The Honourable Kenneth James Muir MacKenzie

12th Attorney General of Fiji
- In office 1922–1927
- Monarch: George V
- Governor: Sir Cecil Hunter Rodwell; Sir Eyre Hutson
- Preceded by: Sir Alfred Young
- Succeeded by: Percy McElwaine

Acting Chief Justice of Fiji
- In office 1922–1923
- Monarch: George V
- Governor: Sir Cecil Hunter Rodwell
- Preceded by: Sir Charles Davson
- Succeeded by: Sir Alfred Young

Personal details
- Born: 1 May 1882 British India
- Died: 3 June 1931 (aged 49)
- Spouse(s): Phyllis Taylor; 24 July 1915 – 3 June 1931 (his death)
- Children: 1 son, 1 daughter (twins)
- Occupation: Soldier, Lawyer, Jurist

Military service
- Rank: Captain
- Unit: Royal Munster Fusiliers

Kenneth James Muir MacKenzie (1 May 1882 – 3 June 1931) was a British soldier, lawyer, and judge. After serving initially as Solicitor General of the East Africa Protectorate from 30 November 1919, he went on to serve as Attorney General of Fiji from 1922 to 1927. He acted in an interim capacity as Chief Justice of Fiji and Chief Judicial Commissioner for the Western Pacific from 1922 to 1923. He also served as a member of the Legislative Council of Fiji in 1927.

Muir MacKenzie served in the 5th Battalion, Royal Munster Fusiliers, attaining the rank of Captain.

== Family ==
Born in India, Muir MacKenzie was the son of Sir John William Pitt Muir MacKenzie, an administrator in British India, and Fanny Louisa Johnstone. On 24 July 1915 he married Phyllis Taylor, daughter of Henry Howard Taylor. They had twin children: Lieutenant Commander Hamish Muir MacKenzie (20 October 1917 – 18 June 1947) and Susan Muir MacKenzie (20 October 1917 – 1978).

Legal offices
Preceded by	Solicitor General of East Africa Protectorate; 1919–c.1922	Succeeded by
Preceded by Sir Alfred Karney Young	Attorney General of Fiji; 1922–1927	Succeeded by Percy McElwaine
Preceded by Sir Charles Simon Davson	Acting; Chief Judicial Commissioner for the Western Pacific; 1922–1923	Succeeded by Sir Alfred Karney Young
Preceded by Sir Charles Simon Davson	Acting; Chief Justice of Fiji; 1922–1923	Succeeded by Sir Alfred Karney Young
Political offices
Preceded by	Member of the Legislative Council of Fiji; 1927	Succeeded by
