= Owen Corrie =

British jurist

Chief Judicial Commissioner for the Western Pacific and Chief Justice of Fiji
- In office 1936–1945
- Preceded by: Maxwell Hendry Maxwell-Anderson
- Succeeded by: Claud Seaton

Personal details
- Born: 3 March 1882
- Died: 28 August 1965 (aged 83); Suffolk, England

Sir Owen Cecil Kirkpatrick Corrie MC (3 March 1882 – 28 August 1965) was a British jurist. He held the position of Chief Judicial Commissioner for the Western Pacific and Chief Justice of Fiji between 1936 and 1945. He served as a judge in Mandatory Palestine, the British-occupied zone of post-war Germany and Kenya.

== Biography ==
Owen Corrie was educated at Monkton Combe School in Somerset, and studied the Mathematical Tripos at Trinity College, Cambridge, earning a BA. He qualified as a solicitor in 1909.

Corrie served in the North Somerset Yeomanry of the British Army during World War I, during which he was in France, Belgium and Palestine. He was awarded the Military Cross and was mentioned in dispatches twice. He remained in Mandatory Palestine after the war, becoming Vice-President of the Court of Appeal in 1920. In 1921 he married Ivy Isabel. His position was later renamed Senior British Judge of the Supreme Court in 1924, and later Senior Puisne Judge. He was subsequently Acting Chief Justice on several occasions. In 1930 he was called to the bar at Gray's Inn.

In 1934 Corrie was appointed Chief Judicial Commissioner for the Western Pacific and Chief Justice of Fiji. He was made a Knight Bachelor in the 1939 Birthday Honours. After reaching the retirement age for the Colonial Judicial Service, Corrie left Fiji in June 1945 and returned to England. The following year he was appointed to serve as a Supreme Court judge in the British Zone of Germany, a role he held until 1951.

In 1953 he was appointed a puisne judge in Kenya. In 1956 he became Chairman of the Rent Controls Board in Kenya. Between 1958 and 1961 he was an Acting Judge in the East African Court of Appeal.

He subsequently lived in Bath. He died in a road traffic accident near East Bergholt in August 1965 at the age of 83.
