= Attorney-General and Minister of Justice =

Although there were attorneys-general that served the Colony of Sierra Leone, the Office of the Attorney General and Ministry of Justice that still stands today was first established in 1961. It would not combine with the Ministry of Justice until 1978 when the country's constitution was amended. The office is responsible for prosecuting all offenses in the name of the Republic of Sierra Leone. The Solicitor General and the Director of Public Prosecutions are two sub-units of the Office of Attorney General and Ministry of Justice.

== List of attorneys-general and ministers of justice (post-independence from the UK in 1961) ==
- Victor Bert Grant (c. 1957–1961)
- Berthan Macaulay (1963-1967) [1st indigenous male Attorney General]
- Abu Aiah Koroma (1967-1971)
- James Emmanuel Mahoney (1972) [Acting]
- Luseni Brewah (1972-1975)
- Solomon Pratt (1976-1977)
- Abu Kamara (1978-1982)
- Francis Minah (1983-1987)
- Abdulai Conteh (1987-1991)
- J. B. Dauda (1991-1992)
- Arnold Bishop-Gooding (1993-1994)
- Claude Campbell (1995-1996)
- Solomon Berewa (1996-2002)
- Eke Ahmed Halloway (2002-2004)
- Frederick Carew (2004-2006)
- Abdul Serry-Kamal (2007-2010)
- Frank Kargbo (2010-2015)
- Joseph Fitzgerald Kamara (2016-2018)
- Charles Margai (2018)
- Priscilla Schwartz (2018-2020) [1st female]
- Anthony Yiehwoe Brewah (2020–present)

== See also ==
- Justice ministry
- Politics of Sierra Leone
