= Cecil Carey =

Cecil Carey may refer to:

- Cec Carey (1907–1969), member of the Queensland Legislative Assembly
- Cecil William Victor Carey (1887–1976), Irish barrister and colonial judge
