= James Beveridge Thomson =

Scottish barrister

Yang Amat Berbahagia Tun Sir James Beveridge Thomson SMN(K) PMN(K) Kt KBE
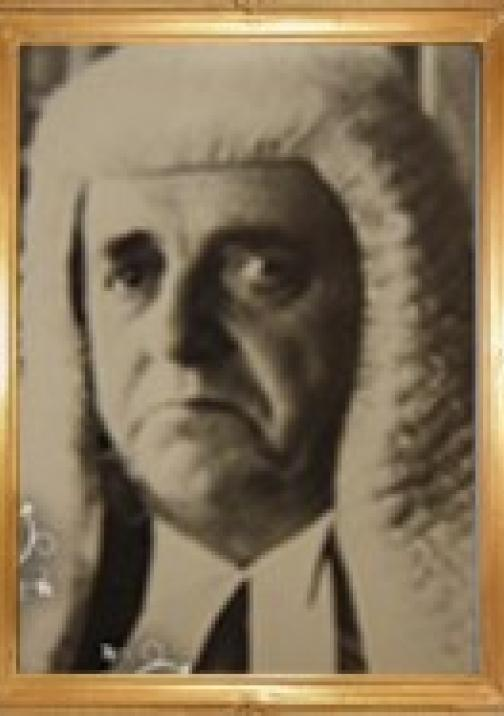

1st Lord President of the Federal Court
- In office 16 September 1963 – 31 May 1966
- Preceded by: himself (as Chief Justice of the Federation of Malaya)
- Succeeded by: Syed Sheh Hassan Barakbah

Chief Justice of the Federation of Malaya
- In office 31 August 1957 – 16 September 1963
- Preceded by: Post created
- Succeeded by: himself (as Lord President of the Federal Court)

Chief Justice of Fiji and Chief Judicial Commissioner for the Western Pacific
- In office 1949–1953
- Preceded by: Claud Seton
- Succeeded by: Ragnar Hyne

Chief Justice of Tonga
- In office 1949–1953
- Succeeded by: William Desmond Care

Personal details
- Born: 24 March 1902 Clydebank, Scotland
- Died: 31 March 1983 (aged 81)
- Spouse(s): Toh Puan Florence Adams, Lady Thomson

Sir James Beveridge Thomson (24 March 1902 – 31 March 1983), was a Scottish barrister who was the Chief Justice of the Federal Court of Malaysia. He was also Chief Justice of Fiji.

== Life ==
Born in Clydebank, Scotland, he attended George Watson's College and graduated from the University of Edinburgh with first class honours in history.

He was called to the English Bar (Middle Temple) in 1929. He was a resident magistrate in Northern Rhodesia, appointed Puisne Judge, Fiji and Western Pacific, in 1945, and Puisne Judge in Malaya in 1947. He was Chief Justice of Fiji (and ex officio Chief Judicial Commissioner for the Western Pacific) 1949–1953, and Chief Justice of Tonga. He was called to the Scottish Bar in 1955.

From 1953, Thomson was back in Malaya, serving as a judge in the High Court in Ipoh, Perak, from 1953 to 1957. In 1957, he was appointed Chief Justice of Malaya, receiving a knighthood in 1959. After the formation of Malaysia in September 1963, Thomson served as its first Lord President of the Federal Court until May 1966. (Note: The Federal Court was known as the Supreme Court between 1985-1994.) He was appointed a KBE in 1966.

== Family life ==
He married Dr Florence Adams, MRCP (Eng.), LRCP (Lond.). After Sir James Thomson's knighthood in 1959, she was known as Toh Puan Datin Lady Florence Adams Thomson. She was a practising physician, working in Northern Rhodesia, where her husband was Resident Magistrate, and was Medical Officer in Fiji. During their time in Malaysia, she became chief nutritionist at the Institute of Medical Research in Kuala Lumpur, carrying out research and authoring a number of articles on child nutrition in Malaysia. When in Scotland, and after their retirement, they lived at Craig Gowan, Carrbridge, Badenoch and Strathspey, Highland region (formerly Inverness-shire).

== Honours ==
=== Commonwealth honours ===
- Malaysia :
  - Honorary Grand Commander of the Order of the Defender of the Realm (SMN (K)) – Tun (1966)
- Malaya :
  - Honorary Commander of the Order of the Defender of the Realm (PMN (K)) – Tan Sri (1958)
- United Kingdom :
  - Knight Commander of the Order of the British Empire (KBE) – Sir (1966)
  - Knight Bachelor (Kt) – Sir (1959)

== Selected bibliography ==
- Thomson, James Beveridge (1950). The laws of the British Solomon Islands Protectorate : containing the King's regulations and subsidiary legislation thereunder enacted on or before the 1st day of January, 1948 (2 Vols.). British Solomon Islands: A. J. Elphick, Acting Government Printer.
- Thomson, James Beveridge (1951). Electoral Act, revised edition of the laws of Tonga comprising all laws, acts, and ordinances in force on the first day of January 1948. Dunedin, New Zealand: Coulls Somerville Willie.

== Notes ==
Preceded by Post created	Lord President of the Federal Court; 1963–1966	Succeeded by Syed Sheh Hassan Barakbah
