= Attorney General Kamal =

Attorney General Kamal may refer to:

- Fida M. Kamal (fl. 2000s), Attorney General of Bangladesh
- Mustafa Kamal (judge) (1933–2015), Attorney General of Bangladesh

== See also ==
- Abdul Serry-Kamal (1954–2014), Attorney General of Sierra Leone
