= Charles Henry Major =

British judge

Sir Charles Henry Major

Attorney General of Grenada
- In office 1901–1902
- Monarch: Edward VII
- Preceded by: Leslie Probyn

5th Chief Judicial Commissioner for the Western Pacific
- In office 1902–1914
- Monarchs: Edward VII; George V
- Preceded by: Sir Henry Berkeley
- Succeeded by: Albert Ehrhardt (acting)

8th Chief Justice of Fiji
- In office 1902–1914
- Monarchs: Edward VII; George V
- Preceded by: Sir Henry Berkeley
- Succeeded by: Albert Ehrhardt (acting)

Acting High Commissioner for the Western Pacific
- In office 1910 – 21 February 1911
- Monarch: Edward VII
- Preceded by: Sir Everard im Thurn
- Succeeded by: Sir Francis May

Acting Governor of Fiji
- In office 1910 – 21 February 1911
- Monarch: Edward VII
- Preceded by: Sir Everard im Thurn
- Succeeded by: Sir Francis May

Chief Justice of British Guiana
- In office 1914 – 31 August 1933
- Monarch: George V

Personal details
- Born: 30 October 1860 St Kitts
- Died: 31 August 1933 (aged 72)
- Spouse(s): Sarah Waterman Branch m. 21 December 1893
- Education: Middle Temple

Sir Charles Henry Major (30 October 1860 – 31 August 1933) was a British judge, who served in various colonies around the Caribbean, as well as in Fiji.

== Biography ==
Born in St Kitts, Major was the son of Charles Henry Major Sr., manager of the Colonial Bank of the West Indies, and Francis Frederica Clinckett, of Barbados. He was called to the bar at the Middle Temple, and practised Law in the Leeward Islands from 1887.

He was Chancellor of the Diocese of Antigua from 1889 to 1899, a member of the Legislative Council of Antigua from 1895 to 1899, and a member and President of the General Legislative Council of the Leeward Islands from 1896 to 1900. He served as a member of the Federal Executive Council of the Leeward Islands from 1897 to 1901, as Vice-President of the Legislative Council of Antigua from 1897 to 1899, and Attorney General of Grenada from 1901 to 1902, when he transferred to Fiji.

He was appointed Chief Judicial Commissioner for the Western Pacific and Chief Justice of Fiji in September 1902, serving as such until 1914, then as Chief Justice of British Guiana from 1914 till his death in 1933. During his term as Chief Justice of Fiji, he was ex officio a member of the Legislative Council, and acted as Governor of Fiji in an interim capacity from 1910 to 21 February 1911.

He was given a knighthood in 1911 while serving as Chief Justice of Fiji.

Government offices
Preceded by Leslie Probyn	Attorney General of Grenada; 1901–1902	Succeeded by
Preceded by Sir Everard im Thurn	Acting; High Commissioner for the Western Pacific; 1910–1911	Succeeded by Sir Francis May
Preceded by Sir Everard im Thurn	Acting; Governor of Fiji; 1910–1911	Succeeded by Sir Francis May
Preceded by Sir Henry Berkeley	Acting; Chief Judicial Commissioner for the Western Pacific; 1902–1914	Succeeded by Albert Ehrnhardt; Acting
Preceded by Sir Henry Berkeley	Chief Justice of Fiji; 1902–1914	Succeeded by Albert Ehrnhardt; Acting
Preceded by Henry Alleyn Bovell	Chief Justice of British Guiana; 1914–1933	Succeeded by Anthony de Freitas
