= Salesi Temo =

Chief Justice of Fiji since 2024

Chief Justice of Fiji
- Incumbent
- Assumed office 24 December 2024
- Preceded by: Kamal Kumar

Salesi Temo is a Fijian jurist. In January 2023, he was appointed acting Chief Justice of Fiji.

He was appointed Chief Justice of Fiji by President Naiqama Lalabalavu upon the advice of Prime Minister Sitiveni Rabuka on 24 December 2024.

Temo worked as a magistrate, and played a prominent role in prosecutions following the 2000 Fijian coup d'état. He continued in office after the 2006 Fijian coup d'état, and accepted reappointment following the military regime's abrogation of the 1997 Constitution of Fiji during the 2009 Fijian constitutional crisis. In June 2009 he was appointed to the High Court of Fiji as an acting Puisne judge by the military regime.

In September 2011, he criticised the New Zealand government for refusing to cooperate with Fiji's military regime or extradite people wanted for political offences by the dictatorship.

On 30 January 2023, he was appointed acting chief justice following the suspension of Kamal Kumar for misbehaviour.

== Honours ==
In October 2020, he was awarded the 50th Anniversary of Independence Medal for his services to the judiciary.
