= Kamal Kumar =

Chief Justice of Fiji from 2019 to 2023

- कमल कुमार (Fiji Hindi)

Chief Justice of Fiji
- In office 8 April 2019 – 30 January 2023
- Preceded by: Anthony Gates
- Succeeded by: Salesi Temo

Personal details
- Born: 13 December 1963
- Died: 21 November 2023
- Education: Queensland University of Technology

Kamal Kumar (died 21 November 2023) was a Fijian jurist who served as Chief Justice of Fiji from 2019 to 2023.

Kumar was educated at the Queensland University of Technology in Australia, graduating with a Bachelor of Law (LL.B.). He worked as a lawyer in Australia, and then in Fiji, before being appointed to the High Court of Fiji civil division in 2013.

From September 2018, he served as the head of the Fiji Human Rights and Anti-Discrimination Commission, and he served as a president of Dakshina India Andhra Sangam Fiji of Lautoka Branch for two consecutive terms until 2012. He was appointed acting chief justice following the retirement of Anthony Gates in April 2019. The position was made permanent and he was formally sworn in as chief justice on 6 August 2021.

On 30 January 2023, Kumar was suspended by President Wiliame Katonivere after allegations of misbehaviour. Salesi Temo was appointed to act in his place. He died on 21 November 2023.
