= Robert Wilson Hamilton =

American judge

The Honourable Robert Wilson Hamilton

1st Attorney General of Fiji
- In office 1872–1872
- Monarch: Seru Epenisa Cakobau
- Succeeded by: Charles Rossiter Forwood

Personal details
- Born: 1819
- Died: 9 August 1904 (aged 84–85) Poughkeepsie, New York
- Citizenship: United States
- Spouse(s): Isabella Eliza Hart (m. 1 October 1858)
- Children: 1 son
- Profession: Lawyer, Jurist

Robert Wilson Hamilton (1819 – 9 August 1904) was an American-born lawyer and judge who was the inaugural Attorney General of Fiji. He served on the courts of the state of Illinois and later practiced law in California. During a business trip to Fiji in 1872, King Seru Epenisa Cakobau persuaded him to remain and take up the newly created position of Attorney General. He served until Charles Rossiter Forwood replaced him later that year.

Hamilton married Isabella Eliza Hart at Lapeer, Michigan, on 1 October 1858. They had one son, Alvin Nelson, born 14 October 1859. Hamilton died in Poughkeepsie, New York.

Legal offices
Preceded by None (Office created)	Attorney-General of Fiji; 1872	Succeeded by Charles Rossiter Forwood
