= Solicitor general =

Legal position in common law countries

A solicitor general is a government official who serves as the chief representative of the government in courtroom proceedings. In systems based on the English common law that have an attorney general or equivalent position, the solicitor general is often the second-ranked law officer of the state and a deputy of the attorney general. The extent to which a solicitor general actually provides legal advice to or represents the government in court varies from jurisdiction to jurisdiction, and sometimes varies between individual office holders in the same jurisdiction.

== List ==
Solicitors General include the following:

=== Australia ===
- In Australia the role of the Solicitor-General is as the second law officer after the Attorney-General. At federal level, the position of Solicitor-General of Australia was created in 1916 and until 1964 was held by the secretary of the Attorney-General's Department. It has always been held by a public servant. At state (and prior to 1901, colonial) level, the position has existed since the granting of self-government in the 19th century, and until the early 20th century was held by a member of parliament. During the 20th century there have been significant changes to the role, becoming increasingly independent and non-political to balance the increasing political engagement of the Attorney-General. Criminal litigation has largely been devolved to the various Directors of Public Prosecution. The Solicitor-General provides legal advice to the executive and represents the relevant government in court proceedings, particularly in constitutional matters.
  - Solicitor-General of Australia
  - Solicitor-General of the Australian Capital Territory
  - Solicitor General for New South Wales
  - Solicitor-General of the Northern Territory
  - Solicitor-General of Queensland
  - Solicitor-General of South Australia
  - Solicitor-General of Tasmania
  - Solicitor-General of Victoria
  - Solicitor-General of Western Australia

=== Canada ===
The role of Solicitor General existed at both the federal and provincial levels throughout the 19th and 20th centuries. However, within recent decades it has been renamed or merged into another ministry in most jurisdictions.

- Solicitor General of Canada, a role now performed by the Minister of Public Safety

Provincial and territorial roles:

- Solicitor General of Ontario, responsible for police and other law enforcement agencies in the province of Ontario. From 2003 to 2019 it was known as the Minister of Community Safety and Correctional Services. At various points there was a separate Minister of Correctional Services
- Solicitor General of Quebec, a role now performed by the Minister of Public Security
- Solicitor General of Nova Scotia, a role now performed by the Minister of Justice
- Solicitor General of New Brunswick, a role now performed by the Minister of Public Safety
- Solicitor General of Newfoundland and Labrador
- Minister of Public Safety and Solicitor General of British Columbia
- Solicitor General of Prince Edward Island
- Solicitor General of Alberta, a role now performed by the Minister of Justice
- Solicitor General of Saskatchewan
- Solicitor General of the Northwest Territories

=== United Kingdom ===
- In the United Kingdom:
  - Solicitor General for England and Wales, the deputy for the Attorney General for England and Wales
  - Solicitor General for Scotland, the deputy of the Lord Advocate of Scotland
  - Solicitor General to the Duchy of Cornwall, one of two royal duchies in England, the other being the Duchy of Lancaster

=== United States ===
- Solicitor General of the United States, the federal government's primary advocate before the U.S. Supreme Court
- In U.S. state governments, the Solicitor General is usually a high-level legal official who argues in court — often in the U.S. Supreme Court or in the federal United States courts of appeals — on behalf of the State, its executives and officials, and its legislature. The position of state solicitor general appeared in the late 20th century, and not all states have a solicitor general. State Solicitors General include, among others
  - Solicitor General of Alabama, the top appellate advocate in the State of Alabama.
  - Solicitor General of Florida, the top appellate advocate for the State of Florida
  - Solicitor General of Hawaii, the top appellate advocate in the State of Hawaii
  - Solicitor General of Kentucky, the top appellate advocate in the Commonwealth of Kentucky.
  - Solicitor General of Louisiana, the top appellate advocate in the State of Louisiana
  - Solicitor General of Michigan, the top appellate advocate for the State of Michigan
  - Solicitor General of Missouri, the top appellate advocate for the State of Missouri.
  - Solicitor General of New Jersey, the top appellate advocate in the State of New Jersey
  - Solicitor General of New York, the top appellate advocate in the State of New York
  - Solicitor General of Ohio, the top appellate advocate in the State of Ohio
  - Solicitor General of Texas, the top appellate advocate in the State of Texas
  - Solicitor General of Vermont, the top appellate advocate in the State of Vermont
  - Solicitor General of Washington, the top appellate advocate in the State of Washington.
  - Solicitor General of West Virginia, the top appellate advocate in the State of West Virginia.
  - Though not a state, the District of Columbia also has an Office of the Solicitor General.
- Georgia also has county solicitors general who prosecute misdemeanors in that county.

=== Other countries ===
- In the British West Indies:
  - Solicitor General of Leeward Islands
  - Solicitor General of Barbados
  - Solicitor-General of Belize, a law officer of the government of Belize, subordinate to the Attorney-General of Belize
  - Solicitor General of Grenada
- Solicitor-General (Fiji), the chief executive officer of the Attorney-General's Chambers, and as such assists the Attorney-General in advising the government on legal matters, and in performing legal work for the government
- Solicitor General of Hong Kong, until 1979, deputy to the Attorney-General; since 1981, head of the Legal Policy Division of the Department of Justice (Chinese: 律政司) in Hong Kong
- Solicitor General of India, Attorney General of India
- Solicitor-General for Ireland, deputy to the Attorney-General for Ireland, until 1922
- Solicitor-General of New Zealand, the second law officer of state and public servant representing the Attorney-General in court proceedings
- Solicitor-General of the Philippines
- Solicitor General of Sri Lanka, the deputy for the Attorney General for Sri Lanka
- Solicitor-General of Singapore, formerly the deputy of the Attorney-General of Singapore, now subordinate to the Deputy Attorney-General of Singapore.

== See also ==
- Attorney general, the main legal advisor to the government. In some jurisdictions the attorney general may also have executive responsibility for law enforcement or responsibility for public prosecutions
- Justice of the peace, sometimes used with the same meaning
- Law officers of the Crown, the chief legal advisers to the Crown, and advise and represent the various governments in the United Kingdom and the other Commonwealth Realms
- Solicitor, a lawyer who traditionally deals with any legal matter including conducting proceedings in court
- Solicitor (South Carolina), a state elected position equivalent to a district attorney in many other states
