= German International School Cape Town =

Coordinates: 33.9296°S 18.3991°E

- Deutsche Internationale Schule Kapstadt

Location
- * Main: 28 Bay View Avenue, Tamboerskloof, 8001, Cape Town: Parow: Parow North Sport and Recreation Centre, De Grendel Road, Parow

Information
- Established: 1883
- Website: dsk.co.za

The German International School Cape Town (German: Deutsche Internationale Schule Kapstadt, DSK) is a German international school in Cape Town, South Africa. The school has English and German streams, available for primary school, middle school, and high school. The German stream is available for grades 1–12 while the English stream is available for grades 5–12.

The main campus is in Tamboerskloof while it has a satellite campus (Zweigstelle Parow) in Parow. The Parow campus, in the Tygerberg area, serves German-speaking students until grade 4.

== History ==
In 1875, the purchase of a plot of land for the construction of a school by the St. Martini parish in Cape Town took place and eight years later, the German St. Martini School was founded in 1883. Even before the First World War, the German government began to provide financial aid. After the defeat in the war and the loss of the German colonies, the German School Association Cape Town became the sponsor of the school in 1930.

In 1961 the name was changed to Deutsche Schule Kapstadt (DSK). Then the move into the new building, largely financed by the Federal Republic of Germany, began. In 1964, the first students successfully passed their matriculation examinations (South African school-leaving certificate "Senior Certificate" after grade 12) at the DSK. In 1978, the Arthur Painczyk Sports Field was inaugurated; in 1981, the DSK opened its doors to pupils of all demographic groups. The 1983 opening of the new swimming pool coincided with the 100th anniversary celebration. In 1984, the construction of the science classrooms began, and in 1987, the English stream was created.

The first Abitur examination at the DSK took place in 1989. In 1992, the Olympics of the German Schools in Southern Africa took place at the DSK for the first time. Two years later, construction of a new boarding house began. Strengthened economic ties and the influx of more Germans led to the opening of the second primary school in Bellville in 1995 and the opening of the Gisela Lange Music Hall as well as the renovated Konrad Taeuber Hall in 1997. In 1998, the primary school began moving from Bellville to Parow. In 2003, a second computer room was inaugurated at the DSK; since 2008, computers have been used in almost all classrooms in conjunction with video projectors and interactive whiteboards.

In 2013, an additional building was opened which contains, among other things, the library, an amphitheater, a multi-function room and several classrooms. The most recent edition to the campus is the new sports hall which was constructed in 2019. In 2023 the School finished construction of a Science Center.

== Structure of the School ==
As is customary in South Africa, the school year begins around 20 January. In terms of structure, the DSK corresponds to a comprehensive school, with the matric being achieved after 12 years and the Abitur, since 2009, also after 12 years. The model corresponds roughly to that of a Gesamtschule. Attempts are made to ensure a level of teaching that corresponds to the German standard. New entrants to the school within the framework of the New Secondary School (integration programme for non-German-speaking pupils from the Cape Town area from grade five) are required to pass aptitude tests in mathematics and English.

67 per cent of the pupils come from South Africa, 33 per cent from German-speaking countries.

== Transport ==
The DSK provides bus services from Table View, Hout Bay, Tokai and Tyger Valley to the main campus in Tamboerskloof.
