= Henry Spencer Berkeley =

British judge

The Honourable Sir Henry Spencer Berkeley
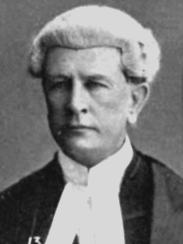
- Sir Henry Berkeley KC, Chief Justice of Fiji and Attorney General of Hong Kong

7th Attorney General of Fiji
- In office 1886–1889
- Monarch: Victoria
- Governor: Sir John Thurston (acting); Sir Charles Mitchell; Sir John Thurston
- Preceded by: Sir Fielding Clarke
- Succeeded by: John Udal

Acting Attorney General of the Leeward Islands
- In office 1877–1878
- Monarch: Victoria
- Governor: George Berkeley

4th Chief Judicial Commissioner for the Western Pacific
- In office 1889–1902
- Monarchs: Victoria; Edward VII
- Chief Judicial Commissioner2: Sir John Thurston; Sir George T. M. O'Brien; Sir William Allardyce (acting)
- Preceded by: Sir Fielding Clarke
- Succeeded by: Sir Charles Henry Major

6th Chief Justice of Fiji
- In office 1889–1902
- Monarchs: Victoria; Edward VII
- Governor: Sir John Bates Thurston; Sir George T. M. O'Brien; Sir William Allardyce (acting)
- Preceded by: Sir Fielding Clarke
- Succeeded by: Sir Charles Henry Major

10th Attorney General of Hong Kong
- In office 1902–1906
- Monarch: Edward VII
- Governor: Sir Henry Arthur Blake
- Preceded by: Sir W. Meigh Goodman
- Succeeded by: Sir William Rees-Davies

Personal details
- Born: 6 September 1851 St Kitts
- Died: 30 September 1918 (aged 67)
- Spouse(s): Katherine Cassin m. 1878
- Children: 2 daughters, 1 son
- Profession: Lawyer

Sir Henry Spencer Hardtman Berkeley (6 September 1851 – 30 September 1918), was a barrister, Attorney General and Chief Justice of Fiji and Attorney-General of Hong Kong.

== Early life ==
Berkeley was the third son of Thomas Berkeley Hardtman Berkeley and Alice Hart Rawlins, of St. Kitts.

He was educated for the legal profession and called to the bar at the Inner Temple in June 1873.

In 1878, Berkeley married Katherine Cassin, daughter of F. S. Cassin of Antigua in the West Indies. They had three children: Katharine Margaret, Marjorie, and Maurice Anthony.

== Leeward Islands ==
Berkeley was admitted to the bar of the Leeward Islands in July 1874. He filled various legal and official posts in the Leeward Islands. After acting as Attorney General in an interim capacity (1877–1878), he became Solicitor General from 1878 to 1883, when he became Acting Colonial Secretary.

== Fiji ==
In 1885, he was appointed Attorney General of Fiji in succession to Fielding Clarke who was appointed Chief Justice of Fiji and Chief Judicial Commissioner for the Western Pacific. As Attorney-General he acted as Chief Justice when Clarke was on leave. In 1889, he succeeded Clarke in both roles. He acted for a brief time as Governor of Fiji.

Berkeley was knighted in the Queen's Birthday Honours of 20 May 1896.

== Hong Kong ==
In what was seen as a slightly strange move from the bench back to the bar, in 1902, Berkeley accepted the position of Attorney-General for Hong Kong. In 1904 he was considered for the position of Chief Justice of Hong Kong on the retirement of W. Meigh Goodman. Francis Piggott was appointed instead. Berkeley acted as Chief Justice of Hong Kong on two occasions.

He was appointed a King's Counsel in Hong Kong in 1906. He resigned as Attorney General in 1906 to enter full-time private practice. William Rees-Davies took over the role in 1907. Berkeley continued to practice in Hong Kong until 1912. After retirement as attorney general, he continued to serve on the Hong Kong Legislative Council which he had been a member of as Attorney General. He also acted as Attorney General in 1909.

Berkeley also served as Chairman of the Hong Kong Volunteer Reserve Association, which consisted of men over 35 years of age. The VRA's principal aim was the encouragement of rifle shooting.

== Later life ==
After returning to England, he was a member of the West Sussex County Council from 1913.

Berkeley died on 30 September 1918 in England.

Legal offices
Preceded by Robert French Sheriff	Attorney General of the Leeward Islands; Acting; 1877–1878	Succeeded by Henry James Burford Hancock
Preceded by Sir Fielding Clarke	Attorney General of Fiji; 1886–1889	Succeeded by John Udal
Preceded by Sir Fielding Clarke	Chief Judicial Commissioner for the Western Pacific; 1889–1902	Succeeded by Sir Charles Henry Major
Preceded by Sir Fielding Clarke	Chief Justice of Fiji; 1889–1902	Succeeded by Sir Charles Henry Major
Preceded by Sir W. Meigh Goodman	Attorney General of Hong Kong; 1902–1906	Succeeded by Sir William Rees-Davies
Political offices
Preceded by Henry Keswick	Unofficial Member; Legislative Council of Hong Kong; 1908	Succeeded by Henry Keswick
