= Charles Rossiter Forwood =

Australian lawyer

The Honourable Charles Rossiter Forwood

Acting Chief Justice of Fiji
- In office 1872–1872
- Monarch: Seru Epenisa Cakobau
- Succeeded by: Sir Charles St Julian

2nd Attorney General of Fiji
- In office 1872–1873
- Monarch: Seru Epenisa Cakobau
- Preceded by: Robert Wilson Hamilton
- Succeeded by: Sydney Burt

Personal details
- Born: 12 October 1827 Tiverton, Devon, England
- Died: 2 February 1890 (aged 62) Melbourne, Victoria, Australia
- Resting place: St Kilda Cemetery
- Spouse(s): Esther De Young; 17 June 1849 – September 1857 (her death); Prudence Winch De La Fontaine; 21 August 1861 – 13 July 1888 (her death)
- Children: 6 sons, 3 daughters
- Profession: Lawyer

Charles Rossiter Forwood (12 October 1827 – 2 February 1890) was an English-born Australian lawyer and Attorney General of Fiji from 1872 to 1873.

== Early life ==
Forwood was born on in Tiverton, Devon, the sixth child of Capt Thomas Forwood and Mary Ann Rossiter, of Warncombe House, Newte's Hill Road, Tiverton, Devon. He enrolled at Blundell's School, Tiverton on 15 August 1835 aged 8 years and completed his studies on 14 September 1837.

After leaving school he was employed in a Manchester Warehouse and in 1840 he started employment with Charles Robert Colman Esq., Ship Owner and Wharfinger in London, where he lived with his step aunt from his grandfather, Thomas Rossiter's second marriage.

On 17 June 1849, at the age of 23, he married Esther De Young in Lambeth, Surrey. Esther was the daughter of John De Young, a Spanish Merchant from Gibraltar, and Ann Harris (of Irish ancestry) from Lisbon, Portugal. They had five children, Catherine Esther (b:1850) Charles Henry (b:1852) William Phillip (b:1854) Walter Weech (b:1855) and Marian Nancy (b:1857).

== Migration to Australia ==
In late 1853, the Forwoods, accompanied by their first two children, Catherine Ester (b:1850) and Charles Henry (b:1852), left Portsmouth, England bound for Australia. They arrived in Melbourne, Victoria on Christmas Eve 1853 and were met by Charles’s mother Mary Ann Forwood, his brother William Henry and sister Emma Catherine who had completed the voyage earlier in the same year.

Forwood established a law practice in Melbourne on his arrival in 1853 and became a successful barrister of Law. During this time the family lived at Nerrena (renamed Kinnoull) Sorrett Avenue, Malvern.

In September, 1857 his wife Esther died and was buried on 15 September 1857 in St Kilda Cemetery. Eighteen months later, aged 36, on 21 August 1861 he married Prudence Winch De La Fontaine in Melbourne. They had four children, Frank Owen (b:1862) Edward William (b:1864) Florence De La Fontaine (b:1865) Alfred Ernest Albert (b:1867).

In mid-1871, aged 45, Forwood was elected to the board of the Polynesia Company and sailed to Suva, Fiji aboard the SS Baclutha on 4 October 1871. He arrived in Suva, Fiji on 18 October 1871. Whilst in Fiji he served as a Supreme Court judge and filled in as Chief Justice of Fiji in an interim capacity in early 1872, pending the appointment of Sir Charles St Julian as the first substantive Chief Justice. He was subsequently appointed Attorney General to Fiji in 1872, a position he served in for two years. He spent a number of years in Wellington, New Zealand where he practiced law.

In 1888 Forwood returned to Melbourne, via Sydney where he was in poor health. On 31 July 1888, Prudence Winch died and was buried in St Kilda Cemetery. It was during a protracted illness in 1889 that Rossiter wrote his autobiography An account of an English Country family since 1700 which he completed in Melbourne on 31 July 1889, plus a subsequent addition to the original An account of the Settlement of Fiji, completed on 31 October 1889.

Forwood died in Toorak, Melbourne, at the age of 62 years. He was buried at St Kilda Cemetery beside his first and second wives Esther and Prudence, his mother Mary Ann Forwood and three of his children, Alice, Ellen Marion and Florence M.

Legal offices
Preceded by None (Office created)	Acting; Chief Justice of Fiji; 1872	Succeeded by Sir Charles St Julian
Preceded by Robert Wilson Hamilton	Attorney-General of Fiji; 1872-1874	Succeeded by Sydney Burt
