= Henry Wrenfordsley =

Chief justice of Western Australia (1825–1908)

Sir Henry Thomas Wrenfordsley (1825 – 2 June 1908) was an Irish lawyer and was the second Chief Justice of the Supreme Court of Western Australia, which is the highest ranking court in the Australian State of Western Australia.

== Early life ==
Wrenfordsley was born in Middlesex, England, the son of Joseph Wrenfordsley (also known as Wrendfordsley, Wransfordsley and Wrenford Sly), an Irish solicitor, and his wife Louisa, née Bywater. Educated privately in France, he entered Trinity College, Dublin (as Henry Wransfordsly) in March 1841 but did not obtain a degree. Wrenfordsley qualified as a solicitor, became a journeyman lawyer in Dublin and at the English Bar, called to the bar on 30 April 1863, he was junior counsel for the Privy Council office in House of Commons inquiries into the foreign cattle market. In 1876 Wrenfordsley became a deputy-judge of County courts at Marylebone, Brompton and Brentford.

== Career ==
Wrenfordsley later joined the colonial service and was appointed as a puisne judge at Mauritius in 1877. Wrenfordsley was then appointed Attorney General of Jamaica, then on the death of Sir Archibald Burt in 1879, was made chief justice of Western Australia. He arrived there in the Bangalore on 5 March 1880 accompanied by a lady, probably his sister.

Contemporary accounts suggest Wrenfordsley was given to frequent clashes of personality. One such clash with the Chief Secretary, Lord Gifford, in which he was supported by the Governor, Sir William Robinson led to Sir Henry's removal to the post of Chief Justice of Fiji. This ended a tumultuous three years for the state, although Sir Henry would return once more in 1890 as acting Chief Justice when his successor, Sir Alexander Onslow took a one-year leave of absence.

Wrenfordsley was acting governor of Western Australia from February to June 1883 when he was knighted. From March 1885 to February 1887 Wrenfordsley was an acting judge of the supreme court of Tasmania, and took a similar position at Melbourne in 1888. In 1891 he was appointed temporary acting chief justice at Perth. Later in 1891 Wrenfordsley became Chief Justice of the Leeward Islands, and held the position until he retired in 1901 when he went to live in the south of France. Wrenfordsley died at Antibes, France on 2 June 1908.

== See also ==
- Judiciary of Australia

Legal offices
Preceded by Sir Archibald Burt	Chief Justice of Western Australia; 1880–1883	Succeeded by Sir Alexander Onslow
Preceded by Sir John Gorrie	Chief Justice of Fiji; 1883–1885	Succeeded by Sir Fielding Clarke
