= Charles St Julian =

Australian journalist and Chief Justice of Fiji

The Honourable Sir Charles St Julian
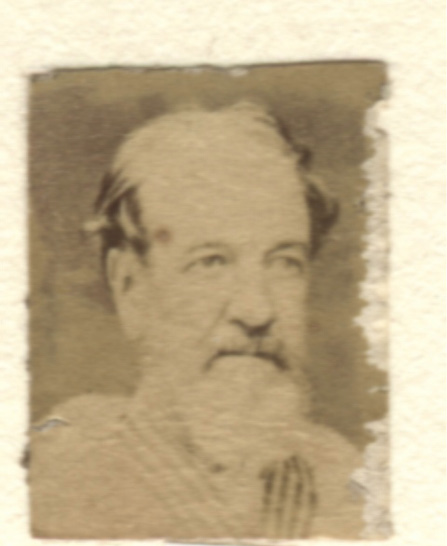

1st Chief Justice of Fiji
- In office 1872 – 27 August 1874
- Monarch: Seru Epenisa Cakobau
- Preceded by: Charles Rossiter Forwood (acting)
- Succeeded by: Sir William Hackett

Personal details
- Born: Charles Trout; 10 May 1819 France
- Died: 26 November 1874 (aged 55) Nairu kuni, near Levuka, Fiji
- Resting place: Nautolu Cemetery, Ovalau
- Citizenship: British
- Spouse(s): 1. Eleanor Heffernan; (26 November 1839 — 28 August 1861, her death); 2. Eliza Winifred Hawkesley (10 January 1863 — 26 November 1874, his death)
- Profession: Journalist, editor

Charles James Herbert de Courcy St Julian (10 May 1819 – 26 November 1874) was a journalist, newspaper owner-editor and the first Chief Justice of Fiji.

St Julian's obituary records that he was born in France but other sources suggest London in 1818. He claimed to be the son of Thomas St Julian, French army officer, and his wife Marian, née Blackwell. However, the Australian academic, Marion Diamond, in her biography of St Julian, claims that he deliberately obscured his origins and that it is likely that his real name was Charles Trout and that his initial training was as a wood and ivory carver.

St Julian emigrated to Adelaide in 1837, proceeding in 1839 to Sydney, where he wrote for The Australasian Chronicle, and subsequently for the Commercial Journal and Advertiser. In 1843 he joined the staff of The Sydney Morning Herald, which he left four years later for The Sydney Chronicle, afterwards known as the Free Press. In 1849 he rejoined The Sydney Morning Herald.

St Julian participated in municipal politics, serving on the Waverley council in 1860 and as its chairman in 1861. He went on to serve as an alderman on the Marrickville Borough Council from 1868 to 1871, and as Mayor from 1868 to 1869 and again in 1871. In February 1870, he became a magistrate.

In 1849, St Julian was appointed the Hawaiian Kingdom's Consul in Sydney by King Kamehameha III and Minister of Foreign Affairs Robert Crichton Wyllie. On 4 August 1853 he was appointed as "His Majesty's Commissioner, and Political and Commercial Agent to the Kings, Chiefs and Rulers of the Islands in the Pacific Ocean, not under the protection or sovereignty of any European Government". In 1859, he was appointed as "His Hawaiian Majesty's Chargé d'Affaires and Consul General to the Kings and Ruling Chiefs of the Independent States and Tribes in Polynesia South of the Equator". Corresponding with Wylie on many grandiose ideas to extend Hawaii's power in Oceania, he accomplished nothing significant but later inspired King Kalākaua's vision of a Polynesian confederacy in the 1880s.

St. Julian remained as Law Reporter for the Herald until 1872, when King Seru Epenisa Cakobau appointed him Chief Justice of Fiji. When Fiji became a British colony in 1874, Governor Sir Hercules Robinson proposed an annual pension of £200 for him, but he died near Levuka, Fiji on 26 November 1874.

== Personal life ==
St Julian was a Roman Catholic. He married Eleanor Heffernan at St Mary's Cathedral, Sydney, on 26 November 1839. She died on 28 August 1861. On 10 January 1863, he remarried, to Eliza Winifred Hawkesley, the daughter of the radical editor of the People's Advocate and New South Wales Vindicator, Edward John Hawksley.

Civic offices
Preceded by	Chairman of the Waverley Municipal Council; 1861 – 1862	Succeeded by
Preceded by Samuel Payten as Chairman	Mayor of Marrickville; 1868 – 1870	Succeeded by Joseph Graham
Preceded by Joseph Graham	Mayor of Marrickville; 1871 – 1872	Succeeded by Charles Teeson
Legal offices
Preceded by Charles Rossiter Forwood	Chief Justice of Fiji; 1872 – 1874	Succeeded by Sir William Hackett
