= Albert Ehrhardt =

British colonial judge

The Honourable Albert F. Ehrhardt

10th Attorney-General of Fiji
- In office May 1903 – 1914
- Monarchs: Edward VII; George V
- Governor: Sir Henry Jackson; Sir Everard im Thurn; Sir Charles Major (acting); Sir Francis May; Sir Ernest Sweet-Escott
- Preceded by: Henry Edward Pollock
- Succeeded by: Alfred Karney Young

Acting Chief Judicial Commissioner for the Western Pacific
- In office 1910 – 21 February 1911
- Monarch: George V
- Governor: Sir Charles Major (acting)
- Preceded by: Sir Charles Major
- Succeeded by: Sir Charles Major

Acting Chief Justice of Fiji
- In office 1910 – 21 February 1911
- Monarch: George V
- Governor: Sir Charles Major (acting)
- Preceded by: Sir Charles Major
- Succeeded by: Sir Charles Major

Personal details
- Born: 1862
- Died: 30 August 1929 (aged 66–67)
- Education: Worcester College, Oxford
- Occupation: Lawyer

Albert F. Erhardt (1862 – 30 August 1929) was a British lawyer, judge, and colonial administrator.

Erhardt graduated from Worcester College, Oxford in 1885 with a degree in Classics. He began practicing Law in 1889, before joining the colonial service in 1896 as District Commissioner of Lagos, now in Nigeria. He went on to become Resident of Ibadan, as well as Attorney-General and Treasurer of Lagos (succeeding F. C. Fuller, in 1902). In February 1903 he became Attorney-General of Fiji, serving until 1914. During this period he also filled in for Sir Charles Major, the Chief Justice of Fiji and Chief Judicial Commissioner for the Western Pacific, from 1910 to 1911, while Major was acting in an interim capacity as Governor of Fiji and High Commissioner for the Western Pacific. In his role as Attorney-General, he also served in the Executive Council and Legislative Council.

In 1914, he returned to Africa as a judge of the British East Africa Protectorate. His final post, in 1920, was as a temporary assistant legal adviser in the Colonial Office.

Legal offices
Preceded by Henry Edward Pollock	Attorney-General of Fiji; 1903-1914	Succeeded by Alfred Karney Young
Preceded by Sir Charles Major	Acting; Chief Judicial Commissioner for the Western Pacific; 1903-1914	Succeeded by Sir Charles Major
Preceded by Sir Charles Major	Acting; Chief Justice of Fiji; 1903-1914	Succeeded by Sir Charles Major
