= Solicitor General of Leeward Islands =

The Solicitor-General of Leeward Islands is a law officer of the government for Leeward Islands, subordinate to the Attorney General of the Leeward Islands. The office is one of the members of the government. The Solicitor General could also be a member of the General Assembly.

== List of Solicitors-General of Leeward Islands ==
- John Stanley (Hastings MP) 1771-1781 (and Attorney General 1781-1799)
- William MacBean George Colebrooke 13 February 1837-10 May 1837
- Henry Spencer Berkeley 1878 then acting in 1883 (acting attorney-general August 1877)
- Thomas Baynes (acting) 1881-1898 (then Senior Puisne Judge of Trinidad and Tobago)
- Charles Halman Beard 1889
