= Solicitor-General of the Australian Capital Territory =

Second Law Officer of Australian Capital Territory

Solicitor-General of Australian Capital Territory
- Incumbent; Peter Garrisson AM SC
- Justice and Community Safety Directorate
- Reports to: Attorney-General of the Australian Capital Territory
- Appointer: ACT Legislative Assembly
- Inaugural holder: Peter Garrison AM SC
- Formation: 2011

The Solicitor-General of Australian Capital Territory, often referred to as the Solicitor-General, is the territory's Second Law Officer, and the deputy of the Attorney-General. The Solicitor-General can exercise the powers of the Attorney-General in their absence. The Solicitor-General acts alongside the Crown Advocate and Crown Solicitor, and serves as one of the legal and constitutional advisers of the Crown and its government in the Australian Capital Territory.

The Solicitor-General is addressed in court as "Mr/Ms Solicitor". Despite the title, the position is currently occupied by a barrister, though any Australian legal practitioner of at least five years experience is eligible for appointment for a term of no more than seven years. The inaugural and current Solicitor-General is Peter Garrison AM SC.

== History and function ==
The Law Officers Act 2011 (ACT) (the Act) provides for the office of Solicitor-General. The Act provides for an appointment for a term not exceeding seven years, with the possibility of renewal.

== Office-holders (2011-present) ==
Name	Appointed	Concluded	Comments	Notes
Peter Garrison AM SC	August 2011	Incumbent	Formerly Deputy Chief Solicitor	
