= Tamboerskloof =

Suburb of Cape Town, in the Western Cape, South Africa

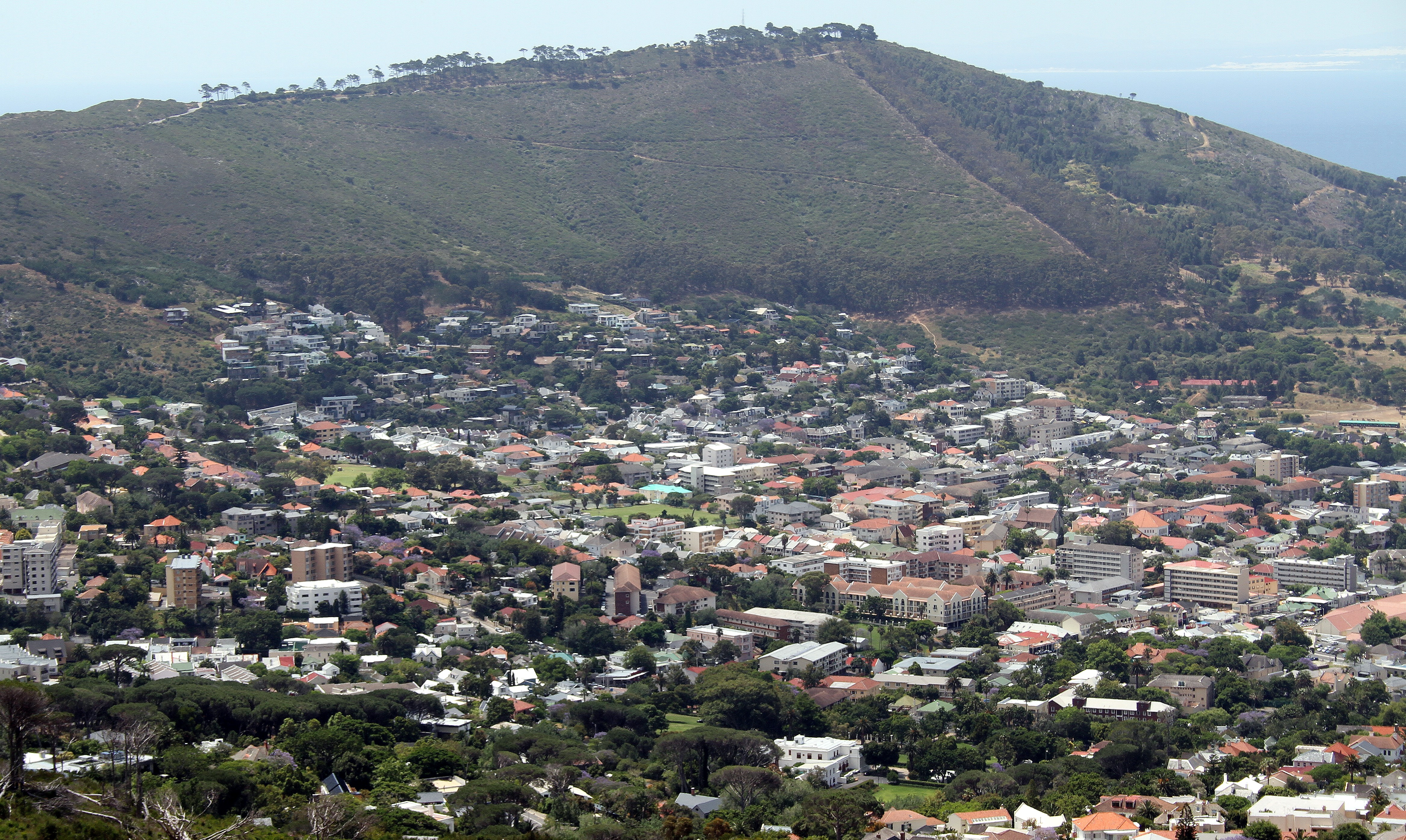
- Tamboerskloof seen from Tafelberg Road on Table Mountain
- Interactive map of Tamboerskloof
- Coordinates: 33°55′45″S 18°24′15″E
- Country: South Africa
- Province: Western Cape
- Municipality: City of Cape Town
- Main Place: Cape Town

Government
  - Type: Subcouncil 16 / Ward 77
  - Councillor: Francine Higham (DA)

Area
  - Total: 1.04 km^{2} (0.40 sq mi)

Population (2011)
  - Total: 2,984
  - Density: 2,870/km^{2} (7,430/sq mi)

Racial makeup (2011)
  - Black African: 14.7%
  - Coloured: 5.1%
  - Indian/Asian: 1.6%
  - White: 75.8%
  - Other: 2.7%

First languages (2011)
  - English: 62.6%
  - Afrikaans: 27.6%
  - Other: 9.9%
- Time zone: UTC+2 (SAST)
- Postal code (street): 8001
- Area code: 021
- Website: www.tbkwatch.com

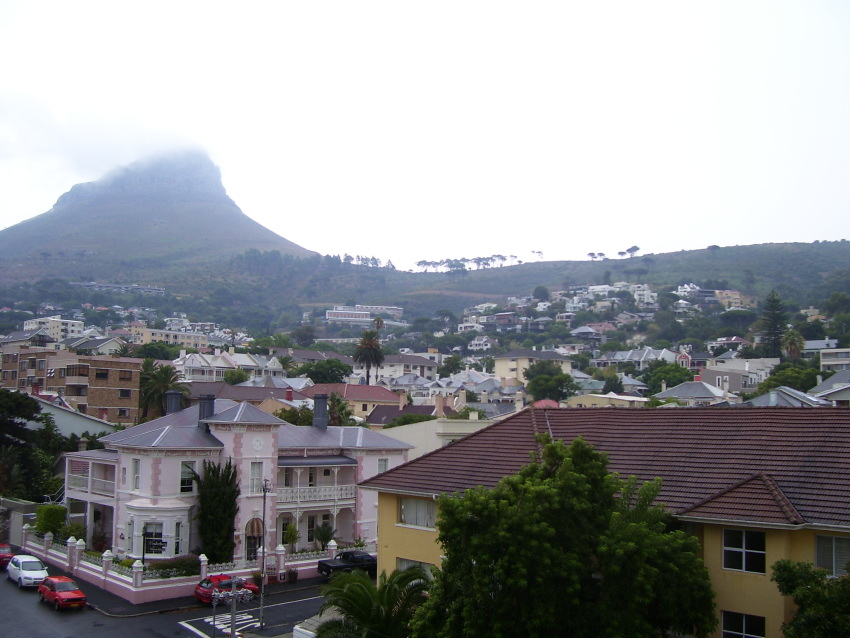
A view of Tamboerskoof

Tamboerskloof is a neighbourhood and suburb of Cape Town, South Africa. It lies on the slopes of Lion's Head and Signal Hill, adjacent to the neighbourhoods of Gardens and Bo-Kaap. Tamboerskloof is one of the contiguous group of neighbourhoods referred to as the City Bowl.

== Etymology ==
The name Tamboerskloof is derived from the Dutch and Afrikaans words tamboer (drum) and kloof (valley). When Dutch settlers arrived and set up farms in the 1650s, they established the first of a series of lookout points at the site where Tamboerskloof lies today. From these lookout points, watchmen would beat drums to alert farmers in the area to the approach of a ship. Thanks to this, farmers would know that it was time to make their way to Cape Town harbour with their crops.

== Neighbourhood Watch ==
The Tamboerskloof Neighbourhood Watch (TBKWatch) assists the community with volunteer patrols, a radio network, a CCTV network and reporting of service issues such as out of order street lights, traffic lights, potholes, and blocked drains. They work with a community control room (Watchcom), the South African Police Service, City of Cape Town Metro Police, nearby City Improvement Districts, as well as local armed response companies.

== Schools ==
Several schools can be found within Tamboerskloof, including:

- Tamboerskloof Primary School
- German International School Cape Town
- Jan van Riebeek Primary School
- Jan van Riebeek High School.

== Demographics ==
According to the 2001 Census, the population of Tamboerskloof was 2 921. The following tables show various demographic data about Tamboerskloof from that census.

Gender

Gender	Population	%
Female	1 375	47.07%
Male	1 546	52.93%

Ethnic Group

Group	Population	%
Black African	166	5.68%
Coloured	168	5.75%
Indian/Asian	27	0.92%
White	2 559	87.61%

Home Language

Language	Population	%
English	1 914	65.53%
Afrikaans	693	23.72%
Xhosa	58	1.99%
Other African languages	35	1.20%
Other languages	221	7.57%
