= Anthony Coll =

Jamaican chief justice (1861–1931)

Sir Anthony Michael Coll (1861–1931) was Chief Justice of Jamaica from 1910 to 1922 when he retired from public life.
