= Arnold Jonathan Bishop-Gooding =

Sierra Leonean lawyer

Personal details
- Born: Arnold Jonathan Bishop-Gooding; 24 March 1942 Freetown, Sierra Leone
- Children: Four children (Selina, Jacqueline, Gordon and Jason)
- Education: Sierra Leone Grammar School, Christ's College, Cambridge
- Occupation: Lawyer, civil servant, politician, consultant

Arnold Jonathan Bishop-Gooding (born 24 March 1942) is a lawyer from Sierra Leone, called to the Bar (Inner Temple) in 1968.

== Early life and education ==
Arnold Jonathan Bishop-Gooding was born in Freetown, Sierra Leone to parents of Creole descent. He attended the Sierra Leone Grammar School and subsequently matriculated at Cambridge University, where he earned a Bachelor of Laws and Master of Laws at Christ's College, Cambridge.

== Career ==
A barrister and solicitor, Bishop-Gooding established a private practice in 1968, Gooding & Gooding in Sierra Leone in General and Admiralty practice. He served as Secretary General of the Sierra Leone Bar Association from 1973-1974. He was appointed as a Member of the Sierra Leone National Constitutional Review Commission in 1990-1991. From 1991-1992 he was also appointed President of The Sierra Leone Bar Association. Under the NPRC government from 1992-1993 he served as Attorney General and Secretary of State for Justice, and then in 1993-1995 as Secretary of State for Transport and Communications and finally in 1995 as Secretary of State for Information, Broadcasting and Culture

After serving in government, Bishop-Gooding retired from public service and returned to private practice as a legal and business consultant at Selina House.

== Sources ==
- https://sl.usembassy.gov/wp-content/uploads/sites/195/Lawyers-List-Updated-December-2020.pdf
- https://photos.state.gov/libraries/sierraleone/232497/Other/Lawyerlist_updated_October-2008.pdf
- https://www.nytimes.com/1995/02/17/world/bandit-rebels-ravage-sierra-leone.html
