= Cecil William Victor Carey =

Irish barrister and colonial judge (1887–1976)

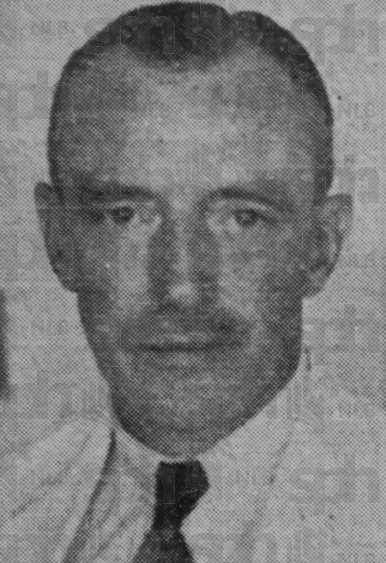
- Carey in 1940

Acting Chief Justice of Singapore
- In office April 1946 – June 1946
- Preceded by: Sir Percy Alexander McElwaine
- Succeeded by: Sir Charles Murray-Aynsley

Personal details
- Born: 6 October 1887
- Died: 29 October 1976 (aged 89)
- Children: 2 daughters
- Education: University of Dublin
- Profession: Barrister and colonial judge

Cecil William Victor Carey (6 October 1887 – 29 October 1976) was an Irish barrister and colonial judge who served as acting Chief Justice of Singapore in 1946.

== Early life and education ==
Carey was born on 6 October 1887 at Dublin, the second son of William Carey, solicitor. He was educated at Trinity College, University of Dublin where he received his BA and LLB, and in 1910 was called to the Irish Bar by King's Inns, Dublin.

== Career ==
Carey began his career practising at the Irish Bar serving from 1910 to 1915. In 1915, he joined the Colonial Service and went to Africa where he served for 25 years in various posts. From 1915 to 1921, he served in Uganda, first as assistant district officer and later as magistrate. He then transferred to Nigeria as Crown Counsel, and in 1930, was appointed a puisne judge of the Supreme Court of Nigeria, remaining in office until 1940 while also serving on occasion as acting Solicitor General of Nigeria.

Carey then went to British Malaya where he served as puisne judge of the Supreme Court of the Straits Settlements from 1940 to 1946. In 1941, he passed a sentence of death on a woman, a rare event at the time, after she had been found guilty of murder, and in 1946, passed the first death sentence under the Mountbatten Proclamation. During the Japanese occupation he was interned in Malaya from 1942 to 1945. After the War, on the re-opening of the Supreme Court of Singapore, he was appointed acting Chief Justice, Singapore, serving from April to June 1946, and from 1946 to 1948, served as judge of the Supreme Court of the Malayan Union. He retired in 1948.

== Personal life and death ==
Carey married Lucy Stokes who died in 1922. They had two daughters. Later, he married Isabella Morrison who died in 1932.
