= Claud Seton =

British lawyer and colonial judge

Sir Claud Ramsay Wilmot Seton Kt MC (30 June 1888 – 3 September 1982), also known as C.R.W. Seton, was a British solicitor, barrister, and colonial judge.

== Early life ==
Seton was one of the four children of Emily Georgina Walker and Reverend Andrew Ramsay Wilmot Seton, Vicar of Stow, Upland, Suffolk in 1883, a Councillor of Halsingden, Manchester in 1878, and a colonist and church clerk in South Africa during the 1890s.

Seton received his education at University College London. He then trained as a solicitor and practiced with a firm under the name of Shelton and Company. During World War I, he served as a Temporary 2nd Lieutenant in the Infantry Motor Machine Gun Corps, for which he was awarded a Military Cross.

== Colonial career ==
Following the War, Seton was a judge of the Jaffa district court in Mandatory Palestine for six years, from 1920 to 1926 (during which he rose to the position of vice-president). After, he was seconded to the government of the Emirate of Transjordan, where he served as Judicial Adviser, from 1926 to 1931. He was called to the Bar by Gray's Inn in 1928. He served as the President of the Haifa district court from 1931 to 1935. He then served as a Puisne Judge in Jamaica between 1935 and 1941. After this, he was appointed as the Chief Justice of Nyasaland from 1941 to 1945; Chief Justice of Fiji and Chief Judicial Commissioner for the Western Pacific from 1945 to 1949.

== Personal life ==
Seton married Mary Francis Bennett in 1933.

== Heraldry ==
In 1965, Seton had arms matriculated for him by the Scottish Court of the Lord Lyon as "Representer of Seton of Powderhall", his ancestor, Daniel Seton, a Scottish merchant who is said to have had 19 children from two marriages.

== National Honours ==
- United Kingdom:
  - Military Cross of the British Armed Forces
  - Knight Bachelor

== Foreign Honours ==
- Transjordan:
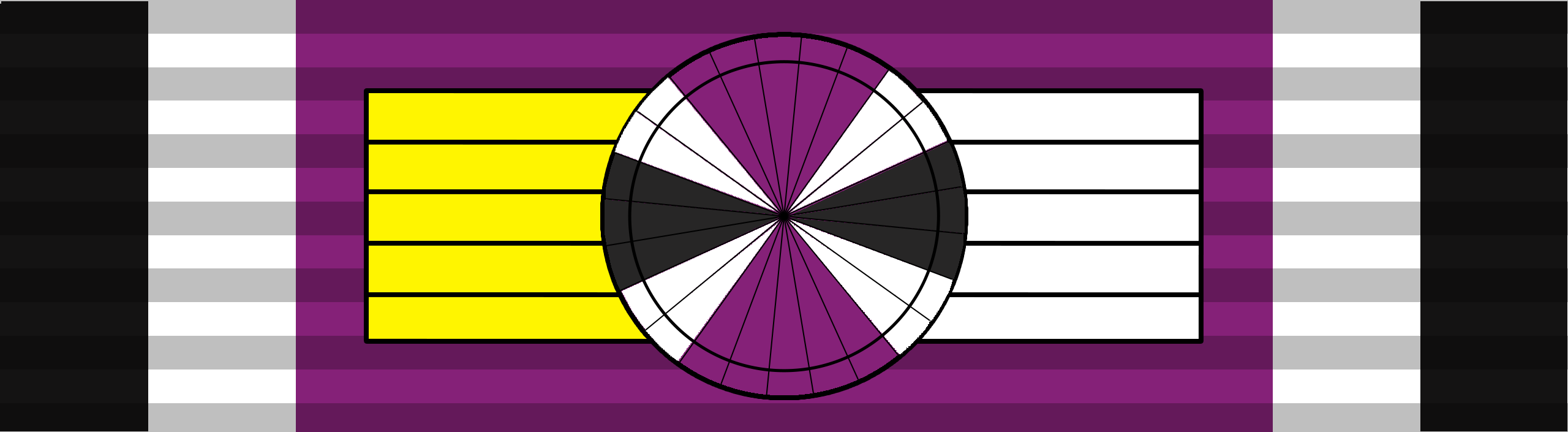
  - Grand Officer / Second Class of the Order of Independence (Jordan)
