= Chief Justice of Fiji =

Highest judicial officer of Fiji

- Tui Levu e Viti (Fijian) फिजी के मुख्य न्यायाधीश (Fiji Hindi)
- Coat of arms of the Republic of Fiji
- Incumbent; Salesi Temo since 24 December 2024
- Style: The Honourable
- Member of: Judiciary of Fiji
- Reports to: Prime Minister of Fiji
- Appointer: President of Fiji
- Term length: permanent basis- age limit 75 year (to retire)
- Formation: 1872
- First holder: Charles Rossiter Forwood

The chief justice is the Republic of Fiji's highest judicial officer. The office and its responsibilities are set out in Chapter 5 of the 2013 Constitution of Fiji. The chief justice is appointed by the president on the advice of the prime minister.

He is appointed by the president, and nominated by the prime minister, who is required by the Constitution to consult the attorney-general (Section 106-1). Under the previous 1997 Constitution, the prime minister was required to consult with the leader of the opposition. The appointment is permanent, until the chief justice reaches the age of 75 years (Section 110-1).

Like other judges, the chief justice need not be a Fijian citizen. When Sir Timoci Tuivaga retired in 2002, there were calls from the Citizens Constitutional Forum (a pro-democracy, human rights organization) for a foreigner to be appointed, to restore the independence of the judiciary that had been seen to be politically compromised by the 2000 coup. The government, however, appointed Fijian Daniel Fatiaki. In 2007, the military-backed interim government appointed Australian citizen Anthony Gates as the acting chief justice; he became the permanent chief justice on 5 December 2008.

== Powers of the chief justice ==
According to Chapter 5 of the 2013 Constitution, the chief justice sits on the High Court (Section 100) and presides over the Supreme Court (Section 98), but is barred from membership of the Court of Appeal. This stipulation is designed to give the Appeal Court a measure of independence from the other two courts. The chief justice also chairs the Judicial Service Commission (Section 104(a)).

According to the 2013 Constitution, the chief justice is also the first in the order of succession to discharge the duties of the president of Fiji as acting president should the president be unable to discharge her or his office or if the office becomes vacant for any reason. In other words, the chief justice is an ex-officio deputy to the president with a dormant commission which is invoked for the aforementioned reasons. The 2013 Constitution also stipulates that in the absence of the chief justice, the next senior most substantive judge performs the duties of the president as acting president.

== History of the office ==
Before 1871, when Seru Epenisa Cakobau established the first unified Kingdom of Viti under his authority, what is now Fiji was a patchwork of warring fiefdoms. Forming a government dominated by foreigners, Cakobau appointed Sir Charles St Julian, an Australian newspaper editor, as the first chief justice in 1872. St Julian died in office a few weeks after Cakobau ceded Fiji to the United Kingdom on 10 October 1874, under the provisions of the Pacific Islanders Protection Acts of 1872 (35 & 36 Vict. c. 19) and 1875 (38 & 39 Vict. c. 51), (amended in 1875), (long title: An Act for the Prevention and Punishment of Criminal Outrages upon Natives of the Islands in the Pacific Ocean) which sought to bring the rule of law to British subjects who were using unconventional methods to supply labour for the European-run cotton plantations in Fiji. St. Julian was followed as Chief Justice in 1875 by Sir William Hackett.

From 1877 through 1961, the chief justice of Fiji was ex officio chief justice of the High Commissioner's Court, more commonly known as the chief judicial commissioner for the Western Pacific, the chief judicial officer for the Western Pacific High Commission pursuant to the Western Pacific Orders-in-Council 1877 (amended in 1879 and 1880), and by the Pacific Order-in-Council 1893. (Note: "B. (1.) The Chief Justice and every other judge for the time being of the Supreme Court, shall be, by virtue of his office, a Judicial Commissioner for the Western Pacific for the purposes of this Order, and is in this Order referred to as a Judicial Commissioner. (2.) Where, in the opinion of the High Commissioner, the attendance of a Judicial Commissioner holding office as aforesaid is impracticable, or would be inconvenient, the High Commissioner may from time to time in the name and on behalf of Her Majesty, by writing under his hand and seal, appoint a person of legal knowledge and experience to be a Judicial Commissioner for particular purposes or for a particular time. The London Gazette, 8 September 1893 (26439), pp. 5119-5121.) Appeals lay to the Judicial Committee of the Privy Council in London. From 1942 to 1945 the High Commission was suspended by military administration during the War in the Pacific. Headed by a high commissioner for the Western Pacific, who was also ex officio the governor of Fiji, until the end of 1952, it included numerous islands, mostly small, throughout Oceania. Composition varied over time, but Fiji (1877-1952) and the Solomon Islands (1893-1976) were its most durable members.

From the beginning of 1953, Fiji and Tonga were separated from the High Commission as a prelude to full independence, and the High Commission offices were transferred to Honiara on Guadalcanal in the Solomon Islands. The office of high commissioner was separated from that of the governor of Fiji and was now held by the governor of the Solomon Islands). The High Commissioner's Court, however, continued to sit in Suva, and the chief justice of Fiji remained the chief judicial commissioner of the Western Pacific until 1962.

From 1962 onwards, functions of the High Commissioner's Court began to be transferred to the increasingly independent island states under the provisions of Western Pacific (Courts) Order in Council, 1961. The judicial commissioner for the Western Pacific became the chief justice of the High Court of the Western Pacific, and removed from Fiji to join the rest of the British High Commission in the Solomon Islands. The position was separated from that of the chief justice of Fiji.

Fiji gained independence on 10 October 1970 as the Dominion of Fiji. Although no longer connected with the British High Commission, the position of chief justice of Fiji continued to be filled by judges from Britain, Australia and New Zealand until the appointment of Sir Timoci Tuivaga in 1980.

The constitutional arrangements relating to the chief justice were temporarily overturned in 2000, following a counter-coup by Commodore Frank Bainimarama to neutralize a civilian coup d'état instigated by George Speight. The then-chief justice, Sir Timoci Tuivaga, recognized the Interim Military Government that took office and abrogated the Constitution on 29 May, and drafted the controversial Administration of Justice Decree that was immediately promulgated by the military administration. This decree abolished the Supreme Court, made the chief justice head of the Appeal Court, and raised the retirement age of the chief justice from 70 years to 75. These changes were reversed following a decision of the High Court to reinstate the Constitution on 15 November 2000, a decision upheld by the Appeal Court on 1 March 2001.

== Current chief justice ==
Salesi Temo is the current acting Chief Justice of Fiji.

== List of chief justices of Fiji ==
#	Incumbent	Portrait	Tenure		Head of State	Notes
#	Incumbent	Portrait	Took office	Left office	Head of State	Notes
Chief Justice of Fiji (1872-1874)
	Charles Rossiter Forwood; Acting		1872	1872	Seru Epenisa Cakobau	Filled in as Chief Justice in an interim capacity, pending the appointment of Sir Charles St Julian as the first substantive Chief Justice.
1.	Sir Charles St Julian		1872	27 August 1874	Seru Epenisa Cakobau; Victoria	Appointed during the short-lived Kingdom of Viti. Retired shortly before Fiji's annexation by the United Kingdom on 10 October 1874, but died a few weeks later – before a pension could be arranged.
2.	Sir William Hackett		1875	1876	Victoria	
Chief Justice of Fiji and Chief Judicial Commissioner for the Western Pacific (1877-1962)
3.	Sir John Gorrie		1877	1882	Victoria	
	Fielding Clarke; Acting		1882	1882	Victoria	
4.	Sir Henry Wrenfordsley		1882	1885	Victoria	
	Fielding Clarke; Acting for Wrenfordsley		1884	1885	Victoria	
5.	Fielding Clarke		1885	1889	Victoria	
6.	Sir Henry Berkeley		1889	1902	Victoria; Edward VII	
7.	Sir Charles Major		1902	1914	Edward VII; George V	
	Albert Ehrhardt Acting for Major		1910	21 February 1911	Edward VII; George V	Ehrhardt, the then Attorney-General of Fiji, acted as Chief Justice while Major, the incumbent Chief Justice, was acting as Governor of Fiji.
8.	Sir Charles Davson		1914	1922	George V	
	Sir Kenneth Muir MacKenzie; Acting		1922	1923	George V	
9.	Sir Alfred Young, KC		1923	1929	George V	
10.	Sir Maxwell Anderson, CBE, KC, RN (retd.)		1929	1936	George V Edward VIII	
11.	Owen Corrie, MC		1936	1945	Edward VIII; George VI	
12.	Sir Claud Seton, MC		1945	22 November 1949	George V	
13.	Sir James Thomson		1949	1953	George VI; Elizabeth II	
14.	Sir Ragnar Hyne		1953	1958	Elizabeth II	
15.	Sir Albert Lowe		1958	1962	Elizabeth II	
Chief Justice of Fiji (1962–present)
16.	Sir John MacDuff MC		1962	11 July 1963	Elizabeth II	Died in office.
	Sir Clifford Hammett; Acting		1963	1963	Elizabeth II	
17.	Richard Hugh Mills-Owens		1963	1967	Elizabeth II	
18.	Sir Clifford Hammett		1967	1972	Elizabeth II	Fiji became independent of the United Kingdom on 10 October 1970 as the Dominion of Fiji. All existing judicial and political office holders either remained in office, or were grandfathered into new roles. The role of the Chief Justice was unchanged.
19.	Sir John Nimmo, CBE		1972	1974	Elizabeth II	
20.	Sir Clifford Grant		1974	1980	Elizabeth II	
21.	Sir Timoci Tuivaga		1980	31 July 2002	Elizabeth II; Sitiveni Rabuka; Ratu Sir Penaia Ganilau; Ratu Sir Kamisese Mara; Ratu Josefa Iloilo	Following two military coups in 1987, Fiji became a republic. A President replaced the Monarch as Head of State. Chief Justice Tuivaga remained in office throughout.
22.	Daniel Fatiaki		1 August 2002	3 January 2007 (de facto); 5 December 2008 (de jure)	Ratu Josefa Iloilo	Following the military coup on 5 December 2006, Fatiaki was sent on leave on 3 January 2007. He attempted to return to his office later that month, but was formally suspended by the Republic of Fiji Military Forces on 19 January. He formally resigned on 5 December 2008.
23.	Anthony Gates		3 January 2007 (de facto); 18 December 2008 (de jure)	8 April 2019	Ratu Josefa Iloilo; Ratu Epeli Nailatikau; George Konrote	Appointed Acting Chief Justice by the Republic of Fiji Military Forces on 3 January 2007, he succeeded to the office substantively on 5 December 2008, following Fatiaki's resignation.
24.	Justice Kamal Kumar		8 April 2019	30 January 2023 (suspended)	Jioji Konrote, OF, MC (former President of Fiji from 2015–21)	Appointed Acting Chief Justice by President Wiliame Katonivere on the advice of Prime Minister Sitiveni Rabuka
