= Abdul Serry-Kamal =

Sierra Leonean lawyer and politician

Minister of Justice and Attorney General of Sierra Leone
- Incumbent
- Assumed office 14 October 2007
- President: Ernest Bai Koroma

Personal details
- Born: Abdul Franklyn Serry-Kamal; April 10, 1944 Makeni, British Sierra Leone
- Died: January 18, 2014 (aged 69) Maryland, U.S.
- Party: All People's Congress (APC)
- Profession: Lawyer

Abdul Franklyn Serry-Kamal (April 10, 1944- January 18, 2014) was a Sierra Leonean lawyer and politician. He was a longtime member of the All People's Congress (APC) political party.

== Career ==
A native of Bombali District in Northern Sierra Leone, Serry-Kamal served as an elected member of the Sierra Leone Parliament from his home District of Bombali from 1996 to 1997 as a member of the All People's Congress (APC).

In 2007 he was appointed by Sierra Leone's President Ernest Bai Koroma as Sierra Leone's Minister of Justice and Attorney General. He served in that position until he was sacked in 2010.

== Death ==
Serry-Kamal died on January 18, 2014, at the Johns Hopkins Hospital in Maryland in the United States.
