= John Gorrie (judge) =

British judge (1829–1892)

Sir John Gorrie (30 March 1829 – 4 August 1892) was a British judge who served through the British colonies of the nineteenth century.

== Early life ==
John Gorrie was born in the parish of Kingskettle, Fife, Scotland, a son of the Rev. Daniel Gorrie, United Presbyterian Minister, and Jane Moffat. He was educated at the village school, subsequently at Madras College, St Andrews, and then at the University of Edinburgh. He was called to the Scottish Bar in 1856. In 1862, he became a leader-writer on the Morning Star, having as colleagues many men who subsequently distinguished themselves in literature and politics.

== Judicial work ==
In 1865, on the news reaching the UK of the disturbances in Jamaica, which led ultimately to the removal and attempted trial of Governor Edward Eyre, Gorrie was invited by the Jamaica Committee to go out to represent them before the Royal Commission in the colony. This service, which extended over several months, having been performed to the entire satisfaction of his constituents, Gorrie returned to his usual vocations in London until 1868, when he offered his services to the Border Burghs. Finding, however, that his candidature would split up the advanced Liberal party, a portion of whom considered themselves pledged to Sir George (then Mr. Trevelyan), he withdrew.

In 1869, Gorrie was offered and accepted the post of Substitute Procureur-General in Mauritius, and a few months after his arrival became a Puisne judge. He was a member of a Commission that discovered an extraordinary system of legal oppression upon natives of India who had completed their indentures as coolies. Gorrie boldly protected the Creoles and coolies alike from all attempted oppression.

In 1876, he was appointed Chief Justice of Fiji. In the new colony of Fiji, an altogether different native race and language had to be studied, and as the Chief Justice was a member of the Legislative Council, a different class of work had to be undertaken. Perhaps the most useful work done by Gorrie at that time was the application of the Torrens system of land titles to the land which had been acquired by Europeans in the new colony. Whilst engaged in these labours, the High Commission for the Western Pacific was organized by an Order in Council (1877), the Chief Justice becoming Chief Justice of Fiji and Chief Judicial Commissioner for the Western Pacific. He also acted for upwards of one year as High Commissioner.

After being knighted in 1882, Sir John was appointed to the old West India Colonies, now united into the Leeward Islands, as Chief Justice of the Leeward Islands. While there, he contributed most materially to overthrow the custom of consignee's lien, which favoured the London merchant at the expense of local creditors; and also the Encumbered Estates Court, which made West Indian properties change hands in London without giving people in the locality a chance to bid.

Sir John drafted with great labour an ordinance to introduce Indefeasible Titles, and to give security for local advances. This ordinance ultimately became law, and Sir John received a unanimous vote of thanks from the Leeward Islands Legislature. Appointed Chief Justice of Trinidad in 1885, he was asked to remain in the Leeward Islands until 1886.

In 1885, Sir John was transferred to Trinidad as Chief Justice of Trinidad, moving in 1886. In both that island and in Tobago, annexed to Trinidad in 1889, he energetically endeavoured to make the Courts of Justice accessible to all, to administer justice impartially, and to promote measures for the well being of the colony. An Australian newspaper wrote,

On his return to the colony lately from a visit home, the reception accorded to him was of an impressive and enthusiastic character,

but this welcome was not universal. Because of his attempts to help the underdog, encouraging sharecroppers, peasants, and labourers in Tobago to assert their rights and attempting to ease the financial burdens on Trinidad's black population, the élites of both Trinidad and Tobago saw Gorrie as a threat to their interests.

As a result of a campaign to remove him, a commission investigated his administration of justice in Trinidad and Tobago, and when the governor suspended him from office pending a final decision in London, he returned to Britain in the middle of 1892 to fight his case personally but died a few days after arrival on 4 August 1892.

== Family ==
Sir John Gorrie married, on 6 December 1855, Marion, daughter of Michael Graham of Edinburgh, who died in 1884, leaving issue.

His daughter, Isabella Jane Gorrie (born 1865), married Hamilton Hunter (born 1846), (Consul of Tonga 1901), Deputy Commissioner for Western Pacific 1881, who tried a murder case on Pitcairn Island. His son, Malcolm Graham (born 1864), followed his father into law, becoming a barrister and working as Sir John's secretary until Sir John's death.

== Sources ==
- Brereton, Bridget (1997). Law, Justice and Empire: The Colonial Career of John Gorrie 1829–1892.
