= Maxwell Hendry Maxwell-Anderson =

British barrister and colonial judge

Captain Sir Maxwell Hendry Maxwell-Anderson CBE KC
- Born: Maxwell Hendry Anderson; 23 March 1879; Ashwell Thorpe, Norfolk
- Died: 9 June 1951 (aged 72); Kenya
- Burial place: Ta' Braxia Cemetery, Gwardamangia, Malta
- Relatives: John Hendry Anderson, Alice Hornor
- Military career
- Allegiance: British
- Branch: Navy
- Rank: Captain
- Other work: Barrister and judge

Captain Sir Maxwell Hendry Maxwell-Anderson CBE KC (born Maxwell Hendry Anderson; 23 March 1879 – 9 June 1951) (also Maxwell Hendry Anderson) was a British naval officer, barrister and judge who was Chief Justice of Fiji and Judicial Commissioner for the Western Pacific.

== Biography ==
=== Early life ===
He was born in Ashwell Thorpe, Norfolk. His father was John Hendry Anderson (1853–1913), a curate in Norfolk who was later Rector of Tooting Graveney and Mayor of Wandsworth. His mother was Alice Hornor, born in Norwich.

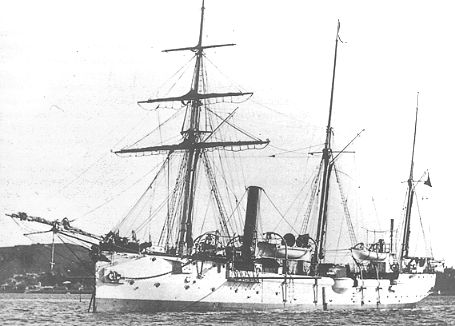
HMS Sparrow in c. 1900

Soon after his birth the family moved to the south coast when his father was appointed assistant master at Portsmouth Grammar School. Anderson probably attended the school which had (and still retains) naval links; he subsequently joined the Royal Navy as a midshipman aged 14, on 15 July 1893.

He passed his first-class navigating exams and was promoted Navigating Lieutenant (acting). In 1900 he sailed on the Redbreast class gunboat HMS Sparrow for a three-year posting to the Australia Station. Sparrow joined Pylades, Torch and Archer at their base in Sydney. Sparrow escorted the royal yacht SS Ophir around the New Zealand coast during the visit by the Duke and Duchess of Cornwall and York (the future George V and Queen Mary) in June 1901, receiving his promotion to Lieutenant at the end of the cruise on 30 June.

The Sparrow made two three-month visits to the Solomon Islands, one in 1901 and one in 1902. During the second of these a Fijian woman was murdered, and Sparrow engaged in some gunboat diplomacy by firing a few blank shells into implicated villages. Anderson wrote an extensive and interesting report on the 1902 cruise of the Sparrow, which was printed in the Sydney Morning Herald. He was in Wellington, New Zealand in March 1903. Sparrow's commission ran out while she was still in the Pacific, and Anderson probably returned to Britain in 1904 with the other officers and crew by mail steamer.

HMS Hermes in Simon's Bay on George V's Coronation Day, 1911

He left the Active list on 30 June 1909 on his promotion to acting Commander (retd.) According to the 1911 census he was on HMS Hermes, stationed in Simonstown, South Africa, serving at the Cape Station.

In 1913 both his father and his young sister died. The same year he married Mildred Florence Hughes-Jones (b. Pembrokeshire c1878–5 June 1945); they had one daughter, Meriol.

=== World War I and the Prize Court ===
On the outbreak of war Anderson was attached to HMS President for "Special Service at the Admiralty". In 1916 he was nominally attached to the Trade Division of the Admiralty Staff. (Note: Working closely with the Ministry of Shipping, the Admiralty Trade Division was responsible for the protection of maritime trade and troop transport, by organising merchant convoys with RN escorts and by the fitting of armaments in merchant vessels.National Archives, Records of Naval Staff Departments.) Having qualified as a barrister, from March 1916 onwards he acted as counsel for the Admiralty in the many prize law claims arising from the capture or sinking of enemy vessels by British ships during the war.

Although many countries (including Germany and the USA) had abjured the use of prize money by 1914, Britain and France signed an agreement that November establishing government jurisdiction over prizes captured singly or jointly by the signatories. Russia and Italy acceded in March 1915 and January 1917 respectively.

In Britain, until the passing of the Navy Prize Act 1918 a bounty was paid to all ships present at an enemy vessel's actual destruction; each man on board the victorious ship(s), without distinction of rank, shared the money awarded by the court, based on the sum of £5 ($25) for each man on board the enemy ship. For example, a captured or sunk battleship with a complement of 453 officers and men (confirmed as soon as possible by affidavit) was worth £2,265.

Anderson published his preparatory research into the legal questions surrounding the subject in his book Navy and prize: an essay (Anderson 1916). This concise volume reviewed the state of maritime law regarding prize bounty, salvage, and recapture.

The war-time claims were heard in the Prize Court, part of the Admiralty Division of the High Court of Justice; its President at the time was Sir Samuel Evans. The Admiralty's counsel appeared on behalf of the ships' officers and crew, and the Crown counsel's job (according to Anderson) was partly to ensure that the court was not over-generous in its awards.

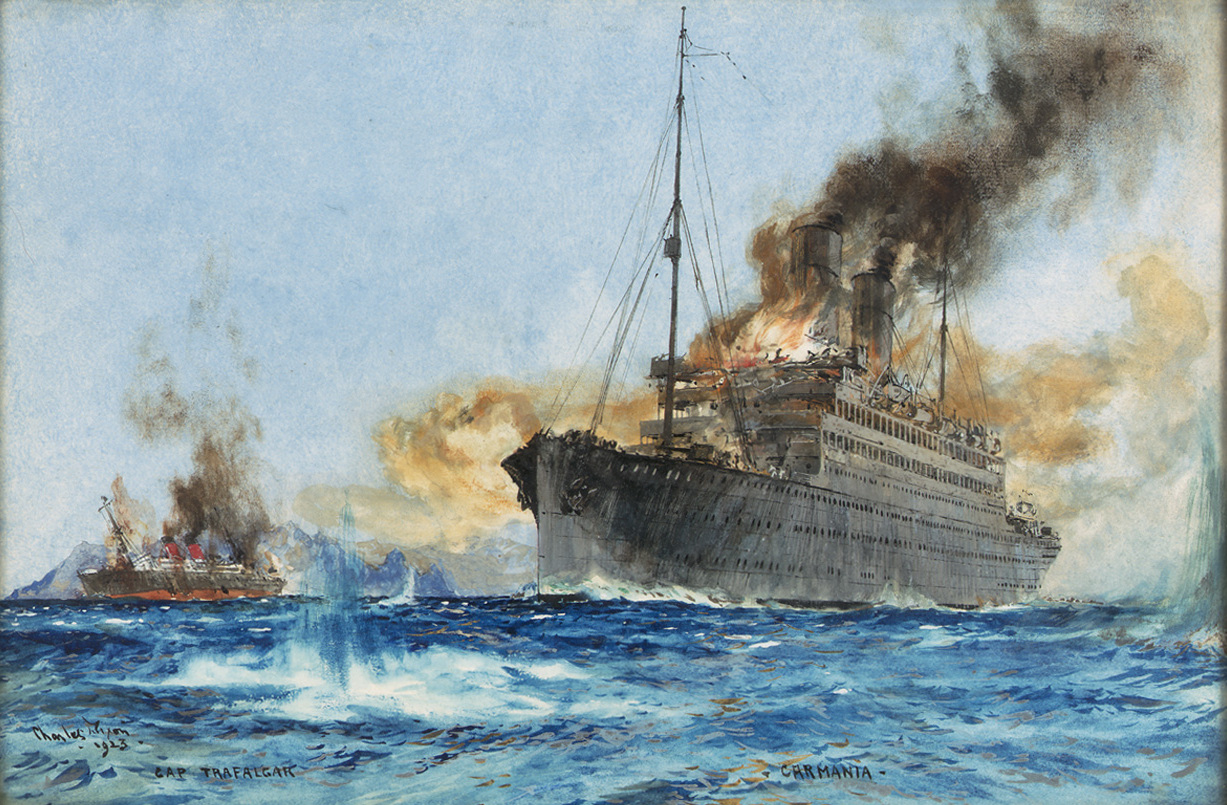
Action between Carmania and Cap Trafalgar off Trindade

Anderson appeared for the Admiralty in the first of these cases, which involved the sinking of SMS Cap Trafalgar by HMS Carmania in September 1914 (case heard 27 March 1916). The court upheld the claim, and many others. Anderson's later cases in the Prize Court include:

- The first actual engagement of the war, the sinking of the auxiliary cruiser SMS Kaiser Wilhelm der Grosse in August 1914 (case heard 3 July 1916)
- Siege of Tsingtao, October–November 1914: seven German warships (case heard 23 April 1917). The motion revolved around a point of law: whether the involvement of the Army in the combined action took the claim outside the provisions of the Navy Prize Act 1864. Anderson, with a sense of history, drily noted that the last time this type of claim had been heard in the Court was a hundred years earlier, regarding La Bellone. (Note: Bellone was the flagship of the French squadron involved in the defence of the Île de France (Mauritius) at the Battle of Grand Port, and was captured when the island fell on 8 December 1810 after combined British Army and Naval operations.) Judgement was reserved.
- Battle of the Falkland Islands, December 1914, in which the armoured cruisers SMS Scharnhorst and Gneisenau were sunk, along with the light cruisers Dresden, Nürnberg and Leipzig. This was the first fleet action prize claim of the war.
- Battleship SMS Blücher sunk in the Battle of Dogger Bank January 1915 (case heard 15 January 1917)
- Battle for Lake Tanganyika Christmas 1915, in which HMS Mimi and HMS Toutou captured the German Kingani, renamed HMS Fifi

In addition to the purely Naval cases, Anderson successfully presented the claims of British airmen involved in the sinking or destruction of enemy ships. Among these were:

- SMS Königsberg, scuttled July 1915 in the Rufiji River in east Africa: the first RNAS claim. Motion upheld.
- The sinking in January 1918 of the Midilli (the former SMS Breslau) during the Battle of Imbros, when several aircraft from Ark Royal took part in the action. This was the first prize claim (worth £2,750) involving the newly formed Royal Air Force. Among the air observers and pilots involved was the future Air Marshal Ralph Sorley. The court upheld the claim.

These cases established a precedent relating to the application in the air of the principles of maritime prize law: it eventually found its way into UK legislation in the Prize Act 1939, replacing the Naval Prize Acts of 1864 and 1918.

He was a member of the Grotius Society, and Fellow of the Zoological Society of London, 1917–1919.

His book, The Elements of Pilotage and Navigation was re-published in 1917, along with an article entitled "Military Salvage". He was awarded the OBE in January 1918.

=== Post War: Liberal Party candidate ===
He stood as the Liberal Party (UK) candidate for the newly created constituency of Balham and Tooting in the December 1918 United Kingdom general election. Taking his election address as an example, the historian Matthew Johnson remarks: "Many candidates were careful to present their wartime military service not only as a marker of martial masculinity but as a demonstration of their roots within a constituency, emphasizing service in a local regiment as a means of tapping into the politics of place—one of the more potent sources of resistance to the nationalization of politics after 1918." His late father, John Hendry Anderson, had been rector of Tooting Graveney.

By January 1919 he had taken silk, been promoted Captain (retd.) and been awarded the rank's attendant CBE.

General election 1918: Balham and Tooting
Party		Candidate	Votes	%	±%
C	Unionist	John Denison-Pender	12,405	59.7	n/a
	Labour	Frank Smith	3,586	17.2	n/a
	Independent Democrat	Alfred James Hurley	1,805	8.7	n/a
	Liberal	Maxwell Anderson	1,542	7.4	n/a
	Ind. Conservative	William Hunt	1,457	7.0	n/a
Majority			8,819	42.5	n/a
Turnout				51.7	n/a
	Unionist win (new seat)				
C indicates candidate endorsed by the coalition government.

=== Colonial service ===
After the war Anderson served in the judiciary of the Colonial Service. From 1919–1929 he was Attorney General of Gibraltar. He was known as Maxwell Maxwell-Anderson from 1919, although he didn't officially change his name until 1932. Anderson was a Freemason, and he was appointed District Grand Master of the Western Mediterranean in 1926. Anderson was appointed Chief Justice of Fiji and Chief Judicial Commissioner of the Western Pacific, 5 September 1929 He officially changed his name by deed poll to Maxwell Hendry Maxwell-Anderson in December 1932. He was knighted in 1934 and retired from the Navy in February 1936.

=== Later life and death ===
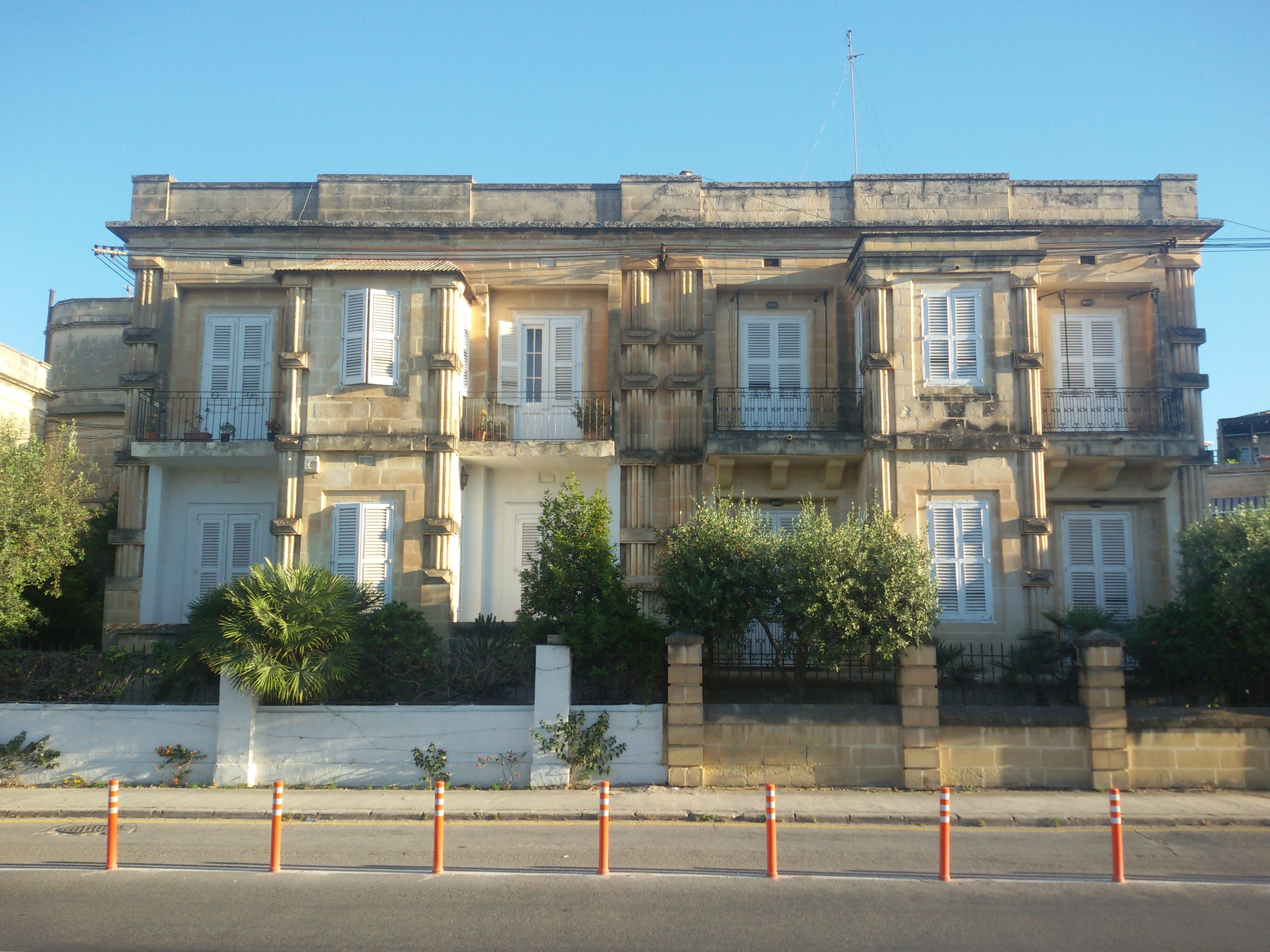
Villa Gloria

He retired with his wife Mildred to Malta, where they lived at "Villa Gloria", Ta' Xbiex. He was a member of the United Service Club and Union Club (Malta). He was involved with several Masonic lodges:

- 1937 Member of the Thirty-First Degree
- 1938-1939 Sovereign of the Wignacourt Conclave No.141 (Note: Order of the Red Cross of Constantine, Division of Melita (Mediterranean), Malta (const. 1880, disbanded 1972))
- 1940 Sovereign of the Ancient and Accepted (Scottish?) Rite Rose of Sharon Chapter No.35
- 1944 Eminent Preceptor of the Knights Templar, and Knights of Malta Melita Preceptory No.37
- 1946 Member of the Thirty-Second Degree (Sublime Prince of The Royal Secret)

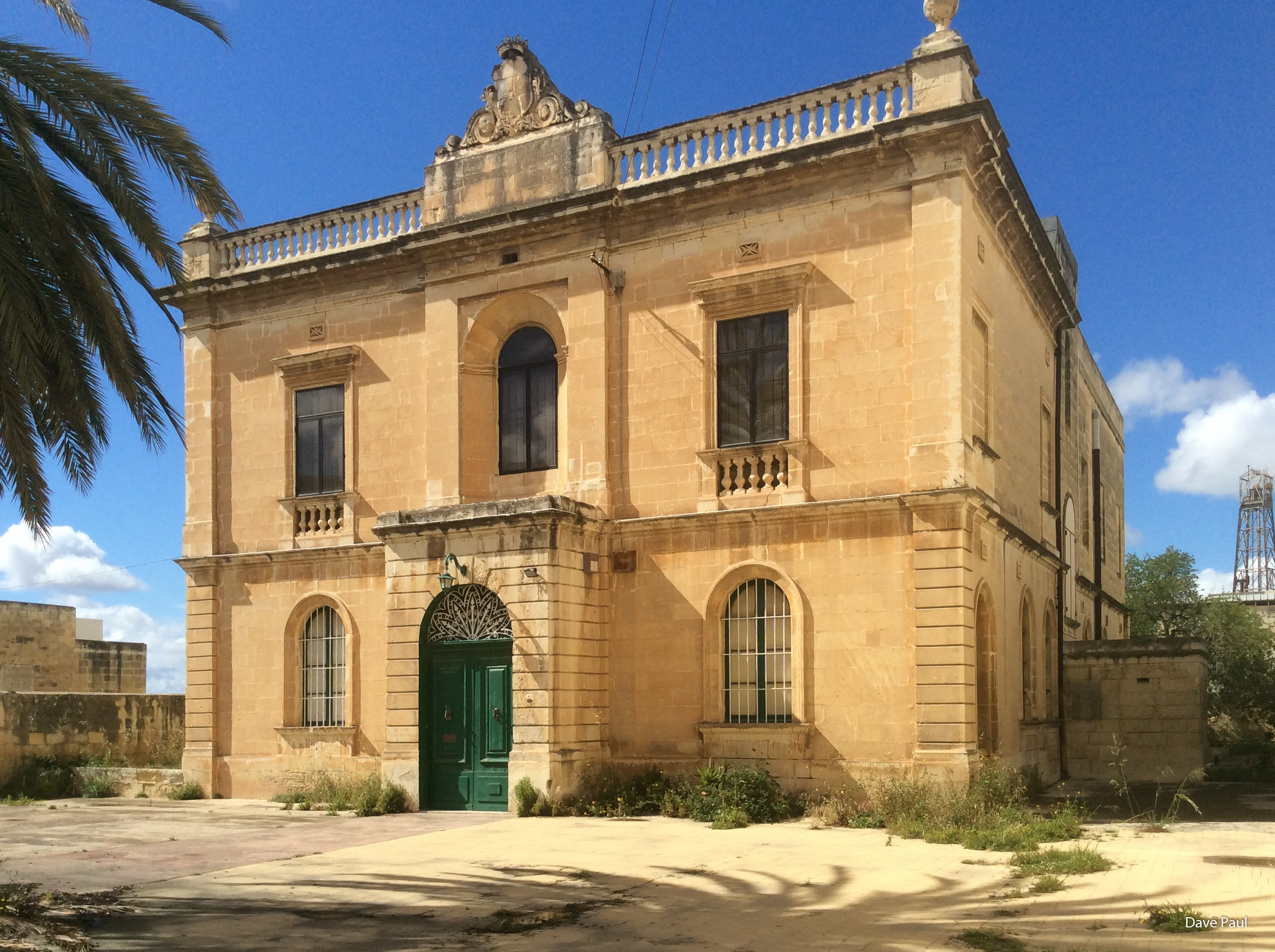
Villa Blye

During the Siege of Malta the Temple of his Masonic lodge (Villa Blye, Paola) was destroyed; its rebuilding in 1944 was largely due to his efforts.

His wife Mildred died in Malta on 5 June 1945, a month after VE Day. In August 1947, aged 68, he returned to the colonial judiciary: he was appointed 2nd Class Magistrate in a 2nd Class Court in Trans Nzoia District, Rift Valley Province, Kenya.

He possibly died in Kenya, and was buried in Ta' Braxia cemetery, Gwardamangia, Malta, 12 June 1951. (Note: Gravestone inscriptions in Ta' Braxia cemetery: Mildred Maxwell-Anderson, aged 67 years, born in Pembrokeshire, the wife of Sir Maxwell Maxwell-Anderson, died 5th June 1945; Maxwell Hendry Maxwell-Anderson, aged 71 years, born in Aberdeen, Captain, Royal Navy retired, buried 12th June 1951.; Source: Index of Ta' Braxia cemetery at Malta Family History. Retrieved 18 November 2013. (N.B. He was almost certainly not born in Aberdeen, but in Ashwell Thorpe. He may have liked to emphasise his Scottish ancestry.))

== Selected works ==
- Anderson, Maxwell H. (1916). The Navy and Prize: an essay. London: John Hogg.
- Anderson, Maxwell H. (1917a). The Elements of Pilotage and Navigation, with notes on the correction of compasses ... (2nd, revised ed.). London: Gieves Publishing.
- Anderson, Maxwell H. (1917b). "Military salvage". Journal of the Society of Comparative Legislation. New Series. 17 (1/2). Cambridge University Press: 233–237. JSTOR 752255.
