= James Cochrane (judge) =

Chief Justice of Gibraltar (1798–1883)

Sir James Cochrane
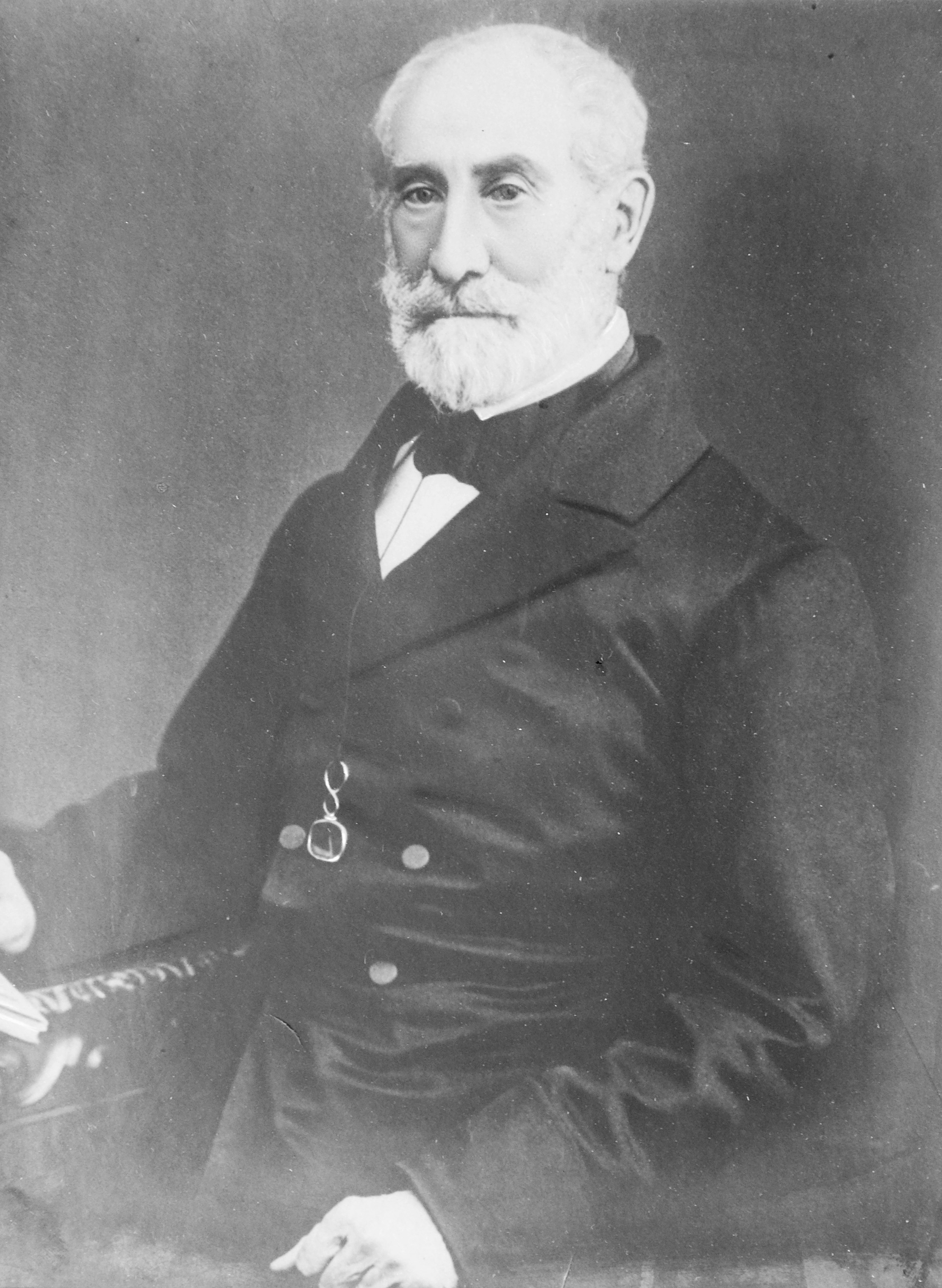

Chief Justice of the Supreme Court of Gibraltar
- In office 1841–1877
- Succeeded by: Anthony Dudley

Personal details
- Born: 1798 Nova Scotia
- Died: 24 June 1883 (aged 84–85) Glen Rocky, Gibraltar
- Spouse: Theresa Haly (m. 1829; died 1873)
- Relations: Thomas Cochran (brother)
- Children: Thomas Cochrane
- Parent(s): Thomas Cochran; Augusta Jane Allan
- Occupation: Lawyer
- Profession: Judge

Sir James Cochrane (1798 – 24 June 1883) was Chief Justice of Gibraltar. One of the most notable cases he handled was the enquiry into the Mary Celeste. Judge's Cave in Gibraltar is named for him.

== Early life ==
Cochrane was the son of Thomas Cochrane, speaker of the House of Assembly of Nova Scotia, and was born there in 1798. Among his large family was his elder half-sister, Margaret Cochran, the wife of Sir Rupert George, the Commodore for the Royal Navy's North America Station. Two other sisters were Elizabeth Cochran (wife of Rt. Rev. John Inglis, Bishop of Nova Scotia) and Isabella Cochran (wife of Dean Edward Bannerman Ramsay). His brother was Thomas Cochran, who served as the third Chief Justice of Prince Edward Island and later in Upper Canada where he perished in Lake Ontario in 1804.

== Career ==
He was called to the bar at the Inner Temple in 1829 and he became the Attorney General of Gibraltar in 1837. He was replaced in that position by the Irish attorney Marcus Costello when he was made chief justice there on the 3 July 1841. He was knighted in 1845.

During his time in Gibraltar he presided over the Vice Admiralty Court in December 1872 which enquired into the fate of the Mary Celeste, a ship that was found abandoned at sea without any rational explanation.

Cochrane resigned in 1877 after serving as Chief Justice for thirty-six years. On that occasion General Lord Napier of Magdala, Governor of the fortress, said of him:

"During the long time that Sir James Cochrane has presided over the supreme court at Gibraltar he has eminently maintained the high character of the bench. The clearness of his judgment, the wisdom of his decisions, and his personal character have commanded the respect of all classes of the community. He has done much for the lower classes, and his firmness and perfect fairness have helped greatly to dispel from the city of Gibraltar the crime of using the knife, which was unfortunately once so prevalent."

== Personal life ==
Cochrane had married Theresa in 1829, daughter of Colonel William Haly, who died in 1873. He died at Glen Rocky, his house in Gibraltar, on 24 June 1883, leaving one son, the Rev. Thomas Cochrane, rector of Stapleford Abbotts in Essex. He is buried at Witham's Cemetery in Gibraltar.

When Cochrane was first appointed, he had a villa constructed during the 1840s and whilst it was being built a cave was discovered. Judge's Cave took its name from Cochrane. The cave was of some importance as it contained human remains and early visitors to the cave included Abbe Henri Breuil, George Busk and local investigator William Willoughby Verner Cole.
