= Hubert Flaxman =

British colonial administrator & judge (1893-1976)

Brigadier Sir Hubert Flaxman CMG

Resident Commissioners of the New Hebrides
- In office 1950–1955
- Preceded by: Richard Denis Blandy
- Succeeded by: John Shaw Rennie

Attorney-General of Gibraltar
- In office October 1955 – December 1955
- Preceded by: Charles Campbell Ross
- Succeeded by: Denys Roberts

Chief Justice of Gibraltar
- In office 1955–1965
- Preceded by: Roger Sewell Bacon
- Succeeded by: Edgar Unsworth

Personal details
- Born: 22 July 1893
- Died: 23 June 1976 (aged 82)
- Spouse(s): Muriel Kathleen Bateman Vivien Aderna Barton (m. 1961; died 2016)
- Parent: James Flaxman (father)
- Education: Drapers' School, Purley, London
- Military career
- Allegiance: United Kingdom
- Branch: British Army
- Service years: 1914-1921; 1944-1949
- Rank: Brigadier
- Conflicts: World War I World War II
- Awards: Order of the Nile

Brigadier Sir Hubert James Marlowe Flaxman, CMG (22 July 1893 – 23 June 1976) was a British colonial administrator and judge.

== Biography ==
Flaxman was born on 22 July 1893, the son of James and Florence Flaxman. He was educated at Drapers' Schools, Purley and in St Gall in Switzerland.

He served in the British Army during the First World War from 1914 to 1921. He became a political officer in Mesopotamia in 1918. He then joined Sudan Civil Service in 1924, first as District Commissioner; then as District Judge in 1926 and Judge of the High Court in 1933. He was called to the English bar at the Middle Temple in 1934.

In 1940 he was appointed Chief Justice of the Sudan, serving until 1944. He then served with the British Army from 1944 to 1949, reaching the rank of Brigadier, and was mentioned in despatches. In 1949 he became the British Judge on the Joint Court in the New Hebrides. From 1950 to 1955 he was Resident Commissioners of the New Hebrides. He was acting Attorney-General of Gibraltar from October to December 1955, when he was appointed Chief Justice of Gibraltar. He retired in September 1965.

Flaxman was appointed to the Egyptian Order of the Nile (4th Class) in 1934, a Commander of the Order of Saint Michael and Saint George (CMG) in the 1954 Birthday Honours. He was knighted in the 1962 New Year Honours.

== Family ==
Flaxman Muriel Kathleen Bateman (died 1961); they had a son- James Raymond, born 1923 in Iraq (James' daughter Carol married Alistaire Warren Crooke of MI6). He then married secondly in 1961, Vivien Aderna Barton; she died in 2016.
