= Australian World War I poetry =

The Great War produced a large number of Australian poets. Both men and women, soldiers, nurses, civilians and even children wrote poetry about the war. There were five main arenas where Australian Great War Poetry was written in the period of 1914 to 1939: the Home Front, Gallipoli, The Middle East, The Western Front and England. Australian poets weren't as well established as their British counterparts, however, in their poetry, they too expressed humorous, melancholy, anger or longing for home. Many Australian servicemen, for example, wrote about the Australian flora, and how they missed it.

== Soldiers ==
Many poets served in more than one campaign, while others only served in one, either joining up after Gallipoli, or being invalided back home or killed in action. A small listing of Australian Great War Poets can be seen below.

- Leon Gellert (Note: Gellert, Leon (1917) Songs of a Campaign. Angus & Robertson: Sydney)
- Frank Westbrook
- Oliver Hogue writing as Trooper Bluegum
- Tom Skeyhill (Note: Skeyhill, Tom (ND) Soldier Songs from Anzac. George Robertson & Company: Melbourne)
- Frederic Manning (Note: Manning, Frederic (1917) Eidola. E.P. Dutton and Company: New York)
- Edwin Gerard (Note: Trooper Gerardy (1919) Australian Light Horse Ballads and Rhymes. H.H. Champion Australian Authors’ Agency: Melbourne)
- Geoffrey Wall (Note: Wall, Geoffrey (1917) Songs of an Airman. Australian Authors’ Agency: Melbourne)
- Walter James Redfern Turner (Note: Turner, W.J. (1918) The Dark Fire. Sidgwick & Jackson: London)
- William McDonald (Note: McDonald, W.M. (ND) Soldiers Songs from Palestine. Edward A. Vidler: Melbourne)
- Ion Idriess
- Andrew Barton Paterson and many others.

== Nurses ==
- Christine Erica Strom (Note: Bonwick, C.E. (1917) Diary of Australian Army Nurse Christine Erica Strom. (NP): (NC))
- Alice Ross-King
- Emily 'Beryl' Henson.

== Civilian men ==
- Archibald Strong
- Arthur Henry Adams
- Bernard Patrick O’Dowd
- C.J. Dennis (Note: Dennis, C.J. (1916) The Moods of Ginger Mick. Angus & Robertson: Sydney & Dennis, C.J. (1915) The Songs of a Sentimental Bloke. Angus & Robertson: Sydney)
- Christopher Brennan (Note: Brennan, Christopher (1918) A Chant of Doom and Other Verses. Angus and Robertson: Sydney)
- Edward Dyson
- Henry Lawson (Note: Lawson, Henry (1916) Song of the Dardanelles and Other Verses. George G. Harrap & Company: London)
- John Le Gay Brereton (Note: Le Gay Brereton, John (2012) 73 Poems. PoemHunter.com – The World’s Poetry Archive: (NC))
- Leonard Nelson (Note: Nelson, Leonard (1918) Dinky-Di Soldier and Other Jingles. Tyrrell’s Limited: Sydney)
- John Sandes, writing as "Oriel" and many more.

== Civilian women ==
There were a number of woman poets, however, they garnered less attention and have been largely loss to time. Their works were often published in newspapers or in small numbers. Mary Gilmore is considered arguably the most well-known of them.

- Agnes Rose-Soley (Note: Rose-Soley, Agnes (1923) Stray Chords. Tyrrell’s Limited: Sydney)
- Agnes Littlejohn (Note: Littlejohn, Agnus (July 1915) Patriotic Poems. (NP): (NC) & Littlejohn, Agnus (Jan 1915) Lyrical Poems. Harry Gorton: Sydney & Littlejohn, Agnus (1916) War Poems. Vale & Pearson: Sydney)
- Alice Gore-Jones (Note: Gore-Jones, A. (1917) Troop Trains and Other Verses. G. Hassell & Son: Adelaide)
- Capel Boake
- Dorothea McKellar
- Dorothy Frances McCrae (Note: McCrae, Dorothy Frances (ND) The Clear Call. George Robertson & Company: Melbourne & McCrae, Dorothy Frances (ND) Soldier my Soldier! George Robertson & Company: Melbourne)
- Ella McFadyen
- Esther Nea-Smith
- Grace Ethel Martyr,
- Joan Torrance (Note: Torrance, Joan (ND) Sons of the Southern Sea. Francis, Day & Hunter: London)
- Madoline 'Nina' Murdoch (Note: Murdoch, Nina (1915) Songs of the Open Air. William Brooks & Co.: Sydney & Murdoch, Nina (1922) More Songs of the Open Air. Robertson & Mullens: Melbourne)
- Margery Ruth Betts (Note: Betts, Margery Ruth (1917) Remembering and Other Verse. Australian Authors’ Agency: Melbourne)
- Marion Knowles
- Mary Gilmore
- May Kidson (Note: Kidson, May (1918) Memory’s Voices. Returned Serviceman’s Association: Perth)
- Philadelphia N. Robertson (Note: Robertson, Philadelphia N. (ND) An Anzac Budget and Other Verses. Australian Authors’ Agency: (NC)) and many others.

== Foreign pro-Australia ==
- Arthur St. John Adcock
- Lance Corporal Cobber
- C. Fox Smith
- Edgar Wallace
- Ethel Campbell
- Henry Newbolt
- Jessie Pope
- Sylvia Hobday.

== Prediction poets ==
Henry Lawson (Note: Lawson, Henry (1916) Song of the Dardanelles and Other Verses. George G. Harrap & Company: London) and William Wentworth to name only two. There are several.
