= Law of Gibraltar =

The law of Gibraltar is the legal system of Gibraltar, a self-governing British Overseas Territory. It is a common law system based heavily on English law, comprising both received English common law and statutes enacted locally.

The English Law (Application) Act 1962 provides that English common law applies in Gibraltar unless overridden by Gibraltar legislation. Because Gibraltar is self-governing, it maintains its own independent tax status, and its legislature, the Gibraltar Parliament, can enact laws independently of the United Kingdom. The territory's written constitution is contained in the Gibraltar Constitution Order 2006.

Gibraltar has its own hierarchy of courts, with final appeals lying to the Judicial Committee of the Privy Council in London. The legal profession is a fused profession of barristers and solicitors.

== Constitution ==
Gibraltar's written constitution is set out in the Gibraltar Constitution Order 2006, an Order in Council that replaced the earlier Gibraltar Constitution Order 1969. The new constitution was approved in a referendum held on 30 November 2006, made by Order in Council on 14 December 2006, and came into force on 2 January 2007. Its stated aim was to provide a modern, non-colonial relationship between Gibraltar and the United Kingdom, while leaving the question of sovereignty unaffected and the United Kingdom responsible for the territory's external relations.

The constitution is arranged in chapters that, among other things, entrench a bill of rights of fundamental rights and freedoms, establish the office of Governor, provide for the legislature (renaming the House of Assembly as the Gibraltar Parliament) and the executive, and set out the judicature, including the Supreme Court and the Court of Appeal for Gibraltar, with a right of final appeal to the Judicial Committee of the Privy Council. It can be amended only through a referendum together with a vote of the Parliament.

== Legislation ==
The legislature is the Gibraltar Parliament (formerly called the House of Assembly). It replaced the Gibraltar Legislative Council which replaced the Governor-in-Council.

The gazette is the Gibraltar Gazette.

=== List of legislation ===
==== Ordinances ====
- The Census of Population Ordinance, Gibraltar, 1868 (No 2)
- The Press Ordinance, Gibraltar, 1869 (No 1)
- The Governor's Salary Ordinance 1873 (No 1)
- The Foreign Recruiting Ordinance 1876 (No 1 of 1877)
- The Extradition Ordinance, Gibraltar, 1877 (No 2)
- The Exportation of Arms Ordinance 1878 (No 1)
- Dog Ordinance, Gibraltar, 1880 (No 1)
- The Petty Debt Ordinance, Gibraltar, 1881 (No 1)
- The Forgery of Money Orders Ordinance, Gibraltar, 1882 (No 1)
- The Stamp Ordinance, Gibraltar, 1882 (No 2)
- The Trespass Ordinance, Gibraltar, 1883 (No 1)
- The Gibraltar Market Ordinance 1883 (No 2)
- The Petroleum Ordinance, Gibraltar, 1884 (No 1)

==== Acts of the Gibraltar Legislative Council ====
- The English Law (Application) Act 1962

== Cases and reports ==
Collections of law reports include:

- The Gibraltar Law Reports. These reports cover cases from a period that begins in 1812. For the purpose of citation, the name of these reports may be abbreviated to "Gib LR".

== Courts and judiciary ==
Gibraltar has its own hierarchy of courts. The senior courts are the Court of Appeal for Gibraltar and the Supreme Court of Gibraltar, the latter headed by the Chief Justice; below them sit the Magistrates' Court and the Coroner's Court. The highest court of appeal is the Judicial Committee of the Privy Council in London, which hears appeals from the Court of Appeal.

== Legal practitioners ==
There is a fused profession. It has two branches, barristers and solicitors. The two branches are not separate, have identical rights of audience, can both be approached directly by clients, and can both be members of firms. The Gibraltar Bar Council replaced the Gibraltar Bar Association (or Bar Association of Gibraltar).

== Criminal law ==
As to the criminal law of Gibraltar generally, see the Crimes Act 2011 (No 2011–23). This Act repealed and replaced the Criminal Offences Act (No 1960–17), the Drugs (Misuse) Act (No 1973–06), the Crimes (Computer Hacking) Act 2009 (No 2009–44), the Dangerous Dogs Act 2003 (No 2003–03), and the Crimes (Indecent Photographs with Children) Act 2009 (No 2009–40).

As to criminal procedure in Gibraltar, see the Criminal Procedure and Evidence Act 2011 (No 2011–24). This Act repealed and replaced the Criminal Procedure Act (No 1961–24) and the Crimes (Vulnerable Witnesses) Act 2009 (No 2009–34).

As to extradition, see the Extradition Act 2018 (No 2018–29) and the Extradition Arrest Warrant Act 2004 (No 2004–04). As to the return of fugitive offenders, see the Fugitive Offenders Act 2002 (No 2002–15).

As to the proceeds of crime, see the Proceeds of Crime Act 2015 (No 2015–22). As to drug trafficking offences, see the Drug Trafficking Offences Act (No 1995–06). As to criminal libel, see Part V of the Defamation Act (No 1960–36).

== Taxation ==
As to income tax, see the Income Tax Act 2010 (No 2010–21). This Act repealed and replaced the Companies (Taxations and Concessions) Act 1983 (No 1983–13) and the Income Tax Act 1952 (No 1952–11), except section 41A. As to social insurance contributions, see the Social Security (Insurance) Act (No 1955–14). As to stamp duties, see the Stamp Duties Act 2005 (No 2005–73). As to import duty, see Part V of the Imports and Exports Act 1986 (No 1986–21).

As to the implementation of the Convention on Mutual Administrative Assistance in Tax Matters, see the Taxation (Mutual Administrative Assistance) Act 2014 (No 2014–06).

== See also ==
- Government of Gibraltar

== Bibliography ==
- Guide to Law Online: Gibraltar. The Library of Congress.
- Gibraltar. WorldLII.
- Ian Hendry and Susan Dickson. "Gibraltar". British Overseas Territories Law. Second Edition. Hart Publishing. 2018. Pages 346 to 349. See also pages 1, 2, 10, 20, 27, 31, 34, 46, 48, 58, 61, 65 to 69, 72, 73, 79, 84, 85, 87, 100, 102, 103, 105, 107, 109 to 112, 114, 115, 119, 122, 123, 125 to 127, 129, 133, 137, 139, 140, 146, 147, 149, 153, 154, 157, 158, 166, 168, 170, 173, 175, 178, 180 to 182, 187, 188, 201, 204, 206, 214, 222, 223, 228, 230 to 232, 234 to 236, 239, 243, 252, 263, 264, 286, 287, 296, 297 and 302.
- "Gibraltar" in "Modes of Legislation in the British Colonies" (1897) 1 Journal of the Society of Comparative Legislation 144 to 146
- C E A Bedwell (ed). "Gibraltar". The Legislation of the Empire. Butterworth & Co. 1909. Volume 3. Pages 519 to 522.
- S Gatty, "Gibraltar" in "Review of the Legislation of the British Empire in 1895" (1897) 1 Journal of the Society of Comparative Legislation 12 and 13
- S Gatty, "Gibraltar" in "Review of the Legislation of the British Empire in 1896" (1897) 2 Journal of the Society of Comparative Legislation 148. See also page xii.
- Albert Gray, "Gibraltar" (1903) 5 Journal of the Society of Comparative Legislation 457
- The Gibraltar Law Reports.
  - John Farley Spry (ed). The Gibraltar Law Reports 1812–1977. Charles G Trico. (Trico Printers). Gibraltar. 1980.
  - The Gibraltar Law Reports 1978. Google.
  - The Gibraltar Law Reports 1979. Google.
- Roger Sewell Bacon. A History of the Courts of Gibraltar (1704–1951). Supreme Court. Gibraltar. 1951.
- "Judicial System". The Europa World Year Book 2004. Europa Publications. 2004. Volume 2. Page 4471.
- Robert French Sheriff. The Consolidated Laws of Gibraltar. Stevens and Sons. London. 1890. Google.
- "Gibraltar". The Statutory Rules and Orders and Statutory Instruments Revised to December 31, 1948. HMSO. 1951. Volume 9. Pages 609 to 654.
- Annual Report on Gibraltar
  - "Legislation" and "Justice, Police and Prisons". Annual Report on Gibraltar for the Year 1946. HMSO. 1947. Chapters 8 and 9. Pages 31 to 38.
- Dennis C Benamati. "Gibraltar". Newman (ed). Crime and Punishment around the World. ABC-CLIO. 2010. Volume 4. Pages 132 to 137. Google.
- James Levy and Simon Caplan. Tolley's Taxation in Gibraltar 1981-1982. (Tolley's Taxation in Gibraltar). Tolley. Croydon. 1982. See trust and company law chapter.
- T J Revill. Gibraltar: International Tax Planning. Longman. London. 1986. See trust and company law chapters.
- Keith Azopardi. "The Nature of Acquisition and the Assertion of Jurisdiction". Sovereignty and the Stateless Nation: Gibraltar in the Modern Legal Context. (Studies in International Law, volume 24). Hart Publishing. 2009. Pages 25 to 27. "Gibraltar" in "Table of Legislation" at pages xxvii to xxx. "Gibraltar" in "Table of Cases" at page xix.
- Michell Walsh Hassans. "Gibraltar". Post-Employment Covenants in Employment Relationships. (Comparative Law Yearbook of International Business). Wolters Kluwer Law & Business. 2014.
- Stephen V Cantania. "Gibraltar". Damian Taylor (ed). The Dispute Resolution Review. Ninth Edition. Law Business Research. 2017. Chapter 14.
- Charles Simpson. "Gibraltar". James Stewart (ed). Family Law: Jurisdictional Comparisons. Sweet & Maxwell. 2011. Pages 143 to 158.
- Charles Simpson. "Gibraltar". Collins, Kempster, McMillan and Meek (eds). International Trust Disputes. Oxford University Press. 2012. Chapter 25.
- Peter A Isola and Adrian Pilcher. "Gibraltar". John Rhodes (ed). Private Client Tax: Jurisdictional Comparisons. Second Edition. Sweet & Maxwell. 2012. Page 113 to 129.
- "Gibraltar". Outsourcing Legal Services: Impact on National Law Practices. The Comparative Law Yearbook of International Business. Wolters Kluwer Law & Business. 2012.
- Archer. Gibraltar, Identity and Empire. 2006. Page 77.
