= Solicitor General of Grenada =

The Solicitor-General of Grenada is a law officer of the government for Grenada, subordinate to the Attorney-General of Grenada. The office is one of the members of the government. The Solicitor General could also be a member of the General Assembly.

== List of Solicitors-General of Grenada ==
- 1771–1781 John Stanley
- 1774–1779 Sir Ashton Warner Byam. (appointed 9 June 1774, then Attorney-General 1783–1789)
- 1774 Thomas Baker (previously Attorney General)
- 1842 William Snagg (appointed 23 February 1842, later Governor)
- 1960–1979 Nolan Jacobs
- Dwight Horsford (2013–2018)
- Dia Forrester (8 April 2019 – 2020)
- Karen Reid-Ballantyne (1 April 2021–Present)
