= May Kidson =

Bahamian-Australian poet and songwriter (1858-1942)

- Born: 30 September 1858
- Died: 9 August 1942
- Occupations: Poet, songwriter

Mary Amelia "May" Kidson (1858–1942) was a Bahamian-Australian poet and songwriter. Mary and her mother moved to Western Australia after the death of her father, Sir William H. Doyle. Kidson published under the names M.K. and May Kidson. She was the author of at least 52 works, her most well-known collection being "Memory's Voices". Kidson was a regular contributor to newspapers and magazines in Western Australia, particularly during World War I and the decade that followed. She and Charles F. J. North also published some songs, with Kidson's lyrics and North's music.

== Biography ==
Mary Amelia Doyle was born in 1858 in Nassau, Bahamas, the daughter of Sir William Henry Doyle and his wife Mary Johnson. Sir William was a Bahamian lawyer and Member of Parliament who became Chief Justice of the Bahamas (1865–1875) and later Chief Justice of the Leeward Islands (1875) and Chief Justice of Gibraltar (1877–1879). Following her father's death in 1879, Mary and her mother, Lady Doyle, moved to Western Australia in 1886 where her cousin, Francis A. Moseley, was the Registrar of Titles, later the Master of the Supreme Court.

In 1888, Mary married Charles Barclay Kidson. He was a judge's associate and later became the first Sergeant-at-Arms of the Legislative Assembly of Western Australia. His brother was Alfred Bowman Kidson.

Mary and Charles had two sons, Noel Doyle Kidson (b. 1888) and Edric Doyle Kidson (b. 1893). Both boys enlisted in the early days of World War I and were part of the forces that landed at Gallipoli. Edric died during the Gallipoli landing in April 1915 and Noel was injured.

Kidson died in Cottesloe on 9 August 1942; she was 84.

== Career ==
Kidson published under the names M.K. and May Kidson. She was the author of at least 52 works. Kidson was a regular contributor to newspapers and magazines in Western Australia, particularly during WWI and the 1920s.

In 1939, the Sunday Times (Perth) wrote "There are many people in Western Australia who have known and loved the delightful poetry from May Kidson's pen, and. who have admired the forceful verse which she wrote during the war years. Her work has created a bond of friendship, intangible perhaps, but one which has bound her to our shores and hearts as a poet of our Western State."

One of her poems was presented to Queen Elizabeth when the latter was a baby. Another poem, Ode to Welcome, was presented to the Prince of Wales (later Edward VIII). Kidson received an acknowledgment from the prince's private secretary who revealed that the prince had also perused her collection, Memory's Voice, while staying at Government House.

== Published works ==
This following is an incomplete list of the works of May Kidson (please help by adding to it):

=== Songs ===
- Kitchener's Message to Australia - lyrics by May Kidson, music by Charles Frederick John North
- Memory Mine - lyrics by May Kidson, music by Charles J. F. North
- Your Love - lyrics by May Kidson, music by Charles J. F. North
- The Sower - lyrics by May Kidson, music by Charles J. F. North

=== Poetry ===
In 1918, Kidson released a book of poems called Memory's Voices, which was dedicated to her son Edric who had died in action, and included the poem You and I. Demand for the book was so high that a second print run was ordered.

Kidson was also a regular contributor to newspapers and magazines. The following are some of her contributions:

- The Mother's Battalion (1915)
- Faith's Crown (1916)
- America To-day (1917)
- Granma's Kiddie (1918)
- Just Baby (1919)
- Baby's Photograph: A Mother's Rhyme (1920)
- The New Memory (1921)
- The Immigrant (1921)
- Wedding Blossoms (1921)
- The Mother's Prayer (1922)
- Music at Life's Millstones (1923)
- Words (1925)
- Sunbeams (1927)
- Soul of Dawning (1933)
- The Unknown Way (1933)
- The Last Boy May Count (1933), which was approved by Lord Baden Powell
- The Woman's Victoria Cross (1937)
- Voices, A Reverie (1941)
- When Memory Calls (1941)
- Ageless (1941)
- The Larger Day (1942)
- The Bush Message

== Bibliography ==
- Austlit. "May Kidson | AustLit: Discover Australian Stories". www.austlit.edu.au. Retrieved 2025-04-21.
- "Our Westralian Poetess", Sunday Times (Perth, Western Australia), Sunday, 10 Oct 1926, Page 36
