= Henry Ludlow =

Henry Ludlow may refer to:

- Henry Ludlow (died 1639) (1577–1639), English MP
- Henry Ludlow (died 1643) (1592–1643), English MP
- Sir Henry Ludlow (judge) (1834–1903), English barrister and judge
- Henry G. Ludlow (1797–1867), American minister and abolitionist
