= Anthony Dudley =

Anthony Dudley may refer to:

- Anthony Dudley (judge)
- Anthony Dudley (footballer)
