= Derek Schofield =

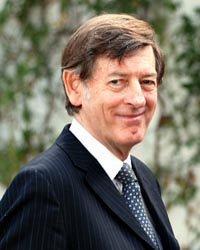
- Derek Schofield

Chief Justice of the Supreme Court of Gibraltar
- In office 8 February 1996 – 17 November 2009
- Appointed by: Governor of Gibraltar Sir Hugo White
- Succeeded by: Anthony Dudley

Personal details
- Born: 20 February 1945 (age 81)
- Spouse: Anne Schofield
- Children: 4
- Occupation: Lawyer
- Profession: Judge

Derek Schofield (born 20 February 1945), is a British lawyer and the former Chief Justice of Gibraltar.

== Biography ==
He commenced his legal career in 1961 when he was appointed assistant in the office of the clerk of the court in Lancashire. He was called to the bar in 1970, at Gray's Inn in London. Served as Deputy Clerk to the Justices Uxbridge Magistrate's Court from 1972 to 1974. Was appointed a resident magistrate in Kenya in 1974 and served are Senior Magistrate in Mombasa. Appointed Hiugh Court Judge in Kenya in 1982 to 1987.

He served as a Grand Court Judge in the Cayman Islands from 1988 to 1996.

He is known for his strong support of human rights and the independence of the judiciary which led him to resign as High Court judge and leave Kenya with his family in 1987 when a case he was dealing involving arrest and shooting of a suspect was taken away from him by the Chief Justcie the late Chief Justice Miller after interferance by the late President Moi.

He was sappointed Chief Justice of Gibraltar in 1996 and a Recorder in the South Eastern Circuit of England in 1997.

During his term as Chief Justice of the Supreme Court of Gibraltar, he made several significant decisions, including the ruling that it is unconstitutional for jury service to be compulsory only for men. The decision was reversed on appeal and then went to the Privy Council, who overturned the Gibraltar Government objection of equality for women in jury service.

On 17 September 2007 Schofield was suspended on full pay pending the inquiry into his removal from office. It has been reported that at one earlier moment in time he was offered full remuneration until his retirement in return for his resignation, but that he declined this offer.

He retired as a Recorder in 2015.

== Tribunal ==
A tribunal was convened in Gibraltar, chaired by Lord Cullen with Sir Peter Gibson and Sir Jonathan Parker, to determine whether to refer his appointment to the Privy Council. The full Inquiry report, which recommended that his appointment should be reviewed, along with the daily transcript and other documents regarding the dispute is available from the Gibraltar Chronicle document repository site.

There are mixed views over the report of the tribunal, which it is claimed went further than its mandate and made a string of assumptions which it is claimed "show how little grasp of the local social and political situation the three judges actually had."

On 18 November 2008 the Governor of Gibraltar released a statement that he had referred the case to the Judicial Committee of the Privy Council.

== Privy Council ==
The Privy Council cancelled the original hearing of this matter which was scheduled for 27–29 January 2009.

In June 2009 of the Privy Council considered the matter. The Governor was represented by Tim Otty QC, the Government of Gibraltar by James Eady QC, the Gibraltar lawyers who complained appeared as litigants in person, by Robert Vasquez of Triay & Triay, lawyers in Gibraltar. Chief Justice Schofield was represented by the Hon Michael Beloff QC from Blackstone Chambers and Paul Stanley from Essex Court Chambers and briefed by Charles Gomez from Gibraltar.

On 12 November 2009 the Privy Council judgement was released in which by a 4:3 majority they supported the removal of the Chief Justice from office.

== Removal from office ==
On 17 November 2009 the following notice was issued:

"Acting on the advice received from the Judicial Service Commission, HE The Governor, Sir Adrian Johns, has today carried out the removal by means of dismissal of Mr Justice Schofield from the office of Chief Justice."

== See also ==
- Court system of Gibraltar
- Chief Justice of Gibraltar
