= Thomas Cochran (Nova Scotia politician) =

Irish-born politician (1733–1801)

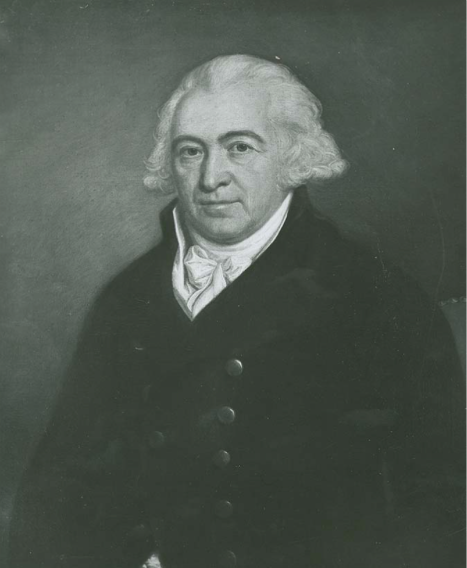

Speaker of the Nova Scotia House of Assembly
- In office November 1784 – October 1785
- Preceded by: William Nesbitt
- Succeeded by: Sampson Salter Blowers

Member of the Nova Scotia House of Assembly
- In office 1775–1785

Personal details
- Born: 1733; Ireland
- Died: 28 July 1801 (aged 67–68); Halifax, Nova Scotia
- Spouse: Augusta Jane Allan (m. 1775)
- Relations: William Cochran (brother)
- Parent: Joseph Cochran

Thomas Cochran or Cochrane (1733 – July 28, 1801) was an Irish-born merchant and political figure in Nova Scotia. He represented Liverpool Township in the Nova Scotia House of Assembly from 1775 to 1785.

== Early life ==
He was the son of Joseph Cochran. His brother William also served in the provincial assembly.

== Career ==
From 1775 to 1785, Cochran represented Liverpool Township in the Nova Scotia House of Assembly, serving as speaker for the provincial assembly from November 1784 to October 1785. He was named to the Nova Scotia Council in June 1785 and served until his death in 1801.

== Personal life ==
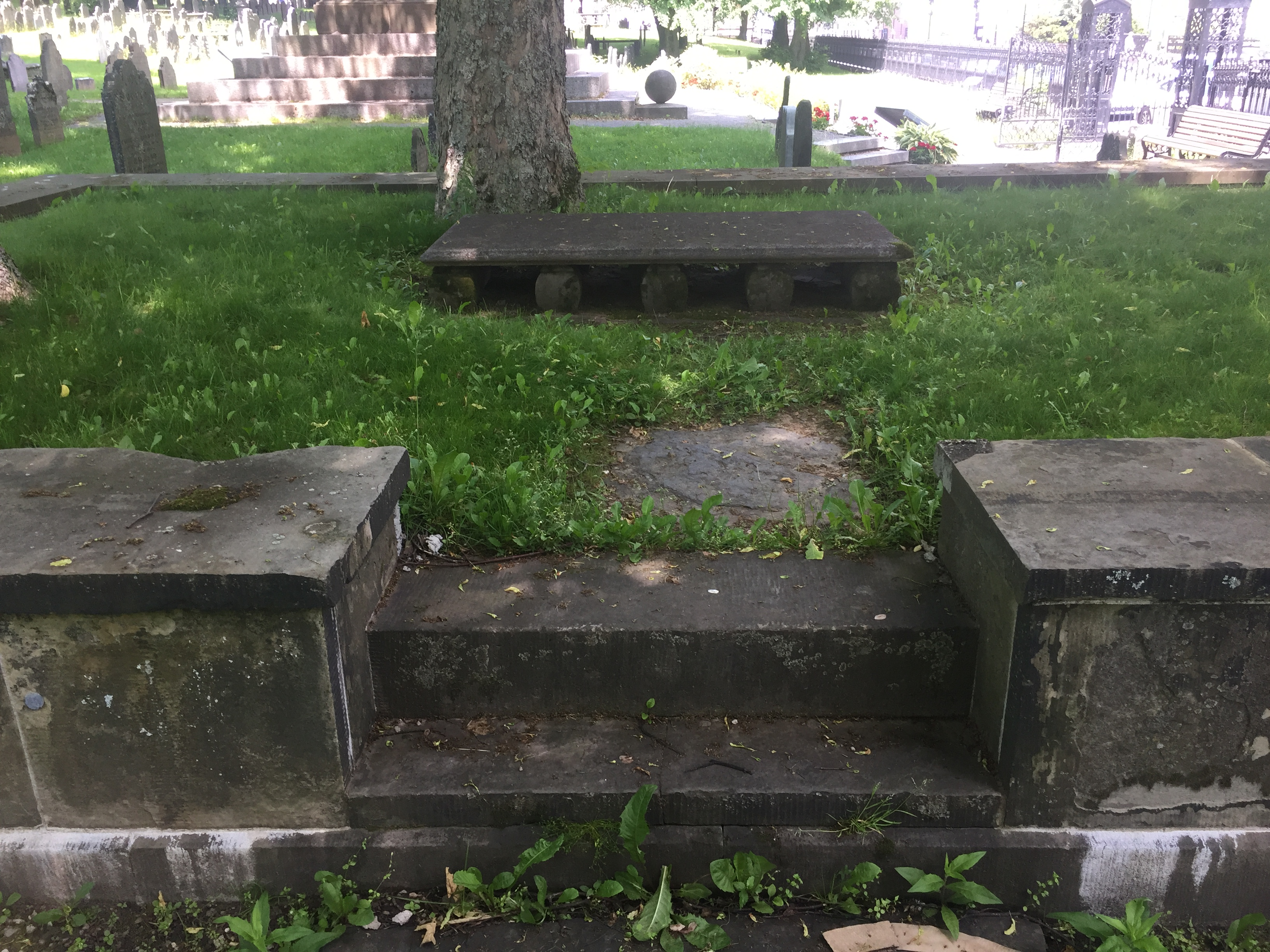
Thomas Cochran and his family, Old Burying Ground (Halifax, Nova Scotia)

With his first wife, he was a father of:

- Margaret Cochran (c. 1762–c. 1835), who married Sir Rupert George, the Commodore for the Royal Navy's North America Station.

In 1775, he married his second wife, Augusta Jane Allan (1759–1826), a daughter of Major William Allan and Isabella (née Maxwell) Allan. His brothers-in-law included John Allan and the Honorable Charles Hill. Together with his second wife, he was the father of several more children:

- Thomas Cochran (1777–1804), who served as the third Chief Justice of Prince Edward Island and later in Upper Canada where he perished in Lake Ontario in 1804.
- Joseph Cochran (1779–1811)
- Elizabeth Cochran (1781–1862), who married Rt. Rev. John Inglis, Bishop of Nova Scotia, and son of Charles Inglis, the first Anglican bishop in North America.
- Isabella Cochran (1784–1858), who married Dean Edward Bannerman Ramsay of Edinburgh, brother of Admiral Sir William Ramsay, in 1829.
- Harriet A. Cochran (1781–1862)
- Lt.-Gen. William George Cochrane (1788–1858)
- Georgiana Cochran (b. 1789)
- Sir James Cochrane (1790–1883), the Chief Justice of Gibraltar who married Ann Theresa Elizabeth Haly, daughter of Col. William Haly, Lt. Gov. of Newfoundland.
- Rupert John Cochrane (1791–1851), who married Isabella Macomb Clarke.

Cochran died in Halifax on 28 July 1801. Cochran and his family are buried in the Old Burying Ground in Halifax.
