= English Law (Application) Act 1962 =

Law of Gibraltar

English Law (Application) Act
- Act of the Gibraltar Parliament
- Parliament of Gibraltar
- Long title: An Act to declare the extent to which English law is in force in Gibraltar
- Citation: Act No. 1962-17
- Territorial extent: Gibraltar

Dates
- Governor's assent: 31 May 1962 (Governor's assent, Granted by the Governor of Gibraltar)
- Commencement: 1 June 1962

Other legislation
- Amended by: Crimes Act 2011 (2011-23), 23 November 2012; Wills Act 2009 (2009-25), 9 July 2009

Status: Current legislation

Text of statute as originally enacted

The English Law (Application) Act 1962, originally known as the Application of English Law Ordinance, is an Act of the Gibraltar Legislative Council concerning the applicability of English law in Gibraltar.

== Law ==
The Ordinance affirmed that Gibraltar would follow English Common Law and defined in schedules which specific statutes of English law would apply in Gibraltar. The list of statutes would be updated infrequently. It was also done to confirm in statute, rather than implied common automatic supersession, that Gibraltar would continue with English law.

Though the Ordinance did not clarify whether Gibraltar would follow English case law precedents, it was later interpreted by Gibraltarian legal practitioners as meaning that they were not binding but were useful starting points for the consideration of judgments, due to the low amount of case law that originated in Gibraltar.

The Ordinance was later used as a model in other British colonies for similar ordinances. In British Hong Kong, it was used as the basis for the Application of English Law Ordinance 1966. It is believed that the Hong Kong ordinance was drafted based upon Gibraltar's due to the Attorney General of Hong Kong Denys Roberts supplying a copy of Gibraltar's ordinance which he had from when he was the Attorney General of Gibraltar in 1962. In 2012, the National Assembly for Wales investigated the possibility of creating a system of Welsh law separate from English law, and a barrister responding to the proposal referred to the English Law (Application) Act 1962 and found it ambiguous.

== Repeals ==
While the Act confirmed many English offences, others were not confirmed, and the Act also made provision for the Gibraltar Parliament to amend or disapply any relevant legislation. As a result, some common law criminal offences have been abolished in Gibraltar, such as being a common scold, cheating the public revenue, champerty, and larceny. And at civil law, adultery and seduction were no longer to be causes of action.
