= Henry Rawlins Pipon Schooles =

Chief Justice of Gibraltar

Sir Henry Rawlins Pipon Schooles (1849 – 7 December 1913) was an English lawyer who was the Attorney General of Jamaica and later Chief Justice of Gibraltar from July 1905.

He was born in Malta, the eldest son of Army surgeon Henry James Schooles and his wife Catherine Semper of St Kitts.

He moved to live in the West Indies, where he became Attorney General of the Leeward Islands in 1870. He was called to the bar in 1873 and worked as a barrister in St Kitts, also representing Sandypoint in the St Kitts Legislative Assembly. He moved again to become Attorney-General of British Honduras from 1880 to 1883.

From 1883 to 1896 he was Attorney General of Grenada, also serving as Administrator of Grenada from 1887 to 1888 and for short periods in 1891 and 1894. He was afterwards appointed Attorney General of Jamaica from 1896 to 1905. Knighted in 1905 on his return to Europe his final post was that of Chief Justice of the Supreme Court of Gibraltar.

A few days before his death in 1913 he was invested as a Knight of Grace of the Order of the Hospital of St John Of Jerusalem. He died in Farnborough, Hampshire and was survived by his wife Caroline, the daughter of Sir William Keid.
