= Audley McKisack =

Irish barrister and judge

Sir Audley McKisack QC (2 April 1903 – 16 August 1966) was an Irish barrister and judge who ended a distinguished legal career as President of the High Court of the Federation of South Arabia and Judge in the Court of Appeal of the Bahamas and Bermuda.

== Biography ==
McKisack was born in Craigavad, County Down, Ireland (now Northern Ireland), the only son of Audley John and Elizabeth McKisack. His elder sister was the historian May McKisack (1900–1981). He was educated at Bedford School and at University College, Oxford. He entered the Colonial Service in 1924 and was an Administrative Officer in Northern Rhodesia between 1924 and 1936. He was called to the Bar in 1935, and became a member of the Inner Temple.

He was Crown Counsel in Uganda between 1938 and 1944, and was appointed Attorney General of Gibraltar in 1944. He was appointed as Secretary to the Ministry of Justice of the Gold Coast in 1950, and was Attorney General of Nigeria between 1951 and 1956.

He was Chief Justice of Uganda between 1956 and 1962, President of the High Court of the Federation of South Arabia between 1964 and 1966, and Judge in the Court of Appeal of the Bahamas and Bermuda between 1965 and 1966.

He died in Midhurst, Sussex, aged 63.
