= John Baker (barrister) =

English barrister (1712–1779)

John Baker (1712–1779) was an English barrister, known also as a diarist. He was Attorney General of the Leeward Islands in the 1750s, and a plantation owner on St Kitts.

== Life ==
He was the second son of Thomas Baker of Chichester (1682–1748), a grocer, and his wife Martha Short of Exeter. His father's brother Robert was a barber surgeon in London, and two of his brothers—Thomas Baker (1710–1770) at St Thomas's Hospital and Joseph (1714–1791) who became mayor of Chichester—were also surgeons.

Baker was at school in Petworth from 1723 to 1727. He entered Middle Temple in 1729, and was called to the bar in 1737.

Nicholas Tuite (1705–1772), a slave-owner on Montserrat who moved to Saint Croix, was a good friend of Baker. Legacies of British Slavery infers details of an estate that Baker owned on St Kitts. Orla Power writes that Baker was not himself able to finance purchase of a plantation: in 1751 through Tuite he was offered a share in one, on easy terms. Baker and Tuite visited Denmark, the Netherlands and Germany together. They were in Copenhagen in 1760. Baker's diary for 22 August records meetings in Copenhagen on a visit to Frederiksberg: with Johann Rudolf Iselin, Adam Gottlob Moltke, Johan Ludvig Holstein and Philipp Conrad Fabricius; and, at the levee of Frederick V of Denmark, the French ambassador Jean-François Ogier.

== Diary ==
Baker's diary, as it survives, was published in 1931, edited by Philip Chesney Yorke. The extant portion of Baker's diary starts in December 1751, the entries running to 30 December 1778, when he had less than three months to live. To his return to England in 1757, what is written is intermittent and generally concise.

On 3 December 1772 Baker was in Bath. He records visits to the artist studios of William Hoare and Thomas Gainsborough, recording society figures encountered (Robert Nugent, 1st Earl Nugent, Charles Pratt, 1st Earl Camden, Sir John Moore, 1st Baronet) rather than artworks, excepting in relation to Elizabeth Ann Linley and her unwanted, married admirer Thomas Mathews.

== Family ==
Baker was twice married. His first wife Elizabeth was buried on St Kitts in 1745. There was a son of this marriage, John Proculus Baker. He matriculated at Hertford College, Oxford in 1758. He married in 1773 Ann Susanna Pool, daughter of the Rev. John Pool. John Pool(e), aged 61 in 1774, acted as attorney in Jamaica for absentee planted, and had reputedly made a fortune.

Baker married, secondly, Mary Ryan (died 1774), elder daughter of Thomas Ryan (died 1755) of Montserrat, with whom he had a family of five sons and two daughters. Mary was Catholic, and the elder daughter, Martha (1747–1809), was given a Catholic upbringing and education definitively from 1763. It proceeded after the end of the Seven Years' War at a convent of the Ursulines in Lille, and then shortly afterwards at another Ursuline convent, on Rue Saint-Jacques, Paris.

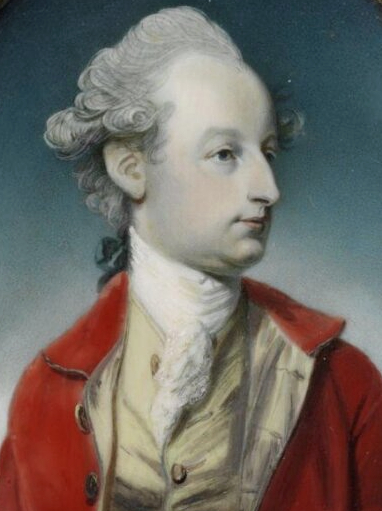
Henry Swinburne, portrait miniature (detail), 1775 to 1780

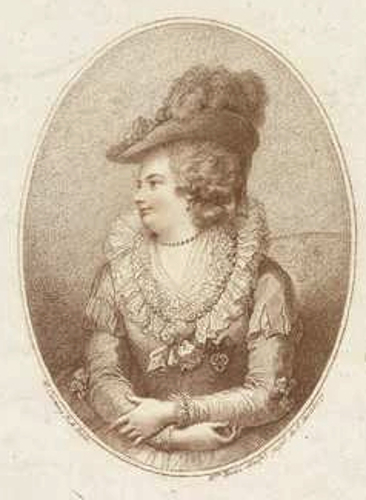
Martha Swinburne, 1786 engraving

Martha Baker met in Paris Henry Swinburne, of an old recusant family, who was taking a version of the Grand Tour. They were married in 1767, in Aix-la-Chapelle. They had a family of four sons and six daughters. Martha shared after her father's death in 1779 in his West Indian property, but the Anglo-French War by then being fought in the Caribbean made it worthless. Henry Swinburne pursued legal action and used influence with Marie-Antoinette to try to redress the position. Martha at her death had a share in an estate on St Vincent.

Christopher Hewetson, the Irish sculptor in Rome, made a bronze bust of Martha Swinburne c.1778.

Philip Chesney Yorke, who edited Baker's diary, was a descendant. He was a grandson of Rear-Admiral Reginald Yorke, and his wife Harriet Walker, daughter of John Walker of Purbrooke Park. Harriet Walker's mother was Maria Theresa Henrietta (Harriet) Swinburne, daughter of Henry and Martha Swinburne.
