= Daniel Thomas Tudor =

Sir Daniel Thomas Tudor Kt. KC (1866 – November 30, 1928) was an English jurist and colonial public servant.

== Early life and education ==
Born Daniel Thomas in Lampeter, South Wales. Thomas adopted the surname Tudor in July 1887. He was called to the bar at Gray's Inn in 1890 and practiced law on the Western Circuit until 1903.

== Career ==
Tudor's career then took him to the British West Indies, where he was appointed Attorney-General of Grenada and St. Vincent in 1908, a post he held until 1911. He also served at times as Acting Chief Justice and Acting Colonial Secretary for both territories.

In 1911, Tudor was appointed Commissioner to revise the laws of Grenada and also served as Legal Assistant to the Colonial Office in London. During World War I, Tudor served as President of the Discharged Soldiers' Commission.

From 1911 to 1922, he was the Chief Justice of the Supreme Court of the Bahama Islands.

Knighted in 1917, Tudor was appointed Chief Justice of Gibraltar in 1922. While in that role, Tudor suffered a stroke, prompting his return to England in 1926. He settled in Reigate before moving to Cheltenham.

== Death and legacy ==
Tudor died at his home in Cheltenham on 23 November 1928, marking the end of a distinguished career in law and public service. He was 62.

Predeceased by his wife, Hattie Josephine (née Thompson) Tudor in 1924, Sir Daniel Tudor was survived by three daughters.
