= Dia Forrester =

Grenadian lawyer

Dia C. Forrester is a Grenadian lawyer practising in St. Kitts & Nevis and Grenada. She served as Grenada’s first female Attorney General from January 2021 to June 2022. She has also held several prominent legal positions across the Eastern Caribbean, including Solicitor General of Grenada and partner at Daniel Brantley law firm in St. Kitts and Nevis.

== Early life and education ==
Forrester is the daughter of cultural activist Don Charles and celebrated female vocalist Agnes Forrester. She has a Bachelor of Laws with Honours from the University of the West Indies Cave Hill, a Legal Education Certificate of Merit from Hugh Wooding Law School and a Master of Laws in International Banking and Finance law from University College London. She was also a national table tennis player and OECS table tennis team champion.

== Career ==
Forrester was called to Grenada's Bar in 2008, and subsequently to the bars of Saint Kitts and Nevis and Anguilla in 2013. Her legal practice has encompassed banking and finance law, commercial and civil litigation, taxation, insolvency and intellectual property law. She has held positions on both the Grenada National Anti-doping Organisation and the Caribbean Regional Anti-Doping Organisation.

From 2017 to 2023, Forrester was a partner at Daniel Brantley law firm in St. Kitts and Nevis. In March 2020, she was named among the defendants in a lawsuit filed in Colorado by America 2030 Capital Limited, alleging corruption and breach of confidentiality against St Kitts and Nevis Foreign Affairs Minister Mark Brantley. The suit was dismissed on 7 May 2020.

Forrester served as Solicitor General of Grenada from April 2019 to December 2020, during which time she represented the government in negotiations and court proceedings. On 31 December 2020, she made history as the first woman to be appointed Attorney General of Grenada when Prime Minister Keith Mitchell selected her to replace the outgoing Darsham Ramdhani, who stepped down to serve as a judge. Following the opposition party's victory in Grenada's 2022 general election, Forrester was replaced as Attorney General by Claudette Joseph. She then served as an acting High Court Judge in the Eastern Caribbean in Antigua in January 2023 to February notably adjudicating several matters related to the 2023 Antigua & Barbuda General Elections and several commercial matters.

In August 2020, Forrester completed the inaugural Women in Politics Leadership Institute at the US Embassy in Barbados. She has also served as a local agent for Grenada's Citizenship by investment programme.

In 2024, Forrester established her own law firm, with practices in both Grenada and St. Kitts and Nevis.
