= Attorney General of the Leeward Islands =

The attorney general of the Leeward Islands was the chief law officer of the Leeward Islands. The British crown colony of the Leeward Islands, comprising Antigua, Barbuda, the British Virgin Islands, Montserrat, Saint Kitts, Nevis, Anguilla, and (to 1940) Dominica, existed as a political entity, under various names, from 1671 to 1958, when it became part of the West Indies Federation.

== List of attorneys general of the Leeward Islands ==
British Colony, 1671–1871

- 1688–1702 (or 1692) Archibald Hutcheson
- c.1713 John Yeamans
- 1751– John Baker
- 1754–1757 Harry Webb
- 1757–?1779 Thomas Warner (died 1779)
- 1779–?1780 William Leslie Hamilton (died 1780)
- 1781–1799 John Stanley
- c.1810 John Burke
- c.1820 Paul Horsford
- c.1830 Charles Thomson
- c.1840 William Lee

Federal Colony of the Leeward Islands, 1871–1956

- 1870– Henry Rawlins Pipon Schooles
- 1874–1877 Robert French Sheriff
- 1877–1878 Henry Spencer Berkeley (acting)
- 1878–1879 Henry James Burford Hancock
- 1880–1883 Sir John Tankerville Goldney
- 1883–1885 Stephen Herbert Gatty (afterwards Attorney General of Trinidad, 1886)
- 1886–1889 Charles Robert Tyser (later Chief Justice of Cyprus, 1906)
- 1889–1894 Charles George Walpole
- 1894–1898 Oliver Smith
- 1898–>1903 William Henry Stoker
- 1909–1917 Thomas Stafford Sidney
- 1927–1929 Harry Herbert Trusted (afterwards Attorney General of Cyprus, 1929)
- 1937–1938 Cecil Edgar Allan Rawle
- c.1945 Stanley Eugene Gomes, afterwards Chief Justice of Barbados, 1957
- ?–1957 Percival Cecil Lewis
- 1957–1959 Wilfred Ebenezer Jacobs
- Joined West Indies Federation, 1958
