= Henry Swinburne =

English travel writer

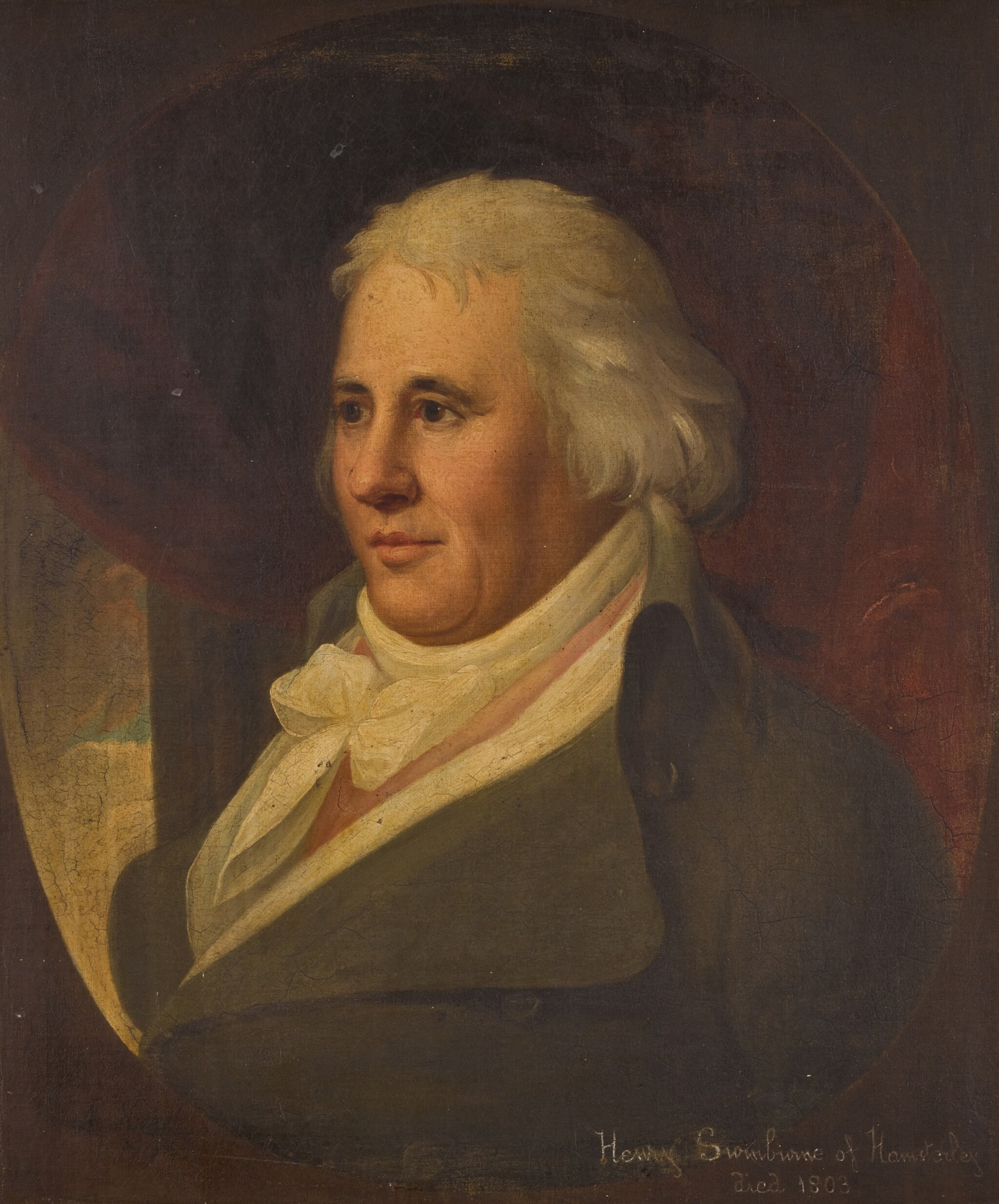
- portrait by Anton Hickel, 1794
- Born: 8 July 1743; Bristol, England
- Died: 1 April 1803 (aged 74); Trinidad, Trinidad and Tobago
- Occupation: Travel Writer

Henry Swinburne (1743–1803) was an English travel writer.

== Early life and marriage ==
He was born at Bristol on 8 July 1743, into a Catholic recusant family: he was the fourth son of Sir John Swinburne, 3rd Baronet of Capheaton, Northumberland, who married on 20 July 1721 Mary, only daughter of Edward Bedingfeld, and granddaughter of Sir Henry Bedingfeld of Oxburgh, Norfolk. His father died in January 1745, and his mother died at York on 7 February 1761. He was educated at Scorton school, near Catterick, Yorkshire. He was then sent to the monastic seminary of La Celle in France. He afterwards studied at Paris, Bordeaux, and in the Royal Academy at Turin, devoting special attention to literature and art. The death of his brother, who had devised to him a small estate at Hamsterley in Durham, placed him in independent circumstances. He proceeded to Turin, Genoa, and Florence.

Swinburne met in Paris his future wife Martha, daughter of John Baker (1712–1779) of Chichester, solicitor to the Leeward Islands, who was being educated at a convent of Ursuline nuns. They were married at Aix-la-Chapelle on 24 March 1767. The couple then settled at Hamsterley, where the husband laid out the estate.

== Travellers ==
They passed the autumn of 1774 and the following months until September 1775 at Bordeaux, and then visited the Pyrenees. Swinburne in the company of Sir Thomas Gascoigne travelled through Spain, returning to Bayonne in June 1776. A manuscript describing his journey was sent to Samuel Henley as editor. It was published in 1779 as Travels through Spain, 1775 and 1776, illustrated with drawings of Roman and Moorish architecture.

On his return to Bayonne in June 1776 Swinburne, with his family, travelled to Marseilles, and a supplementary volume describing the expedition was issued in 1787.

== The Anglo-French War (1778–1783) and aftermath ==
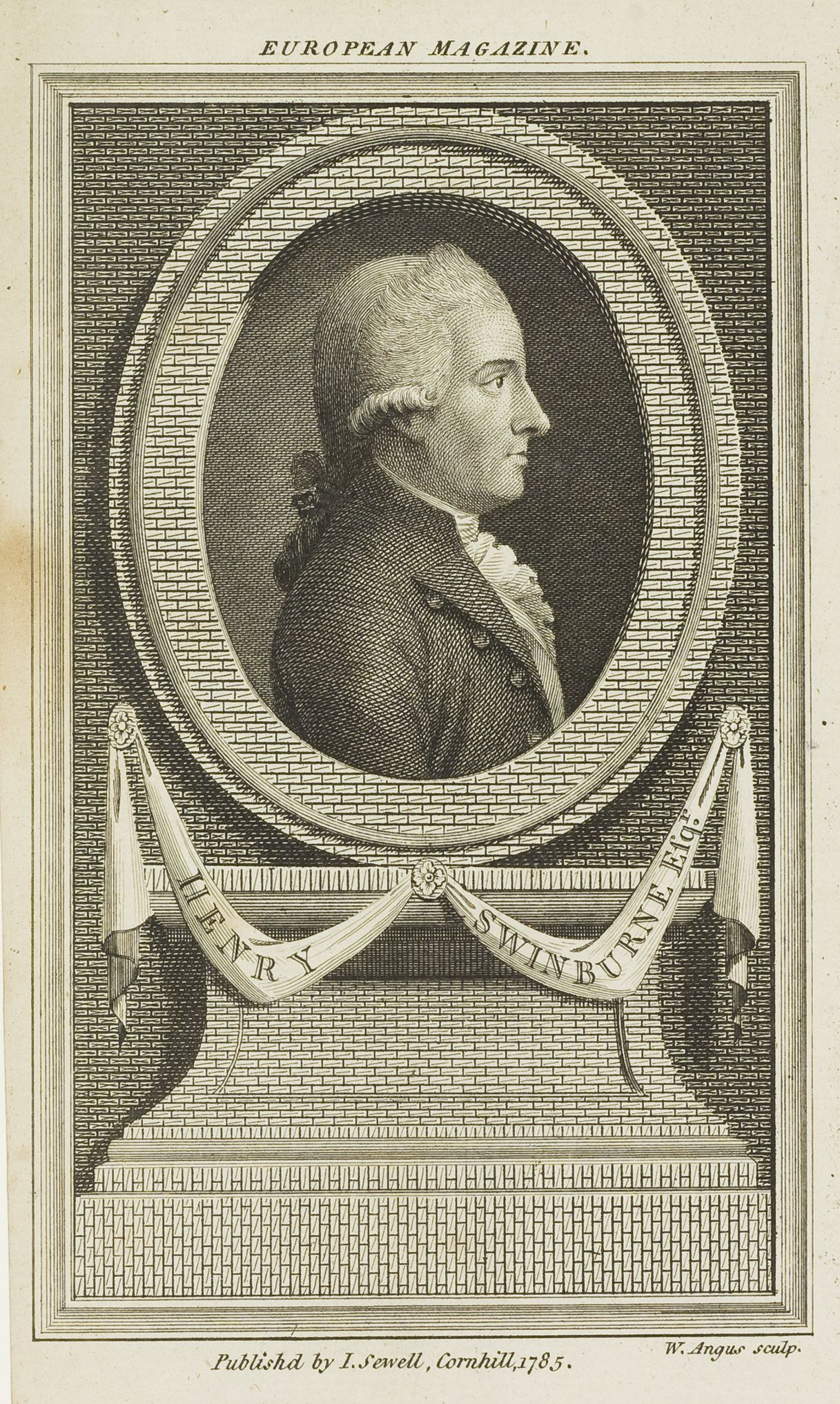
Henry Swinburne (European Magazine, 1785)

The Swinburnes then sailed to Naples, and travelled in the Two Sicilies, where they stayed for 1777 and 1778, and for the early months of 1779. Their return to England was by Vienna, Frankfurt, and Brussels, and they arrived in London in July 1779, but after a few months in England passed once more through France to Italy (March to July 1780) and then until November in Vienna. They formed acquaintance with literati in each country, and received compliments from the Catholic sovereigns. At Vienna Maria Theresa conferred on Mrs. Swinburne the female order of La Croix Étoilée, and the Emperor Joseph II stood godfather to their son of that name. They were in Brussels from February to June 1781, and again crossed to England.

By this time Martha's property in the West Indies had been laid waste. With letters of introduction to the French court, from Vienna, Swinburne went to Paris (1783), and through Marie-Antoinette' s influence obtained a grant of all uncultivated crown lands in the island of St. Vincent valued at £30,000. In February 1785 William Pitt offered half that sum for it, and on receiving a refusal passed through parliament a bill to impose heavy taxation upon the unproductive lands in all the West Indian islands. Swinburne then parted with his interest for £6,500. From September 1786 to June 1788 Swinburne was again in Paris, and high in favour with Marie-Antoinette.

== Later life ==
In the meantime Swinburne was sent to Paris in September 1796 as commissioner, to negotiate an exchange of prisoners with France, but, in the face of difficulties arising from the capture by the French of Sir Sidney Smith, was unsuccessful, and in December 1797 was recalled to England, In December 1801 he went out to the lucrative post of vendue-master in the newly ceded settlement of Trinidad, and also as commissioner to deliver up the Danish West Indian islands to a Danish official. He died from sunstroke at Trinidad on 1 April 1803, and was buried at San Juan, where his friend. Sir Ralph Woodford, raised a monument to his memory.

== Works ==
Travels through Spain, 1775 and 1776 was published in 1779. In 1787 it was reprinted in two octavo volumes, and in the same year a French translation by J. B. De la Borde came out at Paris. Abridgments, with engravings from some additional drawings by Swinburne, appeared in 1806 and 1813. This was the first antiquarian book in England on Spain. The Travels are cited by Edward Gibbon (Decline and Fall, chaps, ix. and x.)

The first volume of Swinburne's Travels in the two Sicilies. 1777-1780, was published in 1783, and the second came out in 1785, with plates from Swinburne's drawings. A second edition appeared in 1790; a French translation of them by La Borde was issued at Paris in 1785, and in the same year a German translation by J. R. Forster was published at Hamburg. At a later date La Borde translated the supplementary Journey from Bayonne to Marseilles.

There were published in 1841, under the editorship of Charles White, two volumes entitled The Courts of Europe at the close of the last Century, which consisted of the letters of Henry Swinburne, mostly on foreign life (dating from March 1774, and chiefly addressed to his brother, Sir Edward Swinburne). Many of the anecdotes and statements must be read with caution. Henry's wife Martha worked over the manuscripts. They were reprinted in 1895.

== Family ==
Henry Swinburne and his wife Martha Baker had four sons and six daughters.

The second daughter, Mary Frances (1771–1828), married on 7 September 1793 Paul Benfield; Swinburne was involved in Benfield's financial collapse. Of the other daughters:

- Carolina (1773–1856) married Richard Watt Walker, son of the Liverpool West Indies merchant and slave-trader Richard Walker (1760–1801). The couple eloped in 1812.
- Maria Antonia (died 1869), married in 1811, as his second wife, Major-General Oliver Robert Jones of the 18th Hussars.
- Harriet (i.e. Maria Theresa Henrietta), married in 1814 John Walker, brother of Richard Walker who had married her sister Carolina. In 1818 he bought Purbrook Park, Hampshire from George Elphinstone, 1st Viscount Keith. Their children included Frederick Walker (1820–1866) who emigrated to Australia. She died in 1861 at Cagebrook House, Herefordshire.

Martha (1769–1778), the eldest daughter, died young. Another daughter, (Marie Rosa) Louisa, befriended the widowed Princess Elizabeth of the United Kingdom, who had married in 1818 the future Frederick VI, Landgrave of Hesse-Homburg. Letters from the Landgravine to Louisa, from the period 1832 to 1838, have been published. The two had met when Louisa was visiting her sister Harriet and family in Wiesbaden, in 1831. Louisa died in 1848, unmarried. Philip Chesney Yorke (1865–1943) who edited the letters was the son of Reginald Yorke, who had married Harriet, daughter of Harriet and John Walker, and great-nephew of Louisa Swinburne.

The eldest son Henry died an infant in 1769. The second son, also Henry, born 1772, was enrolled among the French royal pages, and placed under the care of the Prince of Lambesc. He died in a storm on HMS Babet, on his way to Jamaica in 1800. The third son Thomas Swinburne (1777–1806) was a naval officer lost in the wreck of HMS Athenienne; Joseph Antony, the fourth son, died without issue in 1812.
