= William Cochran (Nova Scotia politician) =

Nova Scotian politician (1751–1820)

William Cochran (1751 – May 31, 1820) was an Irish-born merchant and political figure in Nova Scotia. He represented Halifax Township in the Nova Scotia House of Assembly from 1785 to 1816.

He was the son of Joseph Cochran and settled in Halifax. Cochran died 31 May 1820 in Truro, Nova Scotia.

His brother Thomas Cochran also served in the provincial assembly.
