= William Henry Doyle =

19th century lawyer and judge

Sir William Henry Doyle
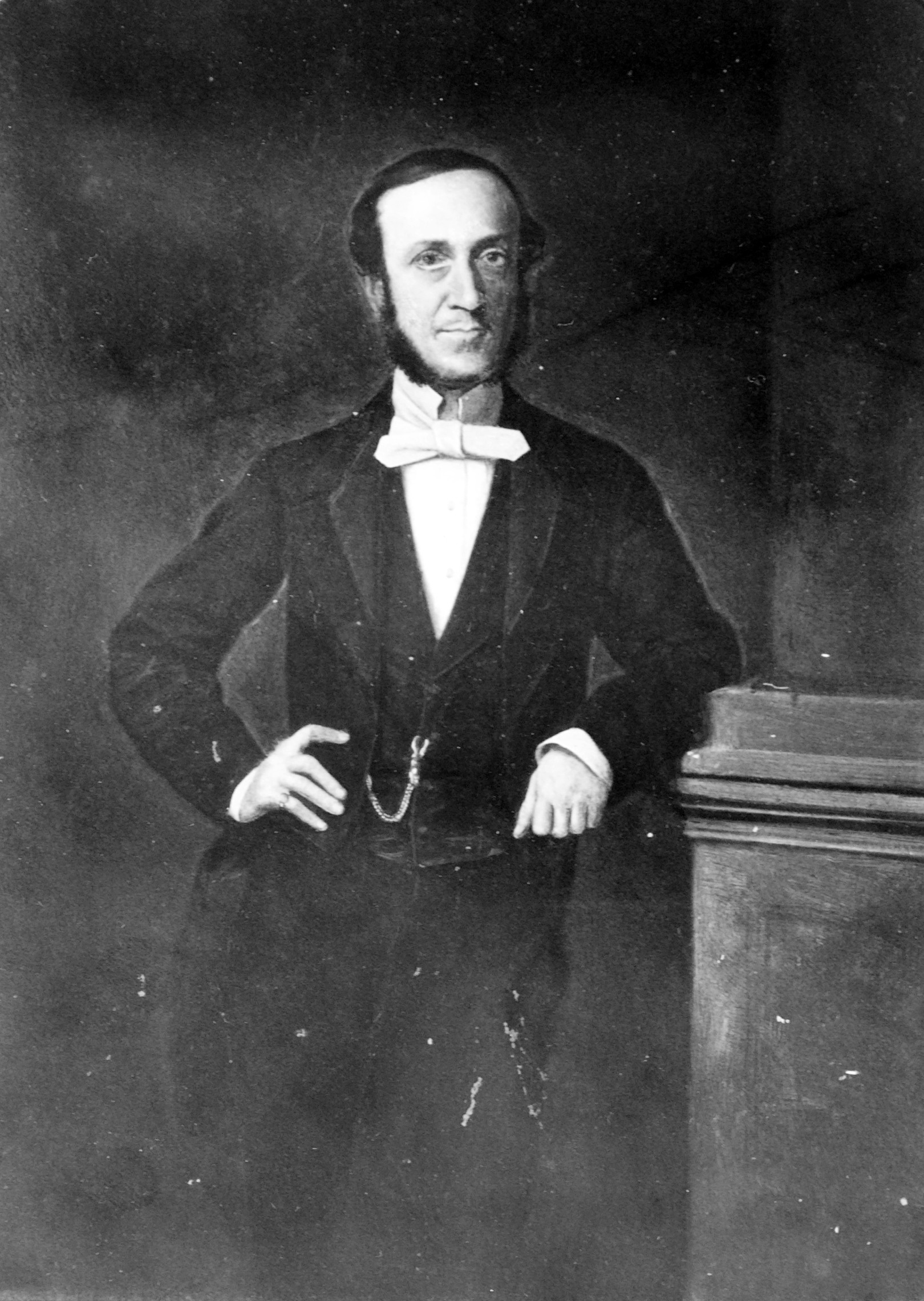

Chief Justice of the Bahamas

Chief Justice of the Leeward Islands

Chief Justice of Gibraltar

Sir William Henry Doyle (1823-1879) was a Bahamian lawyer, judge, Member of Parliament, and Chief Justice. He was appointed Chief Justice of the Bahamas in 1865, Chief Justice of the Leeward Islands in 1875 and Chief Justice of Gibraltar in 1877. He was also believed to be the first Bahamian to be knighted.

== Early life ==
Doyle was born in Nassau, Bahamas in 1823, the son of Captain Edward Doyle and Annabella Amelia Yonge. He was called to the Bar of England and Wales at the Middle Temple on 8 May 1846.

== Career ==
Doyle served as a member of the House of Assembly of the Bahamas from 1848 to 1858, a member of the Executive Council from 1853 to 1865, and a member of the Legislative Council in 1859.

He was appointed to the position of Assistant Justice of the General Court in 1858. He was appointed acting Chief Justice of the Bahamas on 20 October 1864, after the resignation of John Campbell Lees and Chief Justice in his own right on 14 September 1865. It was said that he "distinguished himself professionally in certain notable cases of seizure in the Vice-Admiralty Court, and his success... led to his [later] promotion".

Doyle was knighted by Queen Victoria in 1873 and he is believed to be the first Bahamian to be knighted by a British monarch.

In March 1875, Doyle was appointed Chief Justice of the Leeward Islands, and later served as Chief Justice of Gibraltar from 1877 to 1879.

== Personal life ==
Doyle married Mary Sarah Johnson in 1854. They had one daughter, Mary Amelia Doyle, who became a published poet and songwriter under the name May Kidson. Doyle's sister Mary married Edwin Charles Moseley, the founder of the Nassau Guardian. His son-in-law, Charles Barclay Kidson, became the Sergeant-at-Arms of the Legislative Assembly of Western, Australia.

In 1860, Doyle attended a levee at St. James's Palace and was presented to the Queen by the Duke of Newcastle.

Doyle spent his final years in the English countryside. He died at Cheltenham, England on 27 April 1879; aged 56. He was interred in Cheltenham on 30 April 1879 and was survived by his wife and daughter.
