= May McKisack =

British historian

May McKisack FSA FRHistS
- Born: 30 March 1900; Belfast, Northern Ireland
- Died: 14 March 1981 (aged 80)

Academic background
- Education: Bedford High School
- Alma mater: Somerville College, Oxford

Academic work
- Discipline: History
- Sub-discipline: England in the Late Middle Ages; Political history
- Institutions: University of Liverpool; Somerville College, Oxford; Westfield College

May McKisack FSA FRHistS (30 March 1900 – 14 March 1981) was an Irish medievalist and academic. She was a professor of history at the University of London's Westfield College and at the University of Oxford in Somerville College. She was the author of The Fourteenth Century (1959) in the Oxford History of England.

== Biography ==
McKisack was born on 30 March 1900 in Belfast, Northern Ireland, to Audley John McKisack, a solicitor, and Elizabeth McKisack (née McCullough). When her father died in 1906, her mother took May and her brother Audley (1903–66) to live in Bedford, England. She was educated at Bedford High School, an all-girls independent school. In 1919, she matriculated at Somerville College, Oxford, where her tutor in history was Maude Clarke. She graduated with a Bachelor of Arts (BA) degree, and then taught in a school for one year. She returned to Somerville where she was Mary Somerville research fellow while she studied for the postgraduate Bachelor of Letters (BLitt) degree.

She was a lecturer in medieval history at the University of Liverpool from 1927 to 1935, before returning to Somerville College, Oxford in 1936 as fellow and tutor. She was additionally a university lecturer at the University of Oxford between 1945 and 1955. In 1955, she left Oxford having been appointed professor of history at Westfield College, University of London. She was made an honorary fellow of Somerville College in 1956. She retired in 1967, and was made Emeritus Professor of History by the University of London.

McKisack was elected a Fellow of the Royal Historical Society (FRHistS) in 1928 and as a Fellow of the Society of Antiquaries of London (FSA) in 1952.

== Selected works ==
- McKisack, May (1932). The Parliamentary Representation of the English Boroughs during the Middle Ages. Oxford: Oxford University Press.
- McKisack, May (1959). The fourteenth century: 1307-1399. Oxford History of England. Vol. V. Oxford: Clarendon Press.
- McKisack, May (1971). Medieval history in the Tudor age. Oxford: Clarendon. ISBN 9780198223412.
