= Henry James Burford-Hancock =

Chief Justice of Jamaica

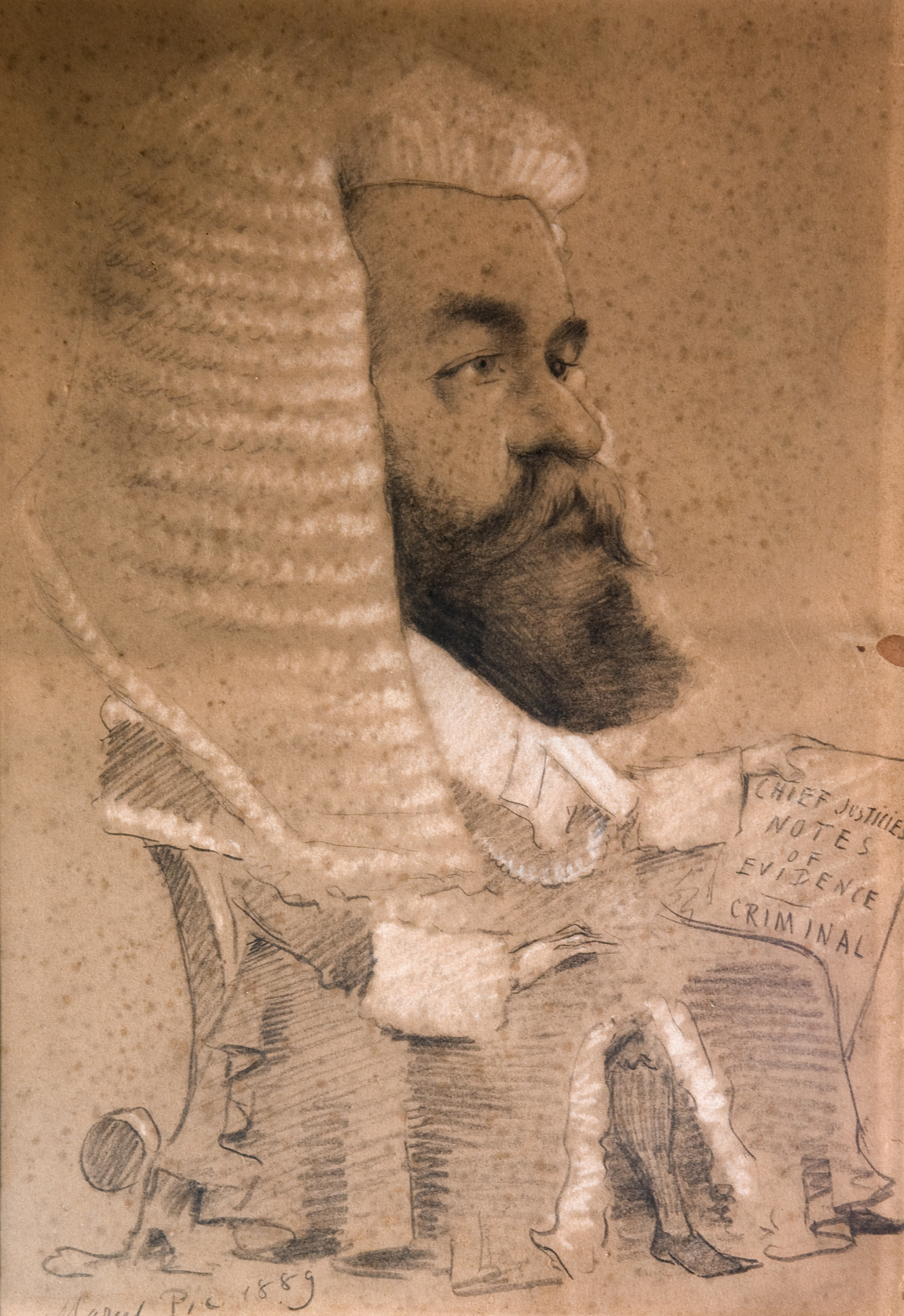

Sir Henry James Burford-Hancock, CMG (died 23 October 1895) was a British lawyer and colonial judge.

Born Henry James Hancock (he assumed the additional surname of Burford by royal license in 1881), he was the son of Henry Hancock FRCS, sometime President of the Royal College of Surgeons. He was educated at Eton College and was an officer in the 45th Regiment of Foot and captain in the Kent Militia Artillery. He was called to the bar at the Inner Temple in Hilary 1866 and practiced for several years on the Home Circuit and at the Sussex and Brighton Sessions.

He was a judge of the District Court of Jamaica from 1876 to 1878, when he was appointed Attorney-General of the Leeward Islands and Chancellor of the Diocese of Antigua. He was Chief Justice of the Leeward Islands from 1879 to 1882, Chief Justice of Gibraltar from 1882 to 1895, and Chief Justice of Jamaica from January 1895 until his death.

He was knighted in 1882 and appointed CMG in 1891.

His daughter, Rachel, married General Sir Richard Haking.
