= Lloyd Noel =

Grenadian attorney (1934–2017)

Lloyd Noel (December 13, 1934 – July 3, 2017) was a Grenadian attorney who served as Attorney General of Grenada from 1979 to 1980.

He died on July 3, 2017, in Brooklyn, New York, aged 83. He was buried in the Dougaldston Cemetery in Saint John Parish, Grenada.

== See also ==
- Outline of Grenada
- Index of Grenada-related articles
