= Bartle Henry Temple Frere =

British barrister and colonial judge (1862–1953)

Sir Bartle Frere
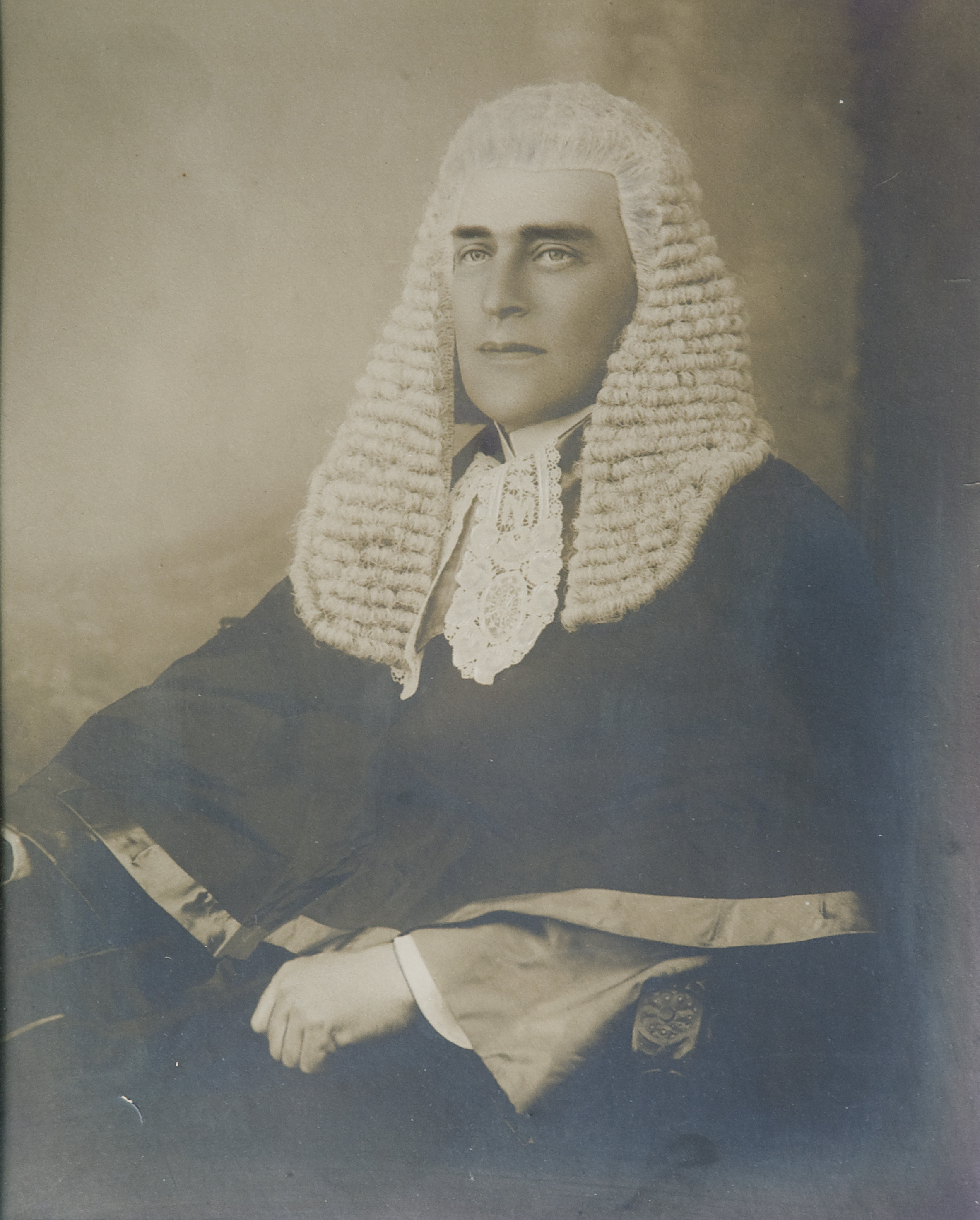

Chief Justice of Gibraltar
- In office 1914–1922

Personal details
- Born: Bartle Henry Temple Frere

Sir Bartle Henry Temple Frere (/ˈbɑɹtəl frɛə/ BAR-təl FREHR; 26 August 1862 – 20 February 1953) was a British barrister and colonial judge who served as Chief Justice of Gibraltar from 1914 to 1922.

== Biography ==
The son of the Rev. Henry Temple Frere, rector of Burstow, Norfolk, Frere was educated at Charterhouse School, where he was a junior a senior scholar, and Trinity College, Cambridge, where he read law and graduated in 1884. He was called to the Bar by Lincoln's Inn in 1887 and joined the South-Eastern Circuit.

Having decided to enter colonial service, he was first sent to Cyprus, where he became president of the district court at Famagusta in 1897 and of the court in Nicosia in 1899. In 1902, he was transferred to Gibraltar, where he spent the remainder his legal career. He was police magistrate and coroner from 1902 until 1911, when he was made Attorney-General of Gibraltar and a KC for the colony. As Attorney-General, he also acted as legal adviser to the British minister in Morocco and to the Admiralty and the War Office in Gibraltar. He was made Chief Justice of Gibraltar in 1914, and served until 1922. He was knighted in 1918.

Retiring to Norfolk, he participated in the government of the county, and served as vice-chairman of the Norfolk County Council. He was High Sheriff of Norfolk in 1930. From 1938 to 1941, he was county controller of civil defence. Frere married his cousin, Gwendolen Winslow Frere (died 1950), younger daughter of John Tudor Frere, in 1896. They had a son and a daughter.

Frere was the author of a work entitled The Laws of Gibraltar. He was also a noted authority on the flora of Gibraltar, and published a book on the subject in 1910.
