= John Farley Spry =

Chief Justice of Gibraltar

Sir John Farley Spry (1910 – 17 May 1999) was the Chief Justice of the Supreme Court of Gibraltar from 1976. He was Chief Justice of the British Ocean Territory (1981–1987) and of Saint Helena and its Dependencies (1983–1992). From 1991, he was president, British Antarctic Territory Court of Appeal, and a justice of the Court of Appeal of the Falkland Islands.

Spry was educated at The Perse School and Peterhouse, Cambridge, where he graduated B.A. in 1932. He was awarded the title of Knight Bachelor as part of the 1975 Birthday Honours, while he was Acting President of the East African Court of Appeal.
