= Attorney General of Grenada =

Attorney General of Grenada is the chief law officer in Grenada.

== List of attorneys general of Grenada ==
- Grenada became British colony, 1763
- Hew Dalrymple
- Edward Horne c.1770
- Sir George Staunton, 1st Baronet 1779–1784
- Sir Arthur Leary Piggott <1784 (to England, 1783)
- Ashton Warner Byam 1783-1789
- Kenneth Francis Mackenzie 1793-
- John Sharpe c.1810
- William Darnell Davis c.1840
- Henry James Ross 1856–1857
- Archibald Piguenit Burt 1868–?1871 (died 1871)
- William Anthony Musgrave Sheriff 1872–1880
- Henry Rawlins Pipon Schooles?–1896
- Leslie Probyn 1896–?
- Charles Henry Major 1901–1902
- Daniel Thomas Tudor 1908-1911
- Nicholas Julian Paterson 1920s
- James Henry Jarret 1929–1930
- Keith Hennessey Conrad Alleyne 1968–1971
- Ernest W. John 1970's
- Grenada became independent, 1974
- Desmond Christian?-1976 (deported)
- Lloyd Noel 1979–1980
- Kendrick Radix 1981
- Richard Hart 1982–1983
- Anthony Rushford 1983
- Francis Alexis 1987
- Daniel Williams?1987–1989 (later Governor-General of Grenada, 1996)
- Francis Alexis 1990–1995
- Errol Thomas 1996–2001
- Lawrence Albert Joseph 2001
- Raymond Anthony 2001–?
- James A.L. Bristol 2008–2009
- Rohan Philip 2009–?
- Elvin Nimrod 2013
- Cajeton Hood 2013–2019
- Darsham Ramdhani 2019–2020
- Dia Forrester 2021–2022
- Claudette Joseph 2022–present

== See also ==
- Justice ministry
- Politics of Grenada
