= Anthony Dudley (judge) =

Gibraltarian barrister and judge

The Hon. Mr. Justice Anthony Edward Dudley
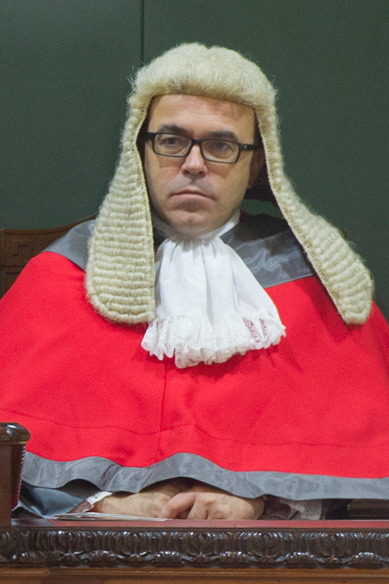
- Anthony Dudley

Chief Justice of the Supreme Court of Gibraltar
- Incumbent
- Assumed office 2010
- Appointed by: Governor of Gibraltar Sir Adrian Johns
- Preceded by: Derek Schofield

Personal details
- Born: Gibraltar
- Children: 2
- Occupation: Barrister
- Profession: Judge

Anthony Edward Dudley is a Gibraltarian barrister, and one of the two judges of the Supreme Court of Gibraltar.

== Biography ==
Dudley was called to the Bar in 1989. After working several years in private practice, he became Registrar to the Supreme Court of Gibraltar, and subsequently, Stipendiary Magistrate and Coroner. After being appointed Additional Judge, became Acting Chief Justice in September 2007.

He was appointed Chief Justice on 1 February 2010, by the Governor Sir Adrian Johns. Dudley is the first Gibraltarian to occupy this position as holder.

He is married and has two daughters.

== Controversies ==
In April 2011, under Dudley's guidance, the Supreme Court of Gibraltar ruled that consensual sex (both for heterosexual and male homosexuals) would be considered legal from the age of 16. Previously, gay men were only legally allowed to have sexual intercourse from the age of 18. Also, the Supreme Court declared that criminalisation of consensual anal sex among heterosexuals was unconstitutional. Both decisions were strongly criticised by some sectors of Gibraltarian civil society, particularly by the Gibraltar Women's Association and the Evangelical Alliance. However, the government made it clear that the question still depended on a referendum to be held on an undetermined date.
