= Attorney General of Gibraltar =

Law officer of the British Overseas Territory of Gibraltar

Gibraltar HM Attorney General for Gibraltar
- Coat of arms of His Majesty's Government of Gibraltar
- Incumbent; Michael Llamas CMG KC since 19 May 2015
- Government Law Offices
- Style: Attorney General
- Reports to: Governor of Gibraltar; Chief Minister of Gibraltar
- Nominator: Chief Minister of Gibraltar
- Appointer: Governor of Gibraltar; (on the advice and recommendations of the Specified Appointments Commission, in accordance with the constitution
- Term length: At His Majesty's pleasure
- First holder: Sir James Cochrane
- Salary: £139,886 per annum (2023)
- Website: www.gibraltarlawoffices.gov.gi/attorney

His Majesty's Attorney General for Gibraltar is the chief legal advisor of HM Government of Gibraltar. He is the head of the Gibraltar Government Law Offices which also include a Director of Public Prosecutions, a Solicitor General and a Parliamentary Counsel. The Attorney General's Chambers have a number of Crown Counsel.

He is appointed by the Governor of Gibraltar, acting on the advice and recommendations of the Specified Appointments Commission, in accordance with the Gibraltar Constitution.

The incumbent Attorney General for Gibraltar is the Gibraltarian Michael Llamas CMG KC.

== List of attorneys general ==
- Sir James Cochrane 1830–1841 (afterwards Chief Justice of Gibraltar, 1841)
- Marcus Costello 1841–>1856
- Frederick Solly-Flood 1866–1877
- Robert French Sheriff 1877–>1892
- Archibald Walter Fawkes 1892–1901
- Anthony Coll 1901-1911
- Sir Bartle Frere 1911–1914
- Charles James Griffin 1914–1919
- Maxwell Hendry Maxwell-Anderson 1919–1929
- H.C.F Cox 1929-1933
- Sir Ralph Hone 1933–1937
- Mansell Reece 1943-1943
- Lockhart-Smith 1943-1944
- Audley McKisack 1944–1947
- Charles Campbell Ross (4 years) 1947-1952
- D.W. Conroy 1952-1955
- Hubert James Marlowe Flaxman (acting), October–December 1955
- W.G Bryce 1956-1959
- Denys Roberts 1960–1962
- J.P. Weber 1962-1963
- Ashley Martin Greenwood 1963–1966
- Cornelius Banahan O’Beirne 1966-1970
- Hugh Hickling 1970–1972
- J.K. Havers 1972-1978
- David Hull QC, 1979-1984
- Eric Thistlethwaite QC 1984-1989
- Kenneth W Harris QC 1989-1992
- J. Blackburn Gittings 1992-1994
- Katie M Dawson QC, 1995-1997
- Reginald "Ricky" Rhoda QC, 1997–2015
- Michael Llamas KC, 2015–
