= Agnes Rose-Soley =

Scottish journalist and poet (1847–1938)

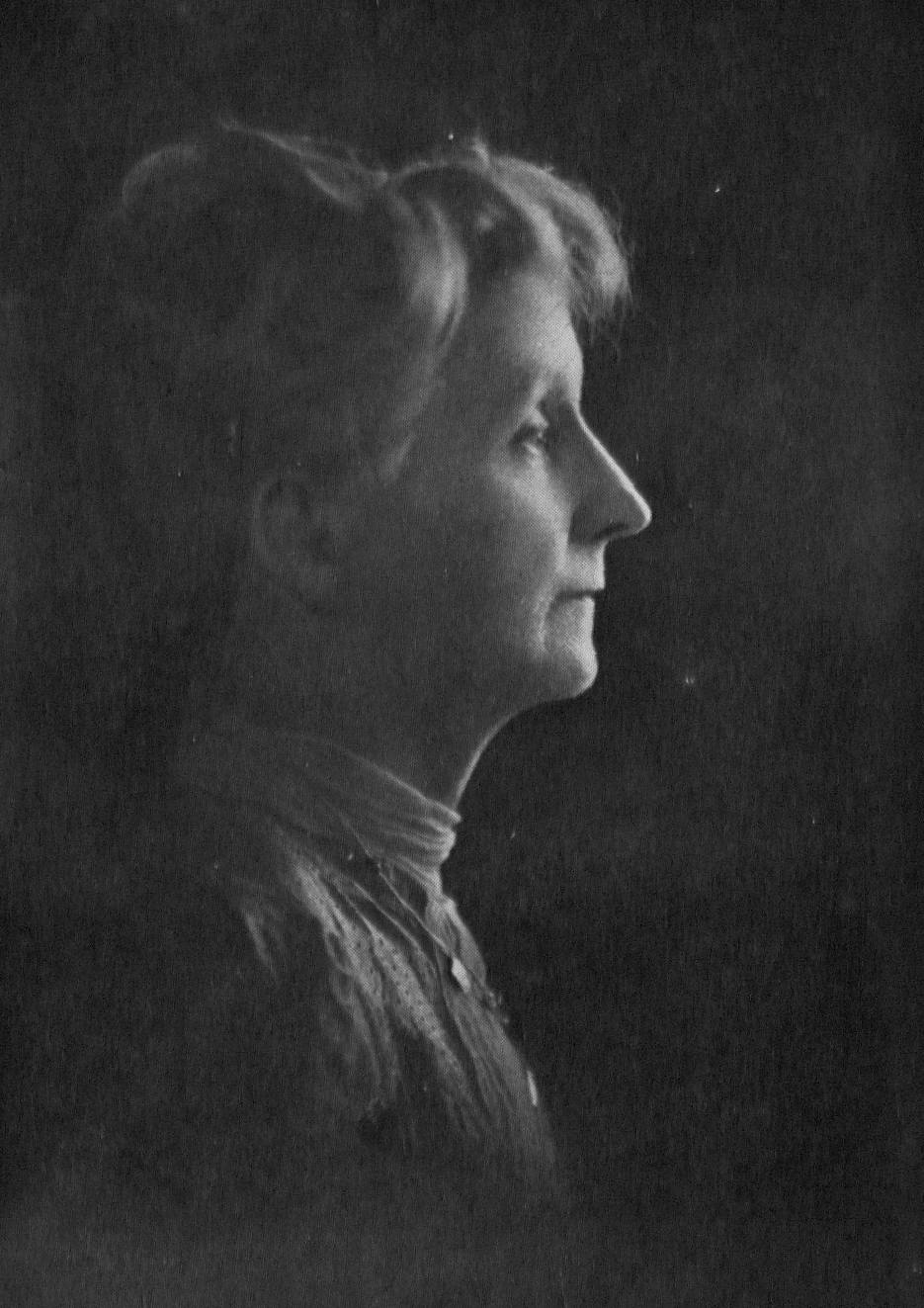
- Rose-Soley in 1923
- Born: Agnes Rebecca Rose; 1847; Scotland
- Died: 19 March 1938 (aged 90–91); Milsons Point, New South Wales, Australia
- Occupations: Journalist and poet
- Writing career
- Pen name: Rose de Boheme

Agnes Rebecca Rose-Soley (1847 – 19 March 1938) was a Scottish-born Australian journalist and poet. She wrote under the pseudonyms Rose de Boheme and Pistachio and sometimes with her husband as A. J. Rose-Soley.

== Life ==
Rose-Soley was born Agnes Rebecca Rose in Scotland in 1847 and grew up in France. She attended Newnham College, Cambridge, but unable to complete her studies due to ill health.

Arriving in Sydney in about 1885, Rose-Soley was theatre critic for the Illustrated Sydney News under the pseudonym Pistachio in 1889 and 1890.

She was married in 1891 in Balmain to John Fisher Soley, a journalist and naval artillery volunteer who had earlier enlisted and served in the Sudan in 1885. It was his second marriage: he had divorced his first wife, Alice Helena Soley, for adultery in 1890, naming actor Stilling Duff as co-respondent.

The couple lived at Monad, a waterfront cottage in Clifton Street, East Balmain, where they entertained "all Bohemian Sydney" at "chic dinners".

In 1893 she composed the lyrics and music for a "Marching Song" for the people who migrated to Paraguay that year to establish a settlement known as New Australia.

She and her husband went to Samoa, where they lived on Manono Island for two years. They then moved to San Francisco, where they wrote for newspapers for five years before spending a year in San Diego. After some time in London, they returned to Sydney in 1910.

Rose-Soley founded in 1914 the Sydney Lyceum Club, of which poet Mary Gilmore was a founder-member. During World War I she wrote patriotic poems, some of which were printed as Stray Chords in 1923.

Over the years her poems appeared in The Sydney Morning Herald, The Sydney Mail, The Daily Telegraph and The Bulletin in Australia, and in London's Speaker and Lyceum Journal, San Francisco's Call and Overland Monthly, and Honolulu's Independent

== Death ==
Rose-Soley died on 19 March 1938 at Milsons Point, New South Wales, and was buried at the Northern Suburbs Cemetery. Her husband died intestate in Young, New South Wales, in March 1944.

== Works ==
- Manoupa, a novel (Digby, Long & Co., 1897)
- The Call of the Blood and other war verses (Sydney Lyceum Club, 1914)
- Stray Chords, poetry (Tyrrell's Limited, 1923)
