= Edgar Unsworth =

British lawyer and judge

Sir Edgar Ignatius Godfrey Unsworth, KBE, CMG, QC (18 April 1906 – 15 March 2006) was a British lawyer and judge. He served as both Attorney-General for Northern Rhodesia and Chief Justice of Gibraltar during his long legal career.

== Biography ==
He attended Stonyhurst College and Manchester University (LLB Hons) and studied law at Gray's Inn, where he was called to the bar in 1930. He was in private practice from 1930 to 1937 before accepting the post as a Crown Counsel in Northern Nigeria. He afterwards served as Attorney-General of Northern Rhodesia (1951–56) and of the Federation of Nigeria (1956–60) before serving two years as Federal Justice of the Federal Supreme Court.

He then took the post of Chief Justice of Nyasaland (1962–64) and was appointed Chief Justice of Gibraltar the following year. He was knighted in 1963.

At the time of his death, he was the second to last person originally appointed as “King's Counsel”, before the accession of Elizabeth II.

He died in 2006, a month before his centenary. He never married.

== Sources ==
- Burke's Peerage & Gentry LLC. (Burke's Peerage & Baronetage 107th Edition, Burke's Landed Gentry 19th Edition)
- Burke's Peerage Partnership. (Burke's Landed Gentry 18th Edition)
