= Chief Justice of the Leeward Islands =

The chief justice of the Leeward Islands headed the Supreme Court of the Leeward Islands.

The British Leeward Islands was a British colony existing between 1833 and 1960, and consisted of Antigua, Barbuda, the British Virgin Islands, Montserrat, Saint Kitts, Nevis, Anguilla and Dominica (to 1940). Prior to 1871, when the Supreme Court was established, the individual islands had their own courts.

In 1939 the Windward and Leeward Islands Supreme Court and the Windward and Leeward Islands Court of Appeal were established, which was replaced in 1967 by the Eastern Caribbean Supreme Court which provides both functions.

== List of chief justices ==
=== Antigua ===
- 1706– Samuel Watkins
- ?–1716 John Gamble
- 1716–c.1742 Samuel Watkins
- ?–1750 William Lavington
- 1750– William Blizard
- ?–1759 Richard Wilson
- 1759–1762 Ralph Payne
- c.1776 Thomas Jarvis
- c.1792–1814 Rowland Burton
- 1814–1822 James Athill
- 1823–c.1833 Paul Daxon Horsford
- c.1844–1847 Richard Weston Nanton
- 1847–1856 Robert Marsh Horsford
- 1856–>1863 Sir William Snagg (Antigua and Montserrat) (afterwards Chief Justice of British Guiana, 1868)
- 1863–1864 Richard Weston Mara (acting)

=== Dominica ===
- 1767–1773 Thomas Atwood (afterwards Chief Justice of the Bahamas)
- 1773 James Ashley Hall (died in office)
- 1773–1779 Thomas Wilson
- 1789–1805 John Matson
- 1806 John Burrows
- 1812–c.1825 Archibald Gloster
- 1827–1828 John O'Driscoll
- 1828–1833 Robert Sympson Jameson
- c.1844 Henry John Glanville
- 1849–? Henry Isles Woodcock
- 1856–1861 Alan Ker
- 1861– Shalto Thomas Pemberton

=== Montserrat ===
- 1804– M. Dyett
- c.1822–c.1825 Thomas Hill
- c.1833 Dudley Semper
- c.1842 John P. Trott
- c.1844 Samuel Lee Frith
- 1844–1847 John Shiell
- 1847–1856 Sir Robert Marsh Horsford
- 1856– William Snagg (afterwards Chief Justice of British Guiana, 1868)

=== Nevis ===
- 1731–1751 John Dasent
- 1754– Joseph Herbert (died 1768)
- 1781–1787 John Dasent
- 1787– John Ward
- George Webb Daniell
- 1810– James Weekes
- c.1822–1833 William Lawrence
- c.1844 George Webb
- 1854–1856 Alan Ker
- 1856 Aston Devoren

=== St Kitts ===
- c.1717 Clement Crooke
- ?–1727 John Greatheed
- 1727–c.1730 Jeremiah Browne
- c.1730 William Pym Burt (died 1750)
- Jeremiah Browne (reinstated)
- 1735– James Gordon
- ?–1759 Richard Wilson
- 1759– Ralph Payne (died 1763)
- 1766– Craister Greatheed (died 1780)
- 1780–1800 William Payne Georges
- 1804– William Woodley
- 1808–1819 J. Garnett
- 1820–1833 Robert Williams Pickwoad (Pickwood) (died 8 Feb 1834)
- c.1844 Joseph King Wattley, Snr
- 1849–? Henry John Glanville
- ?–1856 Aston Devoren (afterwards Chief Justice of Nevis)
- 1856 Archibald Paul Burt (temp)
- 1857–1867 Henry James Ross
- 1873–1874 Robert French Sheriff (acting)

=== British Leeward Islands ===
- 1874–1875 Sir Julian Pauncefote
- 1875–1877 Sir William Henry Doyle
- 1878–1879 Sir George Campbell Anderson
- 1879–1882 Sir Henry James Burford-Hancock
- 1881–1883 Sir John Tankerville Goldney (acting)
- 1883–1886 Sir John Gorrie (afterwards Chief Justice of Trinidad, 1886)
- 1886–1891 Sir Henry Ludlow
- 1891–1900 Sir Henry Wrenfordsley
- 1900–1911 John Symonds Udal
- 1912–1919 Sir Frederic Mackenzie Maxwell
- 1919–1921 Sir Charles James Griffin
- 1921–1922 Sir Alfred Karney Young
- 1923–1924 Sir George Campbell Deane
- 1925–1931 Sir Herbert Cecil Stronge
- 1931–1937 Sir James Stanley Rae
- 1937–1939 Sir Wilfred Murray Wigley

=== Windward and Leeward Islands ===
- 1940–1943 James Henry Jarrett
- 1943–1950 Sir Clement Malone
- 1950–1957 Sir Donald Edward Jackson
- 1958–1963 Sir Cyril George Xavier Henriques
- 1963–?1967 Frank E. Field
