= Henry Ludlow (judge) =

Sir Henry Ludlow (1834–1903) was an English barrister and judge, Chief Justice of the Leeward Islands. He was knighted by letters patent in 1890.
