= Roger Sewell Bacon =

British judge

Sir Roger Sewell Bacon MBE

Chief Justice of Gibraltar
- In office 1946–1955

Justice of Appeal, East African Court of Appeal
- In office 1955–1957

Personal details
- Born: 23 January 1895
- Died: 17 February 1962 (aged 67) London, United Kingdom
- Spouse: Catherine Grace Connolly
- Education: Rugby School
- Alma mater: Balliol College, Oxford
- Occupation: Judge

Sir Roger Sewell Bacon, MBE (23 January 1895 – 17 February 1962) was a British judge who was Chief Justice of Gibraltar (1946–55) and a Justice of Appeal on the East African Court of Appeal (1955–57).

== Early life and education ==
Roger Sewell Bacon was born on 23 January 1895, the elder son of Sewell Bacon. He was schooled at Rugby before going up to Balliol College, Oxford.

== Career and honours ==
Bacon had held a temporary commission in the Cheshire Regiment during the First World War. Called to the bar in 1923, he remained in law for the rest of his professional life. He was a Deputy Judge Advocate from 1940 to 1943 and a legal adviser to the War Office from then until 1946, when he became Chief Justice of Gibraltar. Having served in that post for nine years, he was appointed a Justice of Appeal on the East African Court of Appeal in 1955, serving until 1957.

Bacon had been appointed a Member of the Order of the British Empire (MBE) in 1943, and was made a Knight Bachelor in 1958, the year after he retired from the East African Court of Appeal. He died aged 67 at London on 17 February 1962, leaving a widow, Catherine Grace, daughter of the Honourable James Connolly.
