= Witham's Cemetery =

Cemetery in Gibraltar

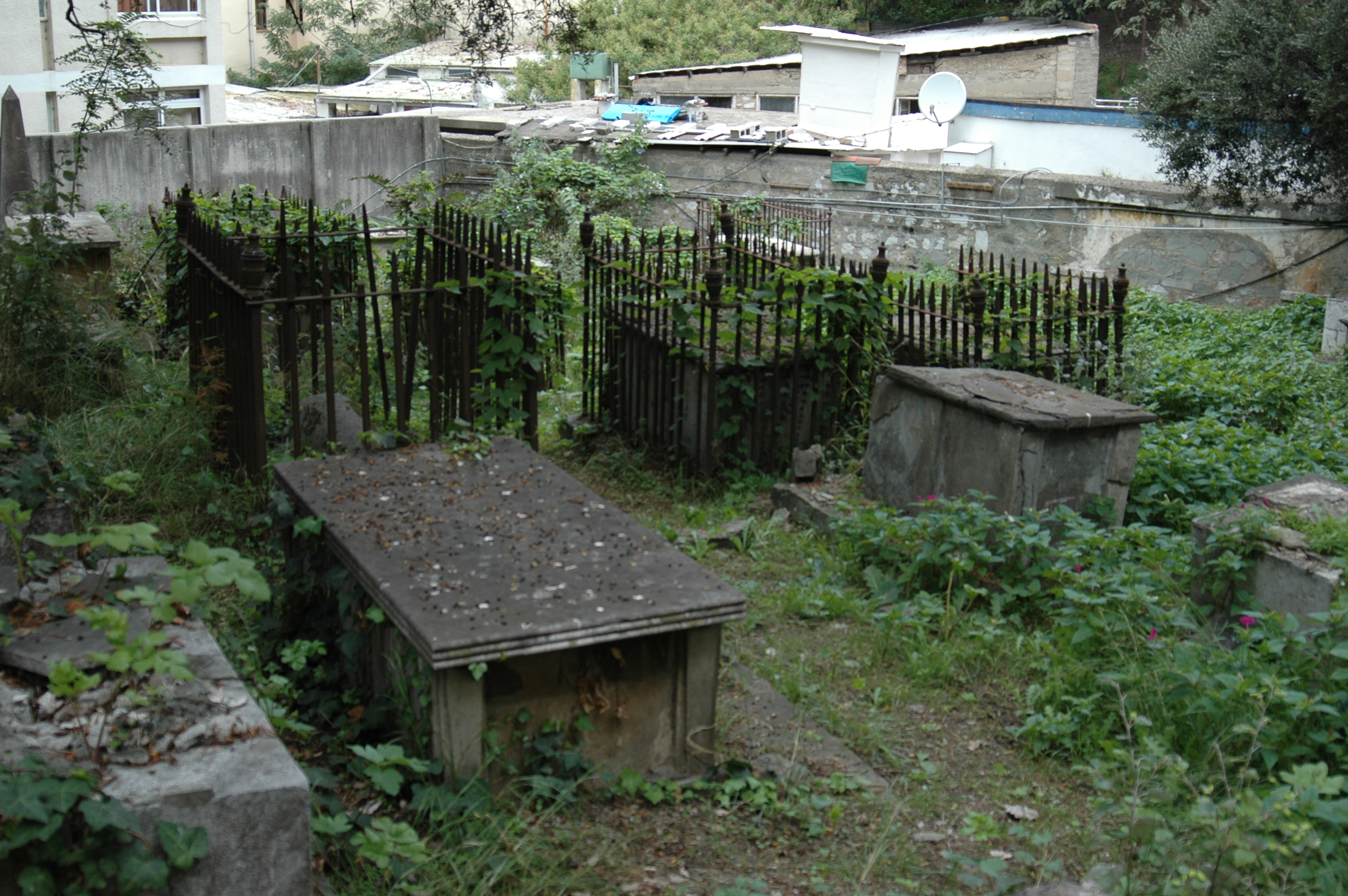
- Witham's Cemetery

Details
- Country: Gibraltar
- Coordinates: 36°07′43.2″N 5°21′03.0″W
- Type: Cemetery

Witham's Cemetery is a cemetery in Gibraltar.

== Description ==
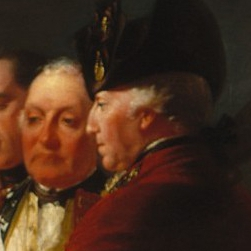
Captain Witham and Roger Curtis in The Sortie Made by the Garrison of Gibraltar, 1789 by John Trumbull

The cemetery takes its name from Captain Witham, a British officer of the 18th century involved in the sieges of Gibraltar, said to be "a rather spirited gentleman, who enjoyed himself by digging up a garden over the night." The Gibraltar Naval Memorial notes that the U.S. Navy, in cooperation with the British, once moved graves from the Witham's Road Cemetery to the North Front Cemetery.

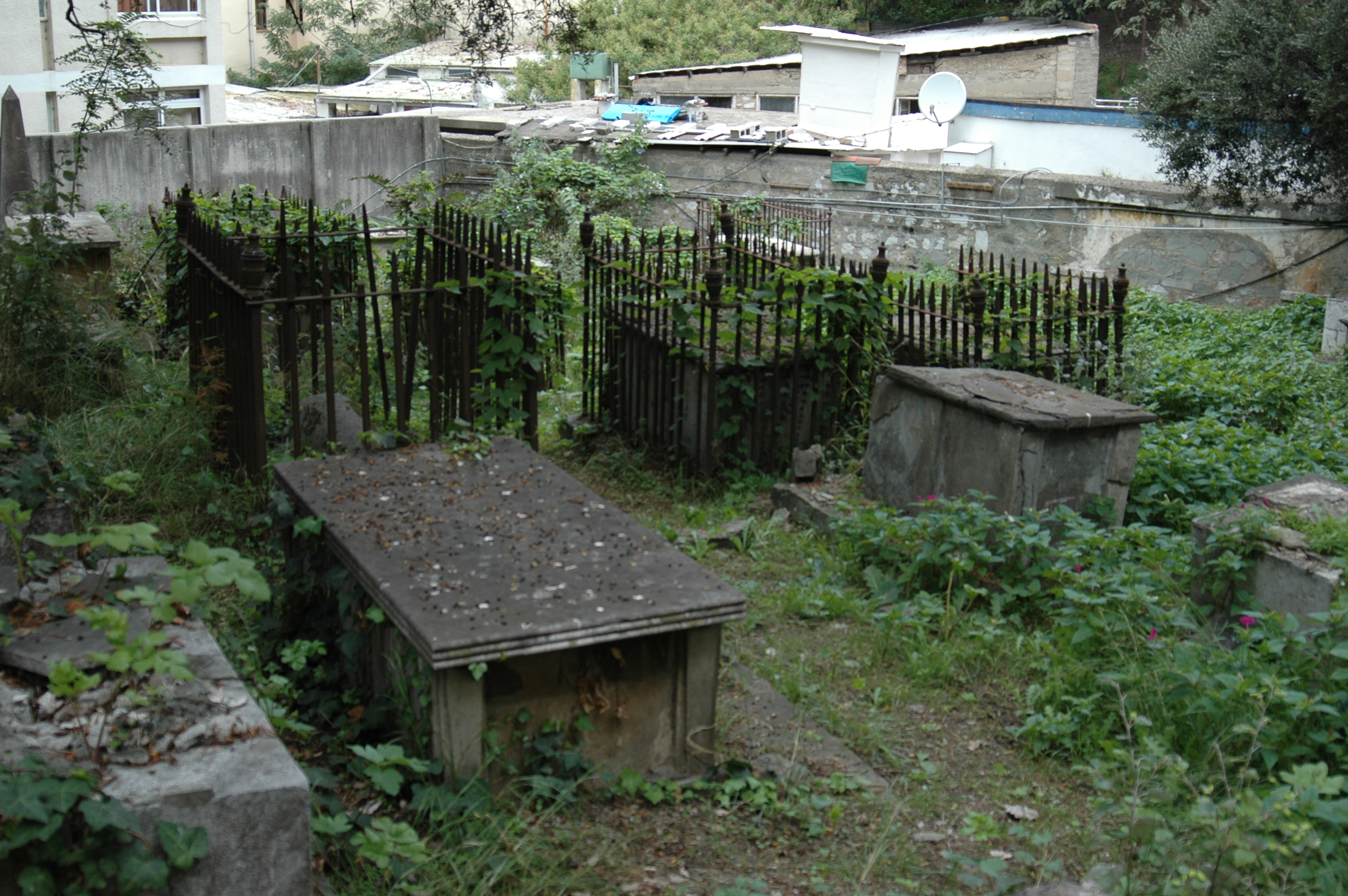

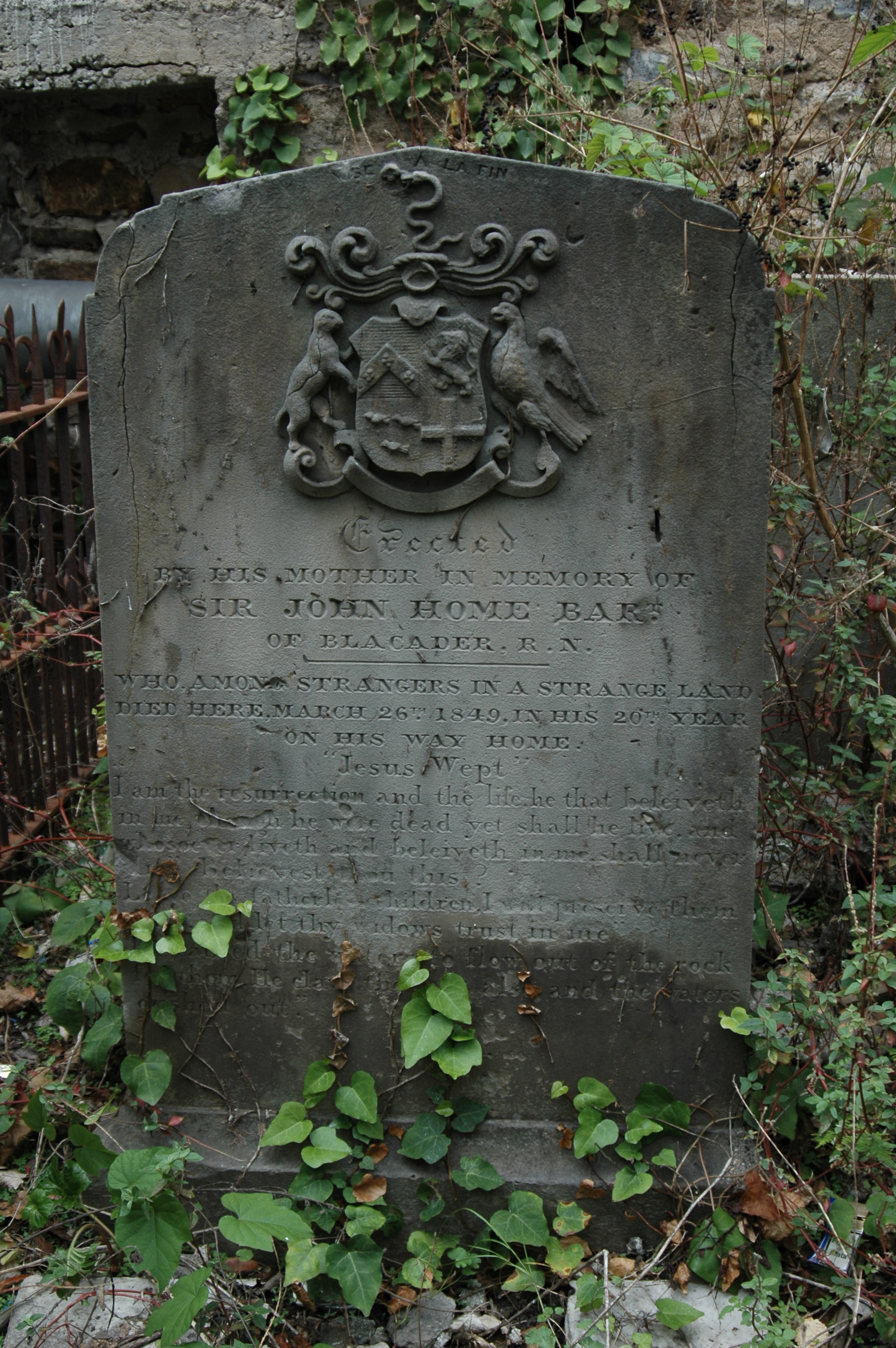

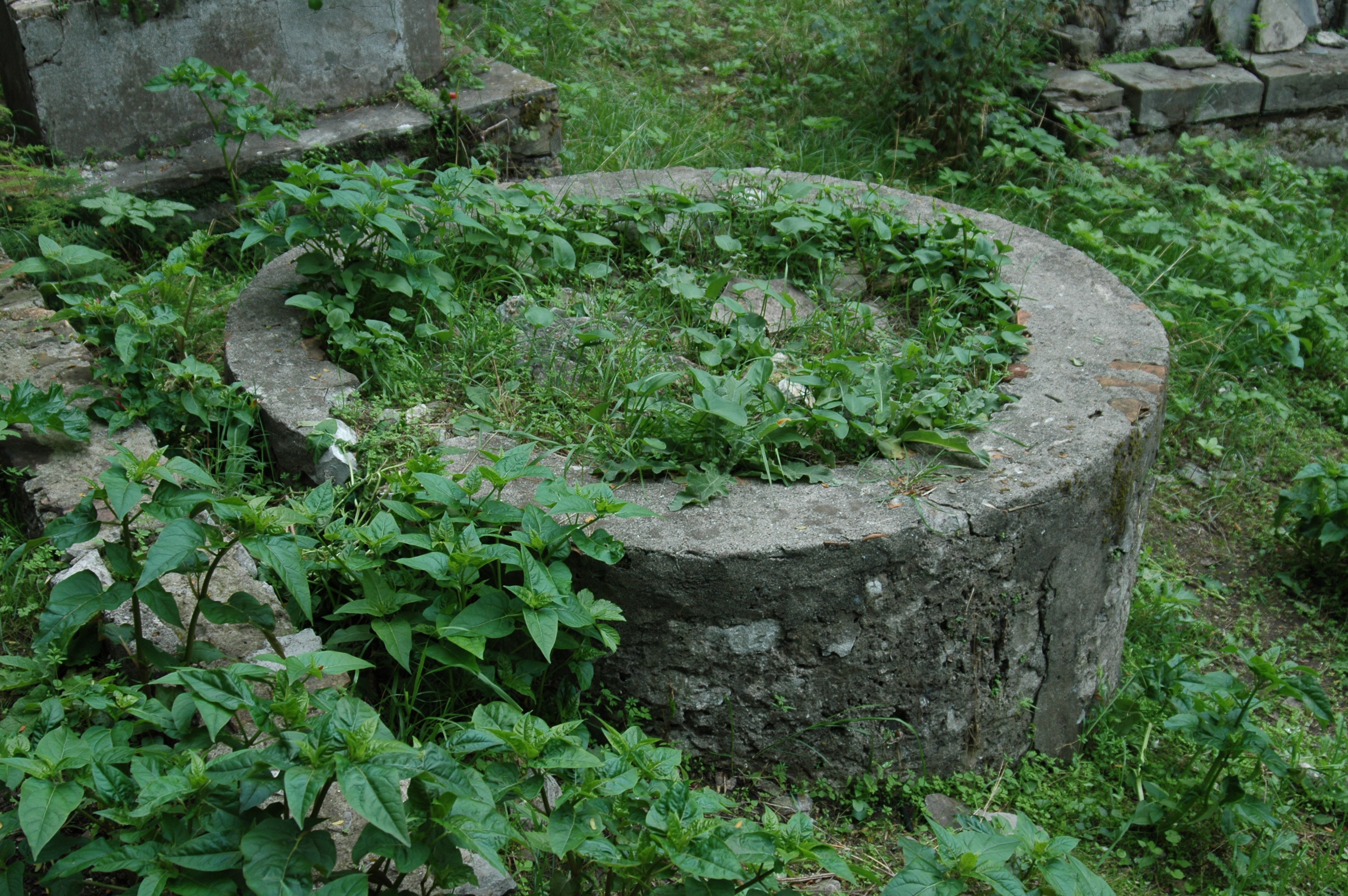

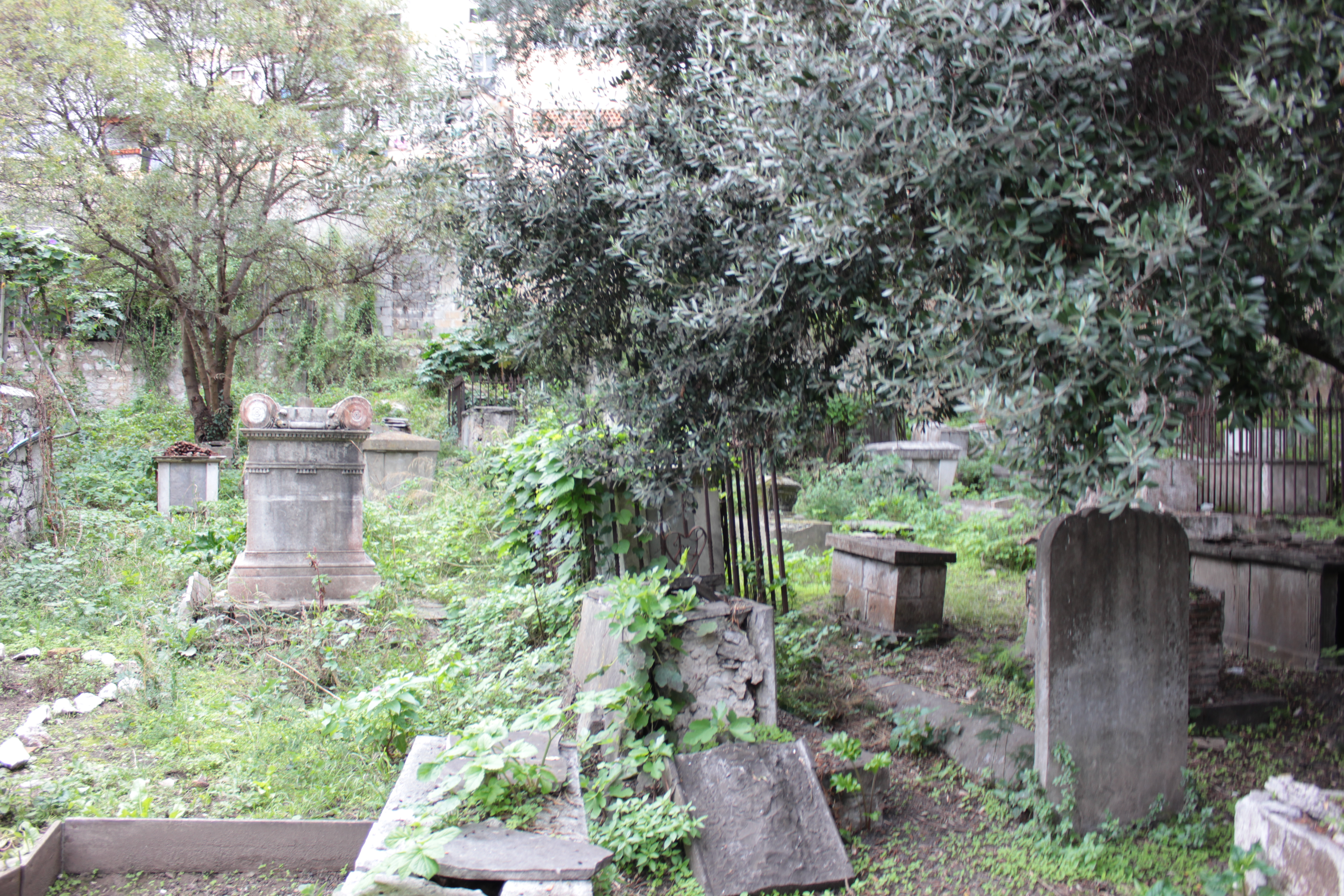
