= Judiciary of Gibraltar =

Government branch of Gibraltar

Coordinates: 36.13773°N 5.352976°W

The judiciary of Gibraltar is a branch of the Government of Gibraltar that interprets and applies the law of Gibraltar, to ensure equal justice under law, and to provide a mechanism for dispute resolution. The legal system of Gibraltar is based on English law and is a mix of common law and statute. The hierarchical system of courts includes a magistrates' court, a supreme court and a non-resident appellate court.

== Judicial Committee of the Privy Council ==
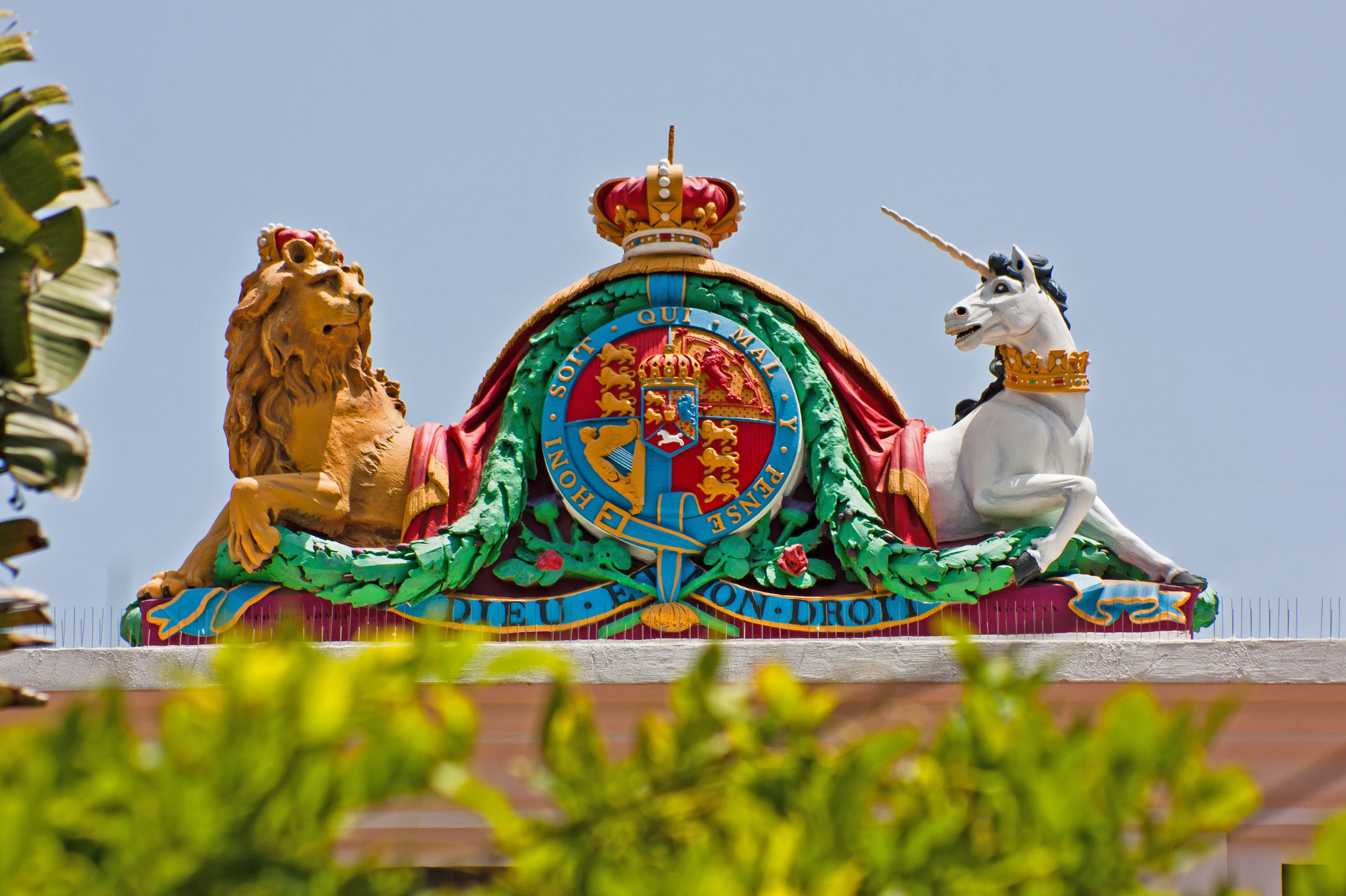
The old Royal coat of arms as used during the reign of the House of Hanover above the Gibraltar Law Courts

The highest court of appeal for Gibraltar is the Judicial Committee of the Privy Council in London, able to hear appeals from the Gibraltar Court of Appeal.

== European Court of Justice ==
In relation to matters of European Union law, the European Court of Justice was the highest court during the EU membership of the United Kingdom from 1973 to 2020.

== Court of Appeal ==
The next highest court is the Court of Appeal for Gibraltar. This court is composed of an odd number of judges not fewer than three. The Chief Justice is an ex-officio member of the Court of Appeal but may not hear appeals of his own decisions.

=== Presidents of the Court of Appeal ===
- 1970–1983: Sir Alastair Forbes
- 1983–1991: Sir John Spry
- 1991–1997: Sir John Fieldsend
- 1998–2003: Sir Brian Neill
- 2003–2004: Sir Iain Glidewell
- 2005–2006: Sir Christopher Staughton
- 2007–2011: Sir Murray Stuart-Smith
- 2011–2015: Sir Paul Kennedy
- 2015–present: Sir Maurice Kay

== Supreme Court of Gibraltar ==
The Supreme Court is composed of four judges — the Chief Justice and a further three puisne judges appointed by the Governor. The Court hears civil and criminal proceedings, including Family Jurisdiction, Court of Protection, Admiralty Jurisdiction and Ordinary (Chancery) Jurisdiction. The Supreme Court hears appeals from the Magistrates' Court.

== Subordinate courts ==
The lower courts are the Coroner's Court and the Magistrates' Court — this court hears mainly criminal and family cases. Below the Magistrates' Court, there are also tribunals for social security, tax and employment matters.

== New buildings ==
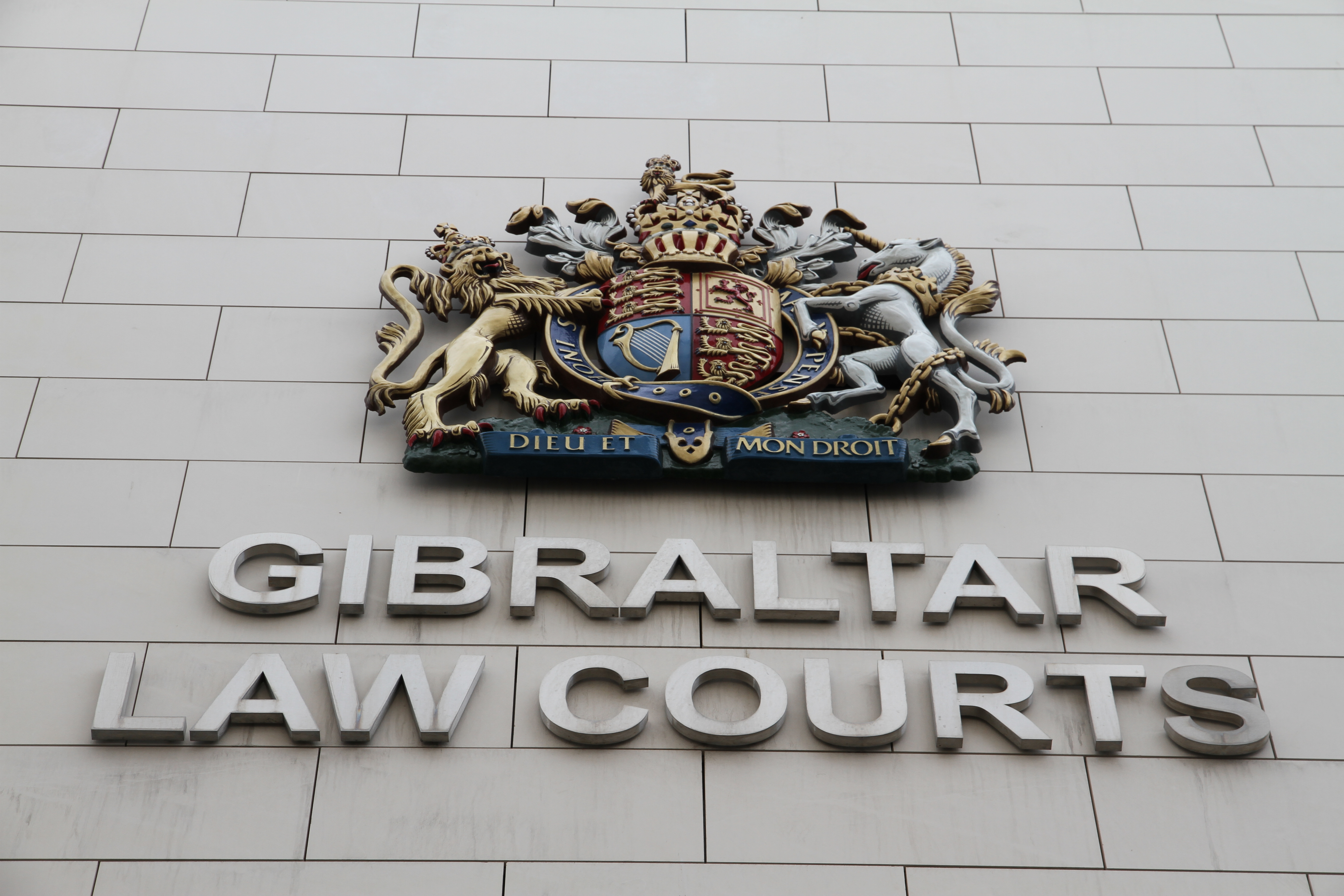
The new law courts

New courts were opened in September 2012 by the Minister of Justice Gilbert Licudi. The new purpose-built building houses seven courts, one for a coroner, two for magistrates and four courtrooms for the Supreme Court.
