= Chief Justice of Gibraltar =

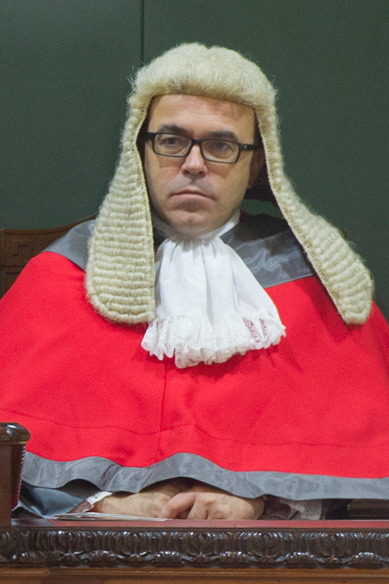
- Incumbent; Anthony Dudley since 2010

The chief justice of the Supreme Court of Gibraltar is one of the four judges who make up the supreme court of Gibraltar. Previously the chief justice was appointed by the Governor of Gibraltar on the advice of the British Foreign and Commonwealth Office. Under the 2006 Constitution the Governor, on the advice of the Judicial Service Commission, makes the appointment on behalf of the Monarch.

As a judge of the Supreme Court, the chief justice is responsible for hearing civil and criminal proceedings, including Family Jurisdiction, Court of Protection, Admiralty Jurisdiction and Ordinary (Chancery) Jurisdiction, as well as appeals from the Magistrates' Court.

== History ==
Notable chief justices include Sir James Cochrane who held the post for over thirty years during the nineteenth century. Notable cases include the resolution of the strange case of the Mary Celeste, a ship found abandoned at sea in 1872.

On 17 September 2007, the Governor announced the suspension of The Hon. Chief Justice Derek Schofield on full pay pending the investigation and resolution of the ongoing conflict between him, Chief Minister Peter Caruana and leading members of the Gibraltar Bar Association stemming from the judicial reforms introduced through Gibraltar's new constitution and the Judicial Services Act. During Schofield's suspension, Additional Judge Anthony Dudley was acting Chief Justice.

On 1 February 2010, The Convent announced that acting on the advice of the Judicial Services Commission, Governor Sir Adrian Johns had on behalf of Queen Elizabeth, formally appointed Anthony Dudley as Chief Justice of Gibraltar. He is the first Gibraltarian judge to be appointed Chief Justice of Gibraltar.

== List of chief justices ==
Incumbent	Portrait	Tenure		Notes
Incumbent	Portrait	Took office	Left office	Notes
Robert Robinson		c.1740		
W. Foye		1817		Judge of Court of Civil Pleas
Thomas Jones Howell		1822		Judge Advocate
Barron Field		1829	1841	
Sir James Cochrane		1841	1877	
William Henry Doyle		1877	1879	
George Phillippo		1879	1882	
Sir Henry James Burford-Hancock		1882	1895	
Sir Stephen Herbert Gatty		1895	1905	
Sir Henry Rawlins Pipon Schooles		1905	1913	
Sir Bartle Henry Temple Frere		1914	1922	
Sir Daniel Thomas Tudor		1922	1926	Returned to England in 1926 after suffering a stroke.
Sir Sidney Charles King Farlow Nettleton		1927	1931	
Sir Kenneth James Beatty		1931	1940	
Maurice Cherry Greene		1941	1942	
Sir Roger Bacon		1946	1955	
(Sir) Hubert James Marlowe Flaxman		1955		
(Sir) Edgar Unsworth		1965	>1974	
Sir John Farley Spry		1976	1980	
Sir Dermot Renn Davis		1980	1986	
Alister Arthur Kneller		1986	1995	
Derek Schofield		1996	2009	Suspended from duty during 2007–09. Replaced by Anthony Dudley as Acting Chief Justice.
Anthony Dudley		2010		

== See also ==
Court system of Gibraltar
