= Chief Justice of Cyprus =

Government office

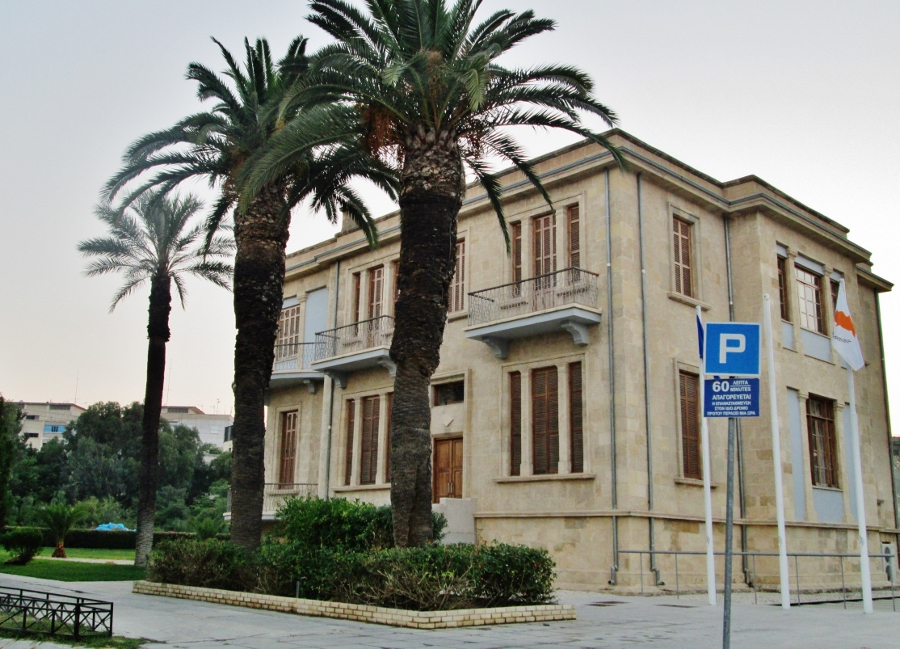
Supreme Court building, Nicosia

The chief justice of Cyprus was the head of the Supreme Court of Cyprus until 1961.

The administration of Cyprus was taken over by the British government, following the Russo-Turkish War, under the Convention of 4 June 1878. Charles Alfred Cookson was appointed in that year as Chief Justice and Attorney General. Following the outbreak of hostilities between the two countries in 1914, the island was annexed by the British Crown. The country became independent on 16 August 1960.

The Supreme Court of Cyprus was established in 1883.

Until 1960, there was a right of appeal from the Supreme Court of Cyprus to the Judicial Committee of the Privy Council, which was terminated under the terms of Section 5 the Cyprus Act 1960

== List of chief justices of Cyprus ==
Incumbent	Portrait	Tenure		Notes
Incumbent	Portrait	Took office	Left office	Notes
Sir Elliot Charles Bovill		1883	1890	Later Chief Justice of Straits Settlements, 1892
Sir William James Smith		1892	1897	Afterwards Chief Justice of British Guiana, 1897
Sir Joseph Turner Hutchinson		1898	1906	Afterwards Chief Justice of Ceylon, 1906
Sir Charles Robert Tyser		1906	1919	
Sir Stanley Fisher		1920	1924	Afterwards Chief Justice of Trinidad and Tobago, 1924
Sir Sidney Charles Nettleton		1924	1927	Afterwards Chief Justice of Gibraltar, 1927
Sir Charles Frederic Belcher		1927	1930	Afterwards Chief Justice of Trinidad and Tobago, 1930
Sir Herbert Cecil Stronge		1931	1938	
Sir Bernard Arthur Crean		1938	1943	
Sir Edward St. John Jackson		1943	1952	
Sir Eric Hallinan		1952	1957	
Sir Paget John Bourke		1957	1961	Later President of the Court of Appeal of the Bahamas, 1970
