= Bucknill =

Bucknill may refer to:

- Sir John Alexander Strachey Bucknill, KC British lawyer and colonial judge (and son of Thomas Townsend Bucknill).
- Sir John Charles Bucknill, English psychiatrist and mental health reformer.
- Sir Thomas Townsend Bucknill MP QC was an English, Member of Parliament and Privy Councillor (and son of John Charles Bucknill).
