= Charles Layard (judge) =

Chief Justice of British Ceylon from 1902 to 1906

Sir Charles Layard

18th Chief Justice of Ceylon
- In office 26 April 1902 – 18 June 1906
- Appointed by: Joseph West Ridgeway
- Preceded by: John Winfield Bonser
- Succeeded by: Joseph Turner Hutchinson

3rd Attorney General of Ceylon
- In office 1 November 1892 – 1902
- Governor: Arthur Havelock
- Preceded by: Samuel Grenier
- Succeeded by: Alfred Lascelles

Puisne Justice of the Supreme Court of Ceylon
- In office October 1892 – 1902

Acting Attorney General of Ceylon
- In office 18 March 1891 – ?
- Preceded by: Francis Flemming

2nd Solicitor General of Ceylon
- In office 27 July 1888 – October 1892
- Governor: Arthur Hamilton-Gordon
- Preceded by: Charles Lambert Ferdinands
- Succeeded by: Ponnambalam Ramanathan

Personal details
- Born: 5 December 1849 Colombo, Western Province, British Ceylon
- Died: 8 June 1915 (aged 65) Kent, England
- Spouse: Ada Alexandria née Julius
- Relations: Charles Peter Layard
- Children: Ada Mildred Layard
- Education: St John's College, Cambridge

Sir Charles Peter Layard (5 December 1849 – 8 June 1915) was the 18th chief justice of Ceylon from 1902 to 1906.

Charles Peter Layard was born on 5 December 1849 in Colombo, the youngest of nine children, to Charles Peter Layard (1806–1893) and Louisa Anne née Edwards (1809–1886), who hailed from a distinguished family, whose earlier relatives migrated to Ceylon. His father was a civil servant and first mayor of Colombo.

Layard was appointed chief justice on 21 March 1902, upon the retirement of John Winfield Bonser, and took up the position on 26 April 1902. He was one of the first chief justices produced by the local bar, and served until he was succeeded by Joseph Turner Hutchinson in June 1906.

Legal offices
Preceded by John Winfield Bonser	Chief Justice of Ceylon; 1902-1906	Succeeded by Joseph Turner Hutchinson
Preceded by Samuel Grenier	Attorney General of Ceylon; 1892-1902	Succeeded by Alfred Lascelles
Preceded by Charles Lambert Ferdinands	Solicitor General of Ceylon; 1888-1892	Succeeded by Ponnambalam Ramanathan
