= Cecil Kelsick =

Chief Justice of Trinidad and Tobago (1920–2017)

Chief Justice of Trinidad and Tobago
- In office 1983–1985
- Preceded by: Isaac Hyatali
- Succeeded by: Clinton Bernard

Personal details
- Born: 15 July 1920 Portsmouth, Dominica
- Died: 27 September 2017 (aged 97)
- Spouse: Sonia (m. circa 1952)
- Children: 5
- Education: King's College London

Cecil Arthur Kelsick TC (15 July 1920 – 27 September 2017) was a Trinidadian judge who was the Chief Justice of Trinidad and Tobago from 1983 to 1985.

== Early life & education ==
Kelsick was born in Portsmouth, Dominica. He was educated at Montserrat Grammar School from 1928 to 1937, and was awarded the Leeward Islands Scholarship in 1938. He attended King's College London where he studied law, (LLB, 1941; AKC, 1942).

== Career ==
He was called to the Bar of the Inner Temple in November 1941, and had a distinguished legal career as Crown attorney and then attorney general in the Leeward Islands and Windward Islands. In 1957, he was appointed solicitor general for Trinidad and Tobago.

== Personal life ==
Kelsick married Sonia, daughter of Cecil Rawle in the early 1950s. Together they had 5 children.

He died on 27 September 2017, at age 97.
