= Stanley Eugene Gomes =

Sir Stanley Eugene Gomes was a Guyanese Judge who was Chief Justice of Barbados and Trinidad and Tobago.

He was appointed Attorney General of the Leeward Islands before August 1945. He then served as Chief Justice of Barbados from 1957 to 1958 and Chief Justice of Trinidad and Tobago from 1958 to 1960. He was knighted in 1959.

In August 1961, he was appointed Chief Justice of the newly established West Indies Federation. The Federation was dissolved in May 1962.

Legal offices
Preceded by Sir Ernest Allan Collymore	Chief Justice of Barbados; 1957–58	Succeeded by Sir Kenneth Sievewright Stoby
Preceded by Joseph Leon Mathieu Perez	Chief Justice of Trinidad and Tobago; 1958–60	Succeeded by Arthur Hugh McShine
Preceded by New post	Chief Justice of the West Indies Federation; 1961–62	Succeeded by Post abolished
