= John Bucknill =

John Bucknill may refer to:

- Sir John Charles Bucknill (1817–1897), English psychiatrist and mental health reformer
- Sir John Alexander Strachey Bucknill (1873–1926), British lawyer and colonial judge (and grandson of John Charles Bucknill)
