= Governor Fleming =

Governor Fleming may refer to:

- Aretas B. Fleming (1839–1923), 8th Governor of West Virginia
- Francis Fleming (colonial administrator) (1842–1922), Governor of the Leeward Islands from 1895 to 1901
- Francis P. Fleming (1841–1908), 15th Governor of Florida
- William Fleming (governor) (1729–1795), 3rd Governor of Virginia
