= Attorney General O'Malley =

Attorney General O'Malley may refer to:

- Edward Loughlin O'Malley (1842–1932), Attorney General of Jamaica and Attorney General of Hong Kong
- Edward R. O'Malley (1863–1935), Attorney General of New York
