= Mary Sanders (disambiguation) =

Mary Sanders may refer to:

- Mary Ann Dolling Sanders, birth name of Ann Bridge (1889–1974), English author and mountain climber
- Mary Jo Sanders (born 1974), American retired professional boxer
- Mary Sanders (born 1985), Canadian-American individual rhythmic gymnast
