= Attorney General Bertram =

Attorney General Bertram may refer to:

- Anton Bertram (1869–1937), Attorney General of Ceylon
- Ron Bertram (1924–2014), Attorney-General of Western Australia
