= Chief Justice of Barbados =

The chief justice of Barbados is the head of the Supreme Court of Barbados as defined by the constitution.

The constitution of Barbados states:

- 80.1 There shall be for Barbados a Supreme Court of Judicature, consisting of a High Court and a Court of Appeal, with such jurisdiction, powers and authority as may be conferred upon those Courts respectively by this Constitution or any other law.
- 80.2 The judges of the Supreme Court shall be the Chief Justice and such number of Puisne Judges as may be prescribed by Parliament
- 81.1 The Chief Justice shall be appointed by the Governor General, by instrument under the Public Seal, on the recommendation of the Prime Minister after consultation with the leader of the Opposition.

The first chief justice of Barbados and St Lucia, Sir Robert Bowcher Clarke, took office on 13 December 1841. In 2020, Justice Patterson Cheltenham was appointed the 14th incumbent.

== List of chief justices ==
- 1841–1874 Sir Robert Bowcher Clarke (also Chief Justice of St Lucia, 1850–59)
- 1874–1886 Sir Charles Packer
- 1886–1902 Sir William Conrad Reeves
- 1902–1925 Sir Herbert Greaves
- 1925–1926 Richard Theodore Orpen
- 1926–1936 Sir Robert Howard Furness
- 1936–1957 Sir Ernest Allan Collymore
- 1957–1958 Sir Stanley Eugene Gomes (afterwards Chief Justice of Trinidad and Tobago, 1958)
- 1959–1965 Sir Kenneth Sievewright Stoby
- 1965–1986 Sir William Randolph Douglas
- Barbados became independent, 1966
- 1987–2001 Sir Denys Ambrose Williams
- 2002–2010 Sir David Anthony Cathcart Simmons
- 2011–2020 Sir Marston C.D. Gibson
- 2020–Present Sir Patterson Keith Herman Cheltenham
