= Charles Frederic Belcher =

Australian lawyer, author and ornithologist

Sir Charles Frederic Belcher OBE
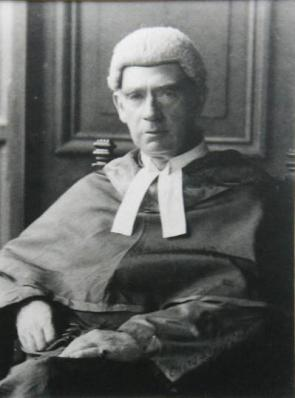

Chief Justice of Trinidad and Tobago
- In office 1930–1937
- Preceded by: Philip James Macdonell
- Succeeded by: Charles Cyril Gerathy

Chief Justice of Cyprus
- In office 1927–1930
- Preceded by: Sir Sidney Charles Nettleton
- Succeeded by: Sir Herbert Cecil Stronge

Personal details
- Born: 11 July 1876 Geelong, Colony of Victoria
- Died: 7 February 1970 (aged 93) Kokstad, Natal South Africa
- Resting place: Kokstad Cemetery
- Spouse: Sara Visger (married 1908-1965)
- Education: Trinity College, Melbourne

Sir Charles Frederic Belcher OBE (11 July 1876 – 7 February 1970) was an Australian lawyer, author, British colonial jurist, and amateur ornithologist.

== Biography ==
Born in Geelong, Victoria, C. F. Belcher was a son of G. F. Belcher, a former member of the Legislative Council of Victoria. He was educated at Geelong Grammar School, and entered Trinity College, Melbourne in 1894, where he studied law. He was first called to the bar in Melbourne in 1902. In 1907 he moved to London, England to enroll at Gray's Inn, and was called to the bar in 1909.

For much of his life he served the British Colonial Service in Africa and elsewhere. He served variously as Magistrate in Uganda (1914), Assistant Judge in Zanzibar, Puisne Judge in Kenya, Member of the Appeals Court of East Africa, Attorney General (1920-1923) and later High Court Judge (1924-1927) of Nyasaland, and Chief Justice of Cyprus (1927–1930). In 1930, he was appointed Chief Justice of Trinidad and Tobago and President of the Appeal Court of the West Indies, offices he held until his retirement in 1937.

He was a founding member of both the Royal Australasian Ornithologists Union (RAOU) in 1901, and the Bird Observers Club in 1905. He was elected a Fellow of the RAOU in 1949. In June 1931, he received a knighthood in the 1931 King's Birthday Honours as a Knight Bachelor. His son, engineer William Redmond Morrison Belcher, served during the Spanish Civil War as a driver for the British Medical Aid Committee and later as a militiaman in the Centuria Malatesta.

== Works ==
- Belcher, Charles F. (1914). The Birds of the District of Geelong, Australia. W.J. Griffiths: Geelong.
- Belcher, Charles Frederic. (1930). The Birds of Nyasaland. C. Lockwood & Son: London.
- Belcher, Charles Frederic. (1944). Genealogical notes relating to William Belcher of Kells (1730-1798) and his descendants. W. Boyd & Co: Nairobi.

== Notes ==
Legal offices
Preceded by Sir Philip James Macdonell	Chief Justice of Trinidad and Tobago; 1930 – 1937	Succeeded by Charles Cyril Gerathy
