= Alfred Lascelles =

Chief Justice of British Ceylon from 1911 to 1914

Sir Alfred Lascelles KC

20th Chief Justice of Ceylon
- In office 1 May 1911 – 1914
- Appointed by: Henry Edward McCallum
- Preceded by: Joseph Turner Hutchinson
- Succeeded by: Alexander Wood Renton

Acting Chief Justice of Ceylon
- In office 12 March 1906 – 31 October 1906

4th Attorney General of Ceylon
- In office 18 June 1902 – 1911
- Governor: Sir Joseph W. Ridgeway
- Preceded by: Charles Layard
- Succeeded by: Anton Bertram

Personal details
- Born: Alfred George Lascelles; 12 October 1857 Harewood, Yorkshire, England
- Died: 9 February 1952 (aged 94) Terrington, Yorkshire, England
- Spouse: Isabel Carteret Thynne
- Children: 4
- Education: University College, Oxford

Sir Alfred George Lascelles KC (12 October 1857 – 9 February 1952) was the 20th Chief Justice of Ceylon. He was appointed on 1 May 1911 succeeding Joseph Turner Hutchinson and was Chief Justice until 1914. He was succeeded by Alexander Wood Renton.

Alfred George Lascelles was the son of Hon. George Edwin Lascelles (a son of the 3rd Earl of Harewood) and his wife Lady Louisa Nina Murray (daughter of the 4th Earl of Mansfield), and was born at Moor Hill, Harewood on 12 October 1857. He graduated from University College, Oxford, with a Bachelor of Arts and was admitted to Inner Temple in 1885 entitled to practice as a barrister.

Lascelles served as Crown Advocate of Cyprus from 1898 until 1902. In May 1902 he was appointed Attorney General of Ceylon, in which he acted as Chief Justice of Ceylon from 12 March to 31 October 1906. He was Chief Justice of Ceylon from 1911 to 1914.

On 26 October 1911 he married Isabel Carteret Thynne. He died at Terrington on 9 February 1952 at age 94. Lascelles had three daughters and a son, his son Wing Commander Francis Alfred George Lascelles DFC died in 1941 serving with the Royal Air Force.

Legal offices
Preceded by Joseph Turner Hutchinson	Chief Justice of Ceylon; 1911-1914	Succeeded by Alexander Wood Renton
Preceded by Charles Layard	Attorney General of Ceylon; 1902-1911	Succeeded by Anton Bertram
