= Solicitor General of Barbados =

The Solicitor-General of Barbados is a law officer of the government of Barbados, subordinate to the Attorney-General of Barbados. The office is one of the members of the government.

== List of Solicitors-General of Barbados ==
- William Savage
- John Sealy (Acting) 1839
- Robert Bowcher Clarke 1839
- John Sealy 1841-1844 (then Attorney-General 1846-about 1869)
- William Conrad Reeves 1870-1876
- Sir Charles Packer 1847, 1855, 1875
- Henry Alletne Bovell 1881-1885
- William Herbert Greaves 1889
