= Henry Iles Woodcock =

Chief Justice of Tobago

Henry Iles Woodcock was Chief Justice of Tobago from 1862 until 1867.

Iles wrote a history of Tobago, published in 1867.
