= Owen O'Malley =

British diplomat (1887–1974)

Sir Owen O'Malley KCMG

British Minister to Hungary
- In office 1939–1941
- Monarch: George VI
- Preceded by: The Viscount Chilston
- Succeeded by: Sir Alexander Knox Helm

Personal details
- Born: 4 May 1887 Eastbourne, Sussex, England
- Died: 16 April 1974 (aged 86) Oxford, Oxfordshire, England
- Spouse: Ann Bridge
- Children: 3

Sir Owen St Clair O'Malley KCMG (4 May 1887 – 16 April 1974) was a British diplomat. He was Minister to Hungary between 1939 and 1941. He was British ambassador to the Polish government in exile in London during World War II. From July 1945 until May 1947, he was Ambassador to Portugal.

== Background and education ==
O'Malley was born in Eastbourne, the son of Sir Edward Loughlin O'Malley and Lady Emma Winifred O'Malley. He was educated at Rugby School, Radley College and Magdalen College at the University of Oxford.

== Diplomatic career ==
O'Malley entered the Foreign Office in 1911. He served as British Minister to Budapest between May 1939 and April 1941. O'Malley helped British secret agents Andrzej Kowerski and Krystyna Skarbek escape Eastern Europe as German forces were advancing. He was appointed ambassador to the Polish government-in-exile in February 1943. He is particularly noted for his incisive report sent on 24 May 1943 to the Foreign Secretary, Anthony Eden, on the Katyn Massacre indicating the likelihood of Soviet guilt and the moral issues raised.

Besides his report on Katyn, O'Malley was also critical of Churchill's role in acceding to Stalin's demands regarding the frontiers of Polish territory after the war. O'Malley raised questions about the British government's complicity in the annexation of another country's territory and whether "the basis of international law is to be law or an exhibition of power politics".

He was appointed a Companion of the Order of St Michael and St George (CMG) in the 1927 Birthday Honours, and promoted to Knight Commander of the Order (KCMG)) in the 1943 Birthday Honours.

== Personal life ==
In 1913, on holiday in Scotland, O'Malley met Mary Ann Dolling Sanders (1889–1974), who later became a novelist using the pseudonym of Ann Bridge. They were married on 25 October 1913 and had two daughters and a son.

Sir Owen O'Malley died on 16 April 1974 at 27 Charlbury Road, Oxford, five weeks after the death of his wife.

== Bibliography ==
- Cloud, Stanley and Olson, Lynne, A Question of Honor, pg. 304, Vintage Books.
- Rees, Laurence, World War II: Behind Closed Doors — Stalin, The Nazis and the West, BBC Books, 2008, page 186.
- Mulloy, Shelia, O'Malley: People and Places, Ballinakella Press, 1986.
- West, Diana, American Betrayal, pp: 204-205, St. Martin's Press, 2013.
