= Stanley Fisher =

Chief Justice of British Ceylon from 1926 to 1930

Sir Stanley Fisher
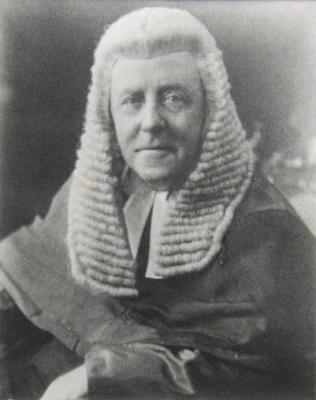

24th Chief Justice of Ceylon
- In office 11 December 1926 – 1930
- Appointed by: Hugh Clifford
- Preceded by: Charles Ernest St. John Branch
- Succeeded by: Philip James Macdonell

Chief Justice of Trinidad and Tobago
- In office 1924–1926
- Preceded by: Alfred Lucie-Smith
- Succeeded by: Philip James Macdonell

Chief Justice of Cyprus
- In office 1920–1924
- Preceded by: Charles Robert Tyser
- Succeeded by: Sidney Charles Nettleton

Personal details
- Born: 12 February 1867 Marylebone, London, England
- Died: 28 May 1949 (aged 82) Budleigh Salterton, Devon, England

Sir Stanley Fisher (12 February 1867 – 28 May 1949) was a British colonial judge who served as the 24th Chief Justice of Ceylon.

== Biography ==
Fisher was born in Marylebone into the Knapp-Fisher family, a London legal dynasty. He was the son of George Henry Knapp-Fisher and Elizabeth Goodchild. His brother was Sir Edward Knapp-Fisher.

He served as Chief Justice of Cyprus from 1920 to 1924 and Chief Justice of Trinidad and Tobago from 1924 to 1926.

He was appointed Chief Justice of Ceylon on 11 December 1926 succeeding Charles Ernest St. John Branch and was Chief Justice until 1930. He was succeeded by Philip James Macdonell.

He was knighted in the 1922 New Year Honours.

Legal offices
Preceded by Charles Ernest St. John Branch	Chief Justice of Ceylon; 1926-1930	Succeeded by Philip James Macdonell
Preceded by Alfred Lucie-Smith	Chief Justice of Trinidad and Tobago; 1924-1926	Succeeded by Philip James Macdonell
Preceded by Charles Robert Tyser	Chief Justice of Cyprus; 1920-1924	Succeeded by Sidney Charles Nettleton
