= Joseph Turner Hutchinson =

Chief Justice of British Ceylon from 1906 to 1911 and colonial administrator

Sir Joseph Turner Hutchinson
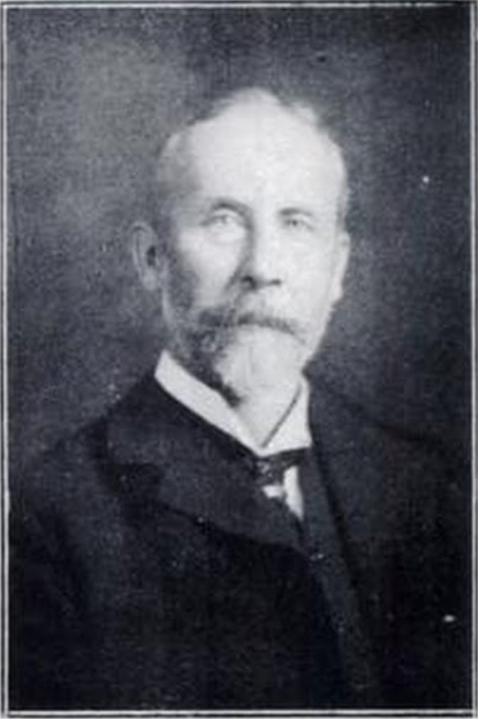

19th Chief Justice of Ceylon
- In office 23 October 1906 – 1 May 1911
- Appointed by: Henry Arthur Blake
- Preceded by: Charles Layard
- Succeeded by: Alfred Lascelles

Chief Justice of Cyprus
- In office 1898–1906
- Preceded by: Sir William James Smith
- Succeeded by: Charles Robert Tyser

Chief Justice of Grenada
- In office 1895–1897
- Preceded by: John Foster Gresham
- Succeeded by: Sir Charles James Tarring

6th Chief Justice of the Gold Coast
- In office 1889–1894
- Preceded by: H. W. Macleod
- Succeeded by: William Griffith

Personal details
- Born: 28 March 1850 Braystones, Cumberland, England
- Died: 20 January 1924 (aged 73) Ravenglass, England
- Spouse: Constance Mary
- Parents: Isaac Hutchinson (father); Hannah Turner (mother)
- Education: Christ's College, Cambridge

Sir Joseph Turner Hutchinson (28 March 1850 – 20 January 1924) was an English judge who served as the 19th Chief Justice of Ceylon.

== Early life and background ==
He was born on 28 March 1850 in Braystones, Cumberland, England to Isaac Hutchinson and Hannah Turner.

== Education ==
He was educated at St Bees School. Admitted to Christ's College, Cambridge 11 October 1869, he gained a B.A. in 1873, and an M.A. in 1876. Subsequently, he was admitted to the Middle Temple 20 November 1876, and was called to the bar 17 November 1879.

== Career ==
He was appointed Queen's Advocate for the Gold Coast Colony in 1888 and promoted to Chief Justice the following year. He then served as Chief Justice of the Windward Islands in 1894, then as Chief Justice of Grenada from 1895 to 1897, and as Chief Justice of Cyprus from 1898 to 1906.

He was appointed Chief Justice of Ceylon on 23 October 1906, succeeding Charles Layard, and was Chief Justice until 1911. He was succeeded by Alfred Lascelles.

== Retirement and death ==
Upon his retirement in 1911, he returned to Cumberland, where he was appointed High Sheriff for the year of 1918. He died in Ravenglass on 20 January 1924.

Legal offices
| Preceded by Charles Layard | Chief Justice of Ceylon; 1906-1911 | Succeeded by Alfred Lascelles |
