= Philip James Macdonell =

Chief Justice of British Ceylon from 1930 to 1936

The Right Honourable Sir Philip Macdonell

25th Chief Justice of Ceylon
- In office 3 October 1930 – 1936
- Preceded by: Stanley Fisher
- Succeeded by: Sidney Abrahams

Personal details
- Born: 10 January 1873
- Died: 15 December 1940 (aged 67)

Sir Phillip James Macdonell (10 January 1873 – 15 December 1940) was the 25th Chief Justice of Ceylon. He was appointed in 1930 succeeding Stanley Fisher and was Chief Justice until 1936. He was succeeded by Sidney Abrahams.

== Career ==
Macdonell was a scholar at Brasenose College, Oxford, was Bacon Scholar at Gray's Inn in 1896, and was called to the Bar there in January 1900.

He was

- war correspondent for "The Times", 1900–1901;
- Judge of the High Court, Northern Rhodesia, 1918–1927;
- President of the West Indian Court of Appeal, Chief Justice of Trinidad and Tobago 1927–30
- Chief Justice of Ceylon, 1930–36; Privy Councillor, 1939
- Knighted, 1925;
- Retired, 1936.
- President of the Balovale Commission (Northern Rhodesia, 1939–41).

He died in Southport in 1940 and was buried in Girthon Old Churchyard, Kirkcudbrightshire. He had married Alexandrina Sutherland Campbell.

Legal offices
Preceded by Stanley Fisher	Chief Justice of Ceylon; 1930-1936	Succeeded by Sidney Abrahams
Preceded by Stanley Fisher	Chief Justice of Trinidad and Tobago; 1927 – 1930	Succeeded by Charles Frederic Belcher
