= Charles Lambert Ferdinands =

First Solicitor General of Ceylon

1st Solicitor General of Ceylon
- In office 1884–1888
- Governor: Arthur Hamilton-Gordon
- Preceded by: Office created
- Succeeded by: Charles Layard

Charles Lambert Ferdinands was the 1st Solicitor General of Ceylon. He was appointed on 1884, and held the office until 1888. He was succeeded by Charles Layard.

Legal offices
Preceded by Office created	Solicitor General of Ceylon; 1884–1888	Succeeded by Charles Layard
