= Richard Newton Bennett =

Chief Justice of Tobago

Richard Newton Bennett (27 October 1770 - 15 February 1836) was Chief Justice of Tobago from 1832 until 1833.

He was born in Blackstoops, County Wexford and educated at Trinity College Dublin. He was called to the bar in 1796. Bennett corresponded with Daniel O'Connell.

His nephew was the first officer to die in the service of Queen Victoria when he was shot by John Nichols Thom in Bossenden Wood in Kent.
