= Thomas Sidgreaves =

British judge (1831–1889)

Sir Thomas Sidgreaves (25 October 1831 – 23 December 1889) was a British colonial judge who was Chief Justice of the Straits Settlements from 1871 to 1886.

Sidgreaves was born in Preston, Lancashire into a Catholic family, the second son of George Sidgreaves. He was educated at Stonyhurst College and the University of London, earning a B.A. in 1853. He was called to the bar at the Inner Temple in 1857.

He was knighted in 1874 for service in British India.

He married Barbara Young, with whom he had six children, including Sir Arthur Sidgreaves, head of Rolls-Royce.

He died by suicide in Great Malvern, shooting himself in the chest in his garden. He had been suffering from depression because of recent financial losses, though he was entitled to a yearly pension of £1,200 (equivalent to £133,000 in 2025). A jury returned a verdict of "suicide while of unsound mind" in the case. He was 60 years old.
