= The Birds of the District of Geelong, Australia =

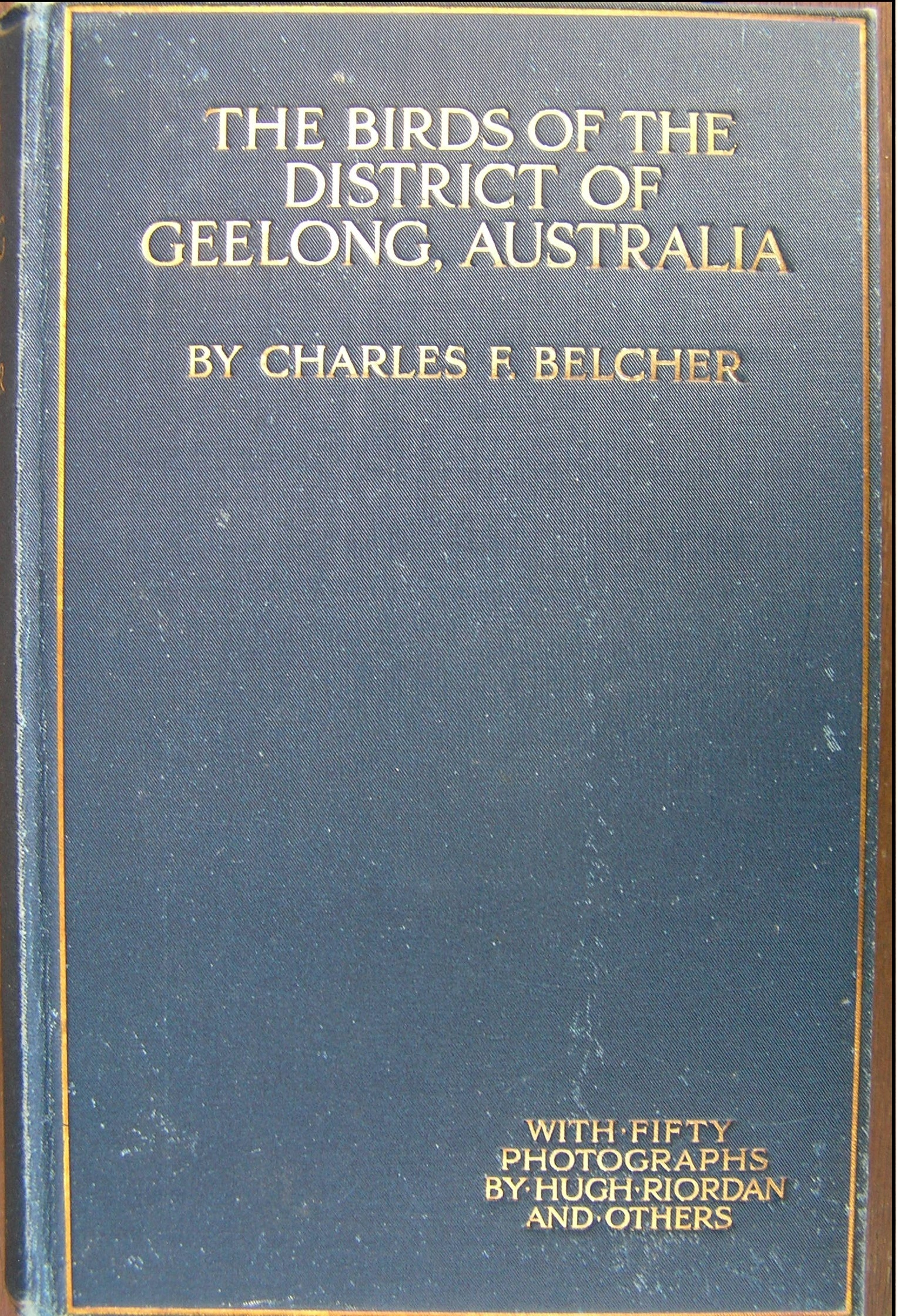
- Front cover
- Author: Charles F. Belcher
- Language: English
- Subject: Australian birds
- Genre: Zoology
- Publisher: W.J. Griffiths: Geelong
- Publication date: 1914
- Publication place: Australia
- Media type: Print (hardcover)
- Pages: xxx + 384

The Birds of the District of Geelong, Australia is a book published in 1914 by W.J. Griffiths in Geelong, Victoria, Australia. Authored by Charles Frederic Belcher, it was published in octavo format (225 x 144 mm), containing 414 pages bound in navy blue buckram. It is illustrated with numerous black-and-white photographic plates. It contains a systematic list of 244 bird species known to occur within a radius of 56 km (35 mi) from the city of Geelong, south-west of Melbourne on the western side of Port Phillip Bay, followed by largely personal reminiscences on the birdlife. The author says in his Preface:

”This book is not a scientific treatise, but merely the outcome of a personal desire, which I have long cherished, to give some permanent and orderly form to the odd notes, jottings, and recollections of some five-and-twenty years upon the birds inhabiting the district lying about my native town of Geelong. If my own satisfaction comes first, it can only be increased by the feeling that at the same time I am passing on to those who are already lovers of birds the fruits of my experience, scanty as these may be, and also that my little book may be the means of communicating to the general reader something of that enduring charm and delight which from childhood I have found in the observation of wild birds".

The book was published when the author was only 28 years old. He went on to become a distinguished British colonial jurist who lived into his nineties.
