= Arthur Sidgreaves =

British businessman

Sir Arthur Sidgreaves GBR, OBE
- Born: Arthur Frederick Sidgreaves; 12 June 1882; Malay States
- Died: 7 June 1948 (aged 65); London, England
- Education: Downside School, Somerset
- Known for: head of Rolls-Royce
- Notable work: Merlin engine development
- Spouse: Dorothy Jessica (m. 1938)
- Children: 2 (from earlier marriage)
- Parents: Sir Thomas Sidgreaves (father); Barbara Catharine (mother)

Sir Arthur Frederick Sidgreaves OBE (12 June 1882 – 7 June 1948) was a British businessman who was head of Rolls-Royce, notably during World War II.

== Early life ==
He was born 12 June 1882 in the Malay States, the son of Sir Thomas Sidgreaves, Chief Justice of the Supreme Court of the Straits Settlements, and Barbara Catharine. His father, suffering from financial problems, committed suicide in 1890.

He attended Downside School in Somerset. In the First World War, he served in the RNAS and RAF.

== Career ==
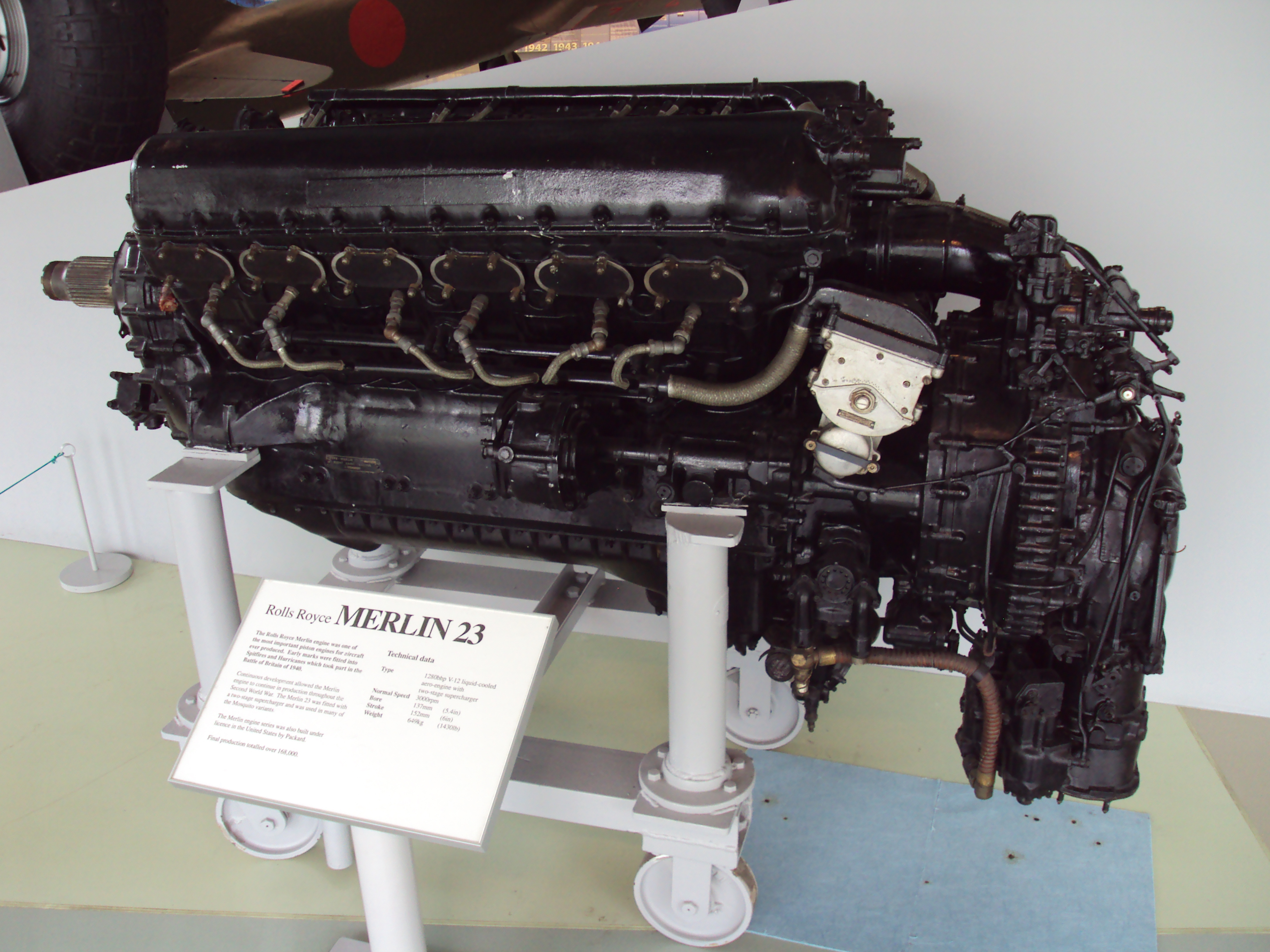
Rolls-Royce Merlin piston engine at the RAF Museum in June 2010

=== Rolls-Royce ===
He joined Rolls-Royce in July 1920, where he was export manager in the London offices. In 1926 he became General Sales Manager. In 1929 he became managing director, where he was managing director for 17 years, and throughout the war. From 1935, the British government introduced its shadow factory programme, and he jointly instigated the Rolls-Royce factory to produce the Rolls-Royce Merlin engine in Cheshire. Another factory was built at Hillington, Scotland, which went into production six months after commencement of being built. He helped get the Merlin engine manufactured in the US, under licence.

It was his decision that the Merlin engine was developed. He also took a part in developing the jet engine. He had no vast technical knowledge, but was an astute, and no-nonsense, businessman.

== Personal life ==
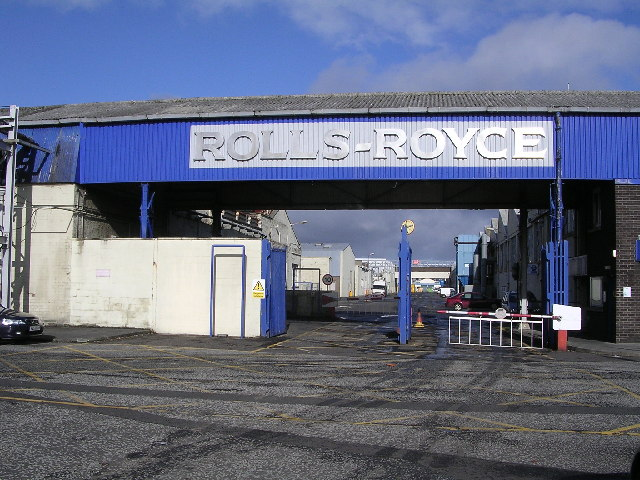
Rolls-Royce site at Glasgow in October 2005

He lived at Penn, Buckinghamshire. He was appointed the OBE in 1918. In 1938 he married Dorothy Jessica in Hove, Sussex. An earlier marriage in 1916 in Kensington had produced two sons in 1917 and 1921.

In the 1945 New Year Honours, he was knighted for his services during the war. On Monday 7 June 1948, disturbed by an unfavourable medical report, he threw himself under a train at Green Park underground station. He had a throat infection and was 66.

Business positions
Preceded by Basil Johnson	Managing Director of Rolls-Royce Limited; 1929 –	Succeeded by
Professional and academic associations
Preceded by	President of the Society of British Aircraft Constructors; 1941-1943	Succeeded by
