= Emma Winifred O'Malley =

British botanical collector and writer (1847-1927)

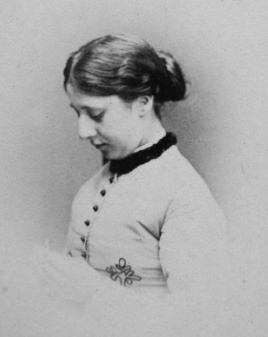
- Born: 1847; Essex
- Died: June 25, 1927 (aged 79–80)
- Spouse(s): Edward Loughlin O'Malley
- Children: Owen O'Malley
- Parent(s): Joseph Hardcastle; Frances Lambirth
- Relatives: Mary Collier, Emily E. Hardcastle, Frances Alice Hardcastle, Henry Hardcastle

Lady Emma Winifred Hardcastle O'Malley (1847 – June 25, 1927) was a British botanical collector and writer.

Emma Winifred O'Malley was born in 1847 in Essex, the second daughter of Joseph Alfred Hardcastle, Member of Parliament (MP) for Colchester and Bury St Edmunds, and Frances Lambirth O'Malley. Her siblings included the diarist Mary Collier.

In 1869 she married Edward Loughlin O'Malley, a lawyer and judge. She accompanied him to numerous postings in the British Empire, including Jamaica and Hong Kong. She collected local plants, with a specialization in ferns, and donated specimens to the British Museum. She also wrote an article on the ferns of Hong Kong for Hardwicke's Science-Gossip.

Emma Winifred O'Malley died on 25 June 1927.

== Family ==
O'Malley had five children:

- Charles Loughlin Meyler O'Malley (1873-1952)
- George Peter Bermingham O'Malley (1875-1885)
- Marie Aglaïa Margery O'Malley (1880-1962)
- Grace Evangeline "Eva" O'Malley (1884-1960), memoirist
- Owen St. Clair O'Malley (1887-1974), diplomat

== Bibliography ==
- O'Malley, Mrs. E. L. "Some Ferns of Hong-Kong," Hardwicke's science-gossip. Volume 21, 1885.
