= John Winfield Bonser =

Chief Justice of British Ceylon from 1893 to 1902

The Right Honourable Sir John Winfield Bonser PC KC
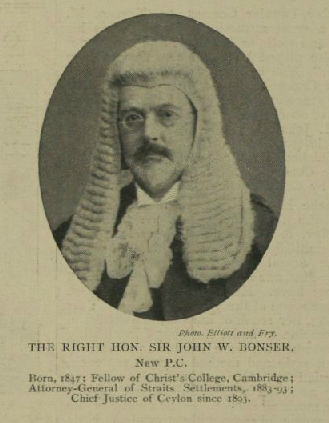
- Sir John Bonser

Chief Justice of Ceylon
- In office 1893–1902
- Preceded by: John Budd Phear
- Succeeded by: Joseph Turner Hutchinson

Chief Justice of the Straits Settlements
- In office 1893–1893
- Preceded by: Elliot Bovill
- Succeeded by: William Henry Hyndman Jones

Personal details
- Born: 24 October 1847 North Walsham, Norfolk, England
- Died: 9 December 1914 (aged 67) London, England
- Spouse: Mary Catherine Colville
- Education: Christ's College, Cambridge; Lincoln's Inn
- Occupation: Lawyer, judge
- Awards: Knights Bachelor

Sir John Winfield Bonser, PC (24 October 1847 – 9 December 1914) was a British colonial judge. He served as the Chief Justice of Ceylon for almost 10 years.

== Early life ==
Bonser was the son of Reverend John Bonser. He was born in Walsham, Norfolk, in 1847.

Bonser was educated at Ashby Grammar School, Loughborough Grammar School, Heath Grammar School admitted October 1863, and Christ's College, Cambridge and Lincoln's Inn.

== Legal career ==
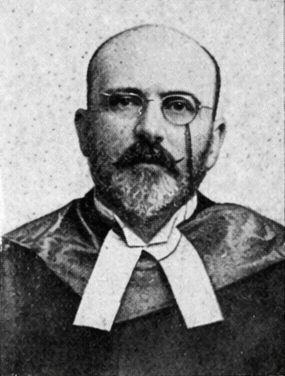
John Winfield Bonser

He was Attorney General of the Straits Settlements between 1883 and 1893. He was appointed Chief Justice of the Straits Settlements, in 1893, on the untimely death from cholera of the incumbent Chief Justice, Elliot Bovill. He soon transferred to Ceylon where he served as Chief Justice of Ceylon from 1893 to 1902. He was knighted in 1894.

He was appointed to the Privy Council on 11 June 1902, and sat as a Member of Judicial Committee of the Privy Council from 1902 onwards.

== Marriage ==
Bonser married Mary Catherine Colville, daughter of Colonel Hon. Sir William James Colville and Georgiana Mary Montagu Baillie, on 19 April 1899.

== Death ==
Bonser died in London, England in December 1914.
