= Denys Williams =

Barbadian politician

The Honourable Sir Denys Williams, KCMG GCM

Acting Governor-General of Barbados
- In office 19 December 1995 – 1 June 1996
- Monarch: Elizabeth II
- Prime Minister: Owen Arthur
- Preceded by: Dame Nita Barrow
- Succeeded by: Sir Clifford Husbands

Personal details
- Born: 12 October 1929 British Windward Islands (present day Barbados)
- Died: 7 August 2014 (aged 84) Bridgetown, Barbados
- Spouse: Carmel Williams

Sir Denys Ambrose Williams, KCMG, GCM (12 October 1929 – 7 August 2014) was a Chief Justice of Barbados. He served as acting Governor-General of Barbados from 19 December 1995 until 1 June 1996.

== Biography ==
=== Early life and education ===
Denys Ambrose Williams was born on 12 October 1929 in Barbados. He was one of 10 children of family to George C. Williams and Violet Williams. He studied at Combermere School and Harrison College in Barbados, won a Barbados Scholarship in 1949 and went on to study law at Oxford University, subsequently being admitted to the English Bar at the Middle Temple in London.

=== Career ===
He then returned to the West Indies, spending some time working for the West Indies Federation based in Trinidad, before returning to Barbados in 1955 and being admitted as a Magistrate.

Holding the post of Barbados' Chief Parliamentary Counsel, Denys Ambrose Williams in cooperation with Sir Roy Marshall draft the constitution of Barbados, before Barbados gained independence in 1966. Also in that period he was one of the member of team accompanying first Prime Minister Errol Barrow to the Independence conference in London.

In 1966, Denys was appointed a judge, at the time the youngest judge in the Commonwealth at the age of 37, and subsequently became Chief Justice of Barbados. In May 1992, he declared illegal the government's decision to cut wages in the public sector by eight percent. This decision was upheld unanimously by the Judicial Committee of the Privy Council in London, England. In 1981, he presided over the extradition of the notorious robber Ronald Biggs, ruling that Biggs could not be extradited to another country because the Parliament of Barbados had not ratified the extradition treaty with the UK.

In 1987, Queen Elizabeth II awarded the knighthood to Denis Williams, which was a great honour and significant event for him.

From 1995 to 1996, he held the post of acting Governor General of Barbados.

Sir Denys retired as Chief Justice on 10 October 2001. At the time of his retirement, Sir Denys had been the longest serving judge in the Commonwealth, having given 34 years of his life to the judicial service of Barbados.

Sir Denys Ambrose Williams was also an honorary member of the Canadian Bar and served as Commissioner of the National Insurance Scheme in Barbados until June 2014. He was also a member of the Rotary Club of Barbados and served as Chief Scout of the Boy Scouts of Barbados for several years. In July 2012, Sir Denys, along with former Governor-General Sir Clifford Husbands were conferred as Honorary Chief Scouts.

== Personal life ==
Sir Denys was married to Carmel, Lady Williams, and they were the parents of six children: Denise, Fiona, Shaun, Clare, Roslyn, and Simon, and five grandchildren.

Sir Denys Ambrose Williams died on 7 August 2014 at his home in Rockley, Christ Church, Barbados, at the age of 84. His body was interred at the Coral Ridge Memorial Gardens, The Ridge, Christ Church, Barbados, on Wednesday, 13 August 2014.

== Awards ==
- Was awarded the Gold Crown of Merit (GCM).
- Knight Bachelor in the 1987.
- Knight Commander of the Order of St. Michael and St. George (KCMG) in 1993.

Government offices
Preceded by Dame Nita Barrow	Governor General of Barbados; 1995–1996	Succeeded by Sir Clifford Husbands
