= Robert Bowcher Clarke =

Sir Robert Bowcher Clarke (1803–1881) was a Barbadian barrister, the Solicitor-General of Barbados from 1837 to 1842, the Speaker of the House of Assembly of the Bahamas, and Chief Justice of Barbados and St. Lucia. Clarke was knighted in 1840 and made a Companion of the Order of the Bath in 1848.

== Early life and career ==
Clarke was born in 1803 in Barbados, the son of Robert Bowcher Clarke and his wife Elizabeth (née Waple).

Clarke attended Codrington Grammar School before studying at Trinity College, Cambridge, where he graduated in 1827. That same year, he was called to the Bar of England and Wales at the Inner Temple. In 1829, Clarke married Emily Maxwell Spooner.

Clarke began his legal career in Barbados. He served as Solicitor-General of Barbados from 1837 to 1842, and later Speaker of the House of Assembly.

On 13 December 1841, Clarke was appointed Chief Justice of Barbados, a position he held until his retirement in 1874. Between 1850 and 1859, he also served as Chief Justice of St. Lucia.

== Dispute over future of Codrington College ==
Clarke's alma mater, Codrington Grammar School, had been founded in 1745 with the profits from the bequest of Christopher Codrington. Codrington had intended the school to be a university modelled on Oxford and Cambridge, unusually for the time, to benefit the Afro-Caribbean population of Barbados. The school was initially, however, established as a grammar school. In 1830, it was converted to a theological college.

Clarke, a former student, became a central figure in a heated debate about the future of the institution. Clarke opposed the transformation of the school into a theological college and lobbied influential figures, including the Secretary of State for the Colonies, to restore the college to its earlier role.

== Awards and honours ==
Clarke was knighted in 1840 for his contributions to the emancipation of slaves. He also received the Companion of the Order of the Bath (Civil Division) in 1848.

== Death ==
Clarke died on 25 January 1874 at his home "Eldridge" in Chislehurst, England He was 78.
