= Alexander Wood Renton =

Chief Justice of British Ceylon from 1914 to 1918

Sir Alexander Wood Renton GCMG KC
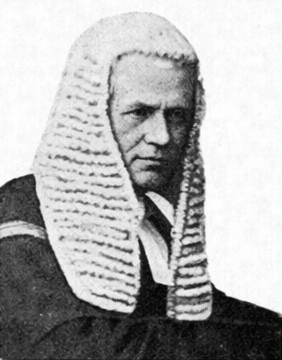

21st Chief Justice of Ceylon
- In office 22 August 1914 – 1918
- Appointed by: Robert Chalmers
- Preceded by: Alfred Lascelles
- Succeeded by: Anton Bertram

Puisne Justice of the Supreme Court of Ceylon

Personal details
- Born: 24 June 1861 Auchtermuchty, Fife, Scotland
- Died: 17 June 1933 (aged 71) London, England
- Education: University of Edinburgh

Sir Alexander Wood Renton GCMG KC (24 June 1861 – 17 June 1933) was a Scottish lawyer and British colonial judge. He served as the 21st Chief Justice of Ceylon from 1914 to 1918.

== Biography ==
Renton was born in Fife, the son of Rev. John Renton and Janet Morrison (née Wemyss), a cousin of Sir James Wemyss Mackenzie, 5th Baronet. He was educated at the Glasgow Academy and the University of Edinburgh, where he took first class honours in the Legum Baccalaureus examination. He was called to the bar at Gray's Inn in 1885.

As a barrister in England, he did not acquire a large practice, but secured his reputation through his legal writings, including his 1896 book, Law and Practice of Lunacy. He was an editor of the 13-volume Encyclopaedia of English Law (1897), English Reports, and the Law Journal, and contributed many legal articles to the Encyclopædia Britannica.

In 1901, Renton was sent to Mauritius as Procureur and Advocate-General, and served as a judge on the island. In 1905, he was appointed to the Supreme Court of Ceylon. He was promoted to Chief Justice of Ceylon on 22 August 1914 succeeding Alfred Lascelles and was Chief Justice until 1918. He was succeeded by Anton Bertram.

In 1918, Renton returned to England with the intention of retiring; however, the Colonial Office sent him on a special mission to Nigeria and the Gold Coast Colony.

In 1919, the Foreign Office sent him to Egypt, where he was vice-president of the Egyptian Riots Indemnities Commission. He was subsequently appointed chairman of the Ceylon Salaries Commission (1921), the Irish Compensation Commission (1923), the Irish Grants Committee (1926).

He was made a member of the Privy Council in 1923.

== Personal life and honours ==
Renton was knighted in the 1915 Birthday Honours. He was appointed a Knight Commander of the Order of St Michael and St George (KCMG) in the 1925 Birthday Honours and promoted to Knight Grand Cross of the same order in the 1930 Birthday Honours.

In 1889, he married Elizabeth (née Jackson), with whom he had two daughters. He died in London, aged 71. In his obituary, The Times described him as a popular man: "Personally, he was much liked, and his Scottish humour was enhanced by the agreeable accent with which it was conveyed."

Legal offices
Preceded by Alfred Lascelles	Chief Justice of Ceylon; 1914–1918	Succeeded by Anton Bertram
