= Samuel Grenier =

Sir Samuel Grenier

17th Attorney General of Ceylon
- In office 30 September 1886 – 31 October 1892
- Governor: Sir Arthur Hamilton-Gordon
- Preceded by: Francis Flemming
- Succeeded by: Charles Layard

Personal details
- Born: John Charles Samuel Grenier; 16 June 1840 Jaffna, British Ceylon
- Died: 31 October 1892 (aged 52) Colombo, British Ceylon
- Spouse: Emily (Emma) Drieberg
- Relations: Frederick Charles Grenier (Father); Matilda Maria Aldons (Mother)
- Children: Emmie, Eleanor
- Occupation: Barrister

Sir John Charles Samuel Grenier (16 June 1840 - 31 October 1892) was a barrister and the 17th Attorney General of Ceylon. He was appointed on 30 September 1886, succeeding Francis Fleming, and held the office until his death in 1892. He was succeeded by Charles Layard.

Grenier was born in Jaffna, Ceylon on 16 June 1840, son of Frederick Charles Grenier, Secretary of the District Court, Jaffna. He started his career as a sub-editor on the Ceylon Examiner and later first secretary of the Colombo Municipality. He was called to the Ceylon Bar in 1864 and started his legal career acting as a Puisne Judge on the Supreme Court Bench. He was called to the English Bar in 1884 and appointed Attorney-General of Ceylon in 1886. He was knighted in 1891 in particular for this work on the Civil Procedure Code. Grenier died in Colombo, Ceylon on 31 October 1892 from pneumonia aged 52.

Legal offices
| Preceded by Francis Flemming | Attorney General of Ceylon; 1886–1892 | Succeeded by Charles Layard |
