= St John Branch =

Chief Justice of British Ceylon from 1925 to 1926 and colonial administrator

Sir Charles Ernest St John Branch KC

23rd Chief Justice of Ceylon
- In office 3 July 1925 – 25 May 1926
- Appointed by: William Manning
- Preceded by: Anton Bertram
- Succeeded by: Stanley Fisher

Chief Justice of Jamaica
- In office 1923–1925
- Preceded by: Sir Anthony Coll
- Succeeded by: Fiennes Barrett-Lennard

Personal details
- Born: 2 June 1865 Trinidad
- Died: 1939 Horsham, West Sussex, UK
- Children: Denzil Templer Branch
- Education: Durham University

Sir Charles Ernest St John Branch KC (2 June 1865 – 1939), known as St John Branch, was a British colonial administrator, who served as Chief Justice of Jamaica 1923-25 and the 23rd Chief Justice of Ceylon 1925-26.

== Career ==
Branch was born in San Ferdinand, Trinidad, the eldest son of Rev. Canon Branch.

He was assistant attorney-general of the British Leeward Islands in 1900. In 1910 he was made Auditor General of Jamaica and in 1921 a puisne judge in the Straits Settlements. In 1923 he returned to Jamaica as Chief Justice, a position he held until 1925. He was made a Knight Bachelor in the 1924 Birthday Honours.

On 3 July 1925 he was appointed Chief Justice of Ceylon, succeeding Anton Bertram, a position he held until 25 May 1926, when he was succeeded by Stanley Fisher.

He died in Horsham, West Sussex in 1939.

== Family ==
Branch married at Christ Church, Crookham, on 24 March 1900, to Agnes Irene Templer, daughter of Philip Arthur Templer, former Administrator of Dominica. They had two sons, the younger of which was killed in World War II.

Legal offices
Preceded by Anton Bertram	Chief Justice of Ceylon; 1925-1926	Succeeded by Stanley Fisher
Preceded by Sir Anthony Coll	Chief Justice of Jamaica; 1923-1925	Succeeded by Fiennes Barrett-Lennard
