= Elliot Bovill =

British lawyer and judge

Sir Elliot Charles Bovill
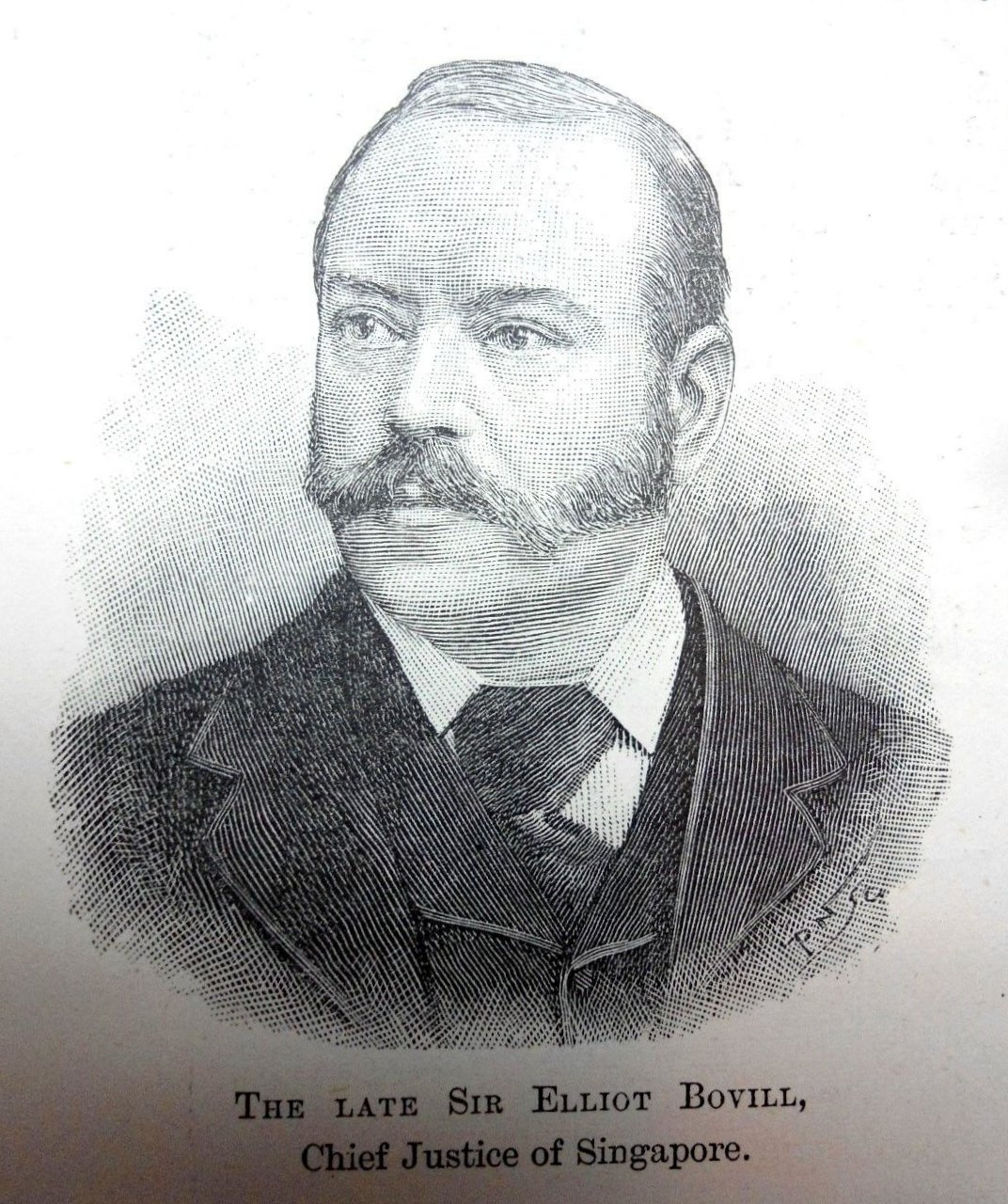
- Bovill as Chief Justice of Cyprus and the Straits Settlements

Chief Justice of the Straits Settlements
- In office 1892–1893
- Preceded by: Edward Loughlin O'Malley
- Succeeded by: Edward Osborne Esquire

Chief Justice of Cyprus
- In office 1883–1892
- Preceded by: Office established
- Succeeded by: Position abolished

Personal details
- Born: 23 April 1848 Clapham, Surrey, England
- Died: 24 March 1893 (aged 44) Singapore
- Spouse: Anna White
- Children: 3 (2 sons, 1 daughter)
- Education: Westminster School; Christ Church, Oxford
- Occupation: Lawyer, judge
- Awards: Knight Bachelor

Sir Elliot Charles Bovill (23 April 1848 – 24 March 1893) was a British lawyer and judge. He served as Chief Justice of Cyprus and the Straits Settlements in the late 19th century.

== Early life ==
Bovill was born in Clapham, at that time in Surrey, the fourth son of William Bovill, often confused with William John Bovill QC of Lincoln's Inn, and his wife, Lavinia Ann I'Anson, daughter of architect Edward I'Anson. He was educated at Westminster School and Christ Church, Oxford, graduating from the latter with honours in 1871. He was called to the Bar at Lincoln's Inn in 1873.

He married Anna White, the daughter of John Tahourdin White on 27 July 1876 at Kensington.

== Legal appointments ==
Bovill was appointed assistant Judicial Commissioner in Cyprus in 1875 soon after its cessation from Turkey to Britain. He was legal adviser to the government (the predecessor position to King's Advocate) from 1877 to 1881. He was appointed Judicial Commissioner in 1881 and Chief Justice in 1883 on creation of that position. He was knighted the following year, in 1884.

In 1890, it was reported that he was to be appointed Chief Justice of Western Australia. He declined the appointment. Instead, in 1892, he was appointed Chief Justice of the Straits Settlements on the departure of Edward Loughlin O'Malley. He first sat as Chief Justice in October 1892. His family made up of his wife and two boys and a daughter remained in Cyprus, planning to join him in Singapore later.

== Death ==
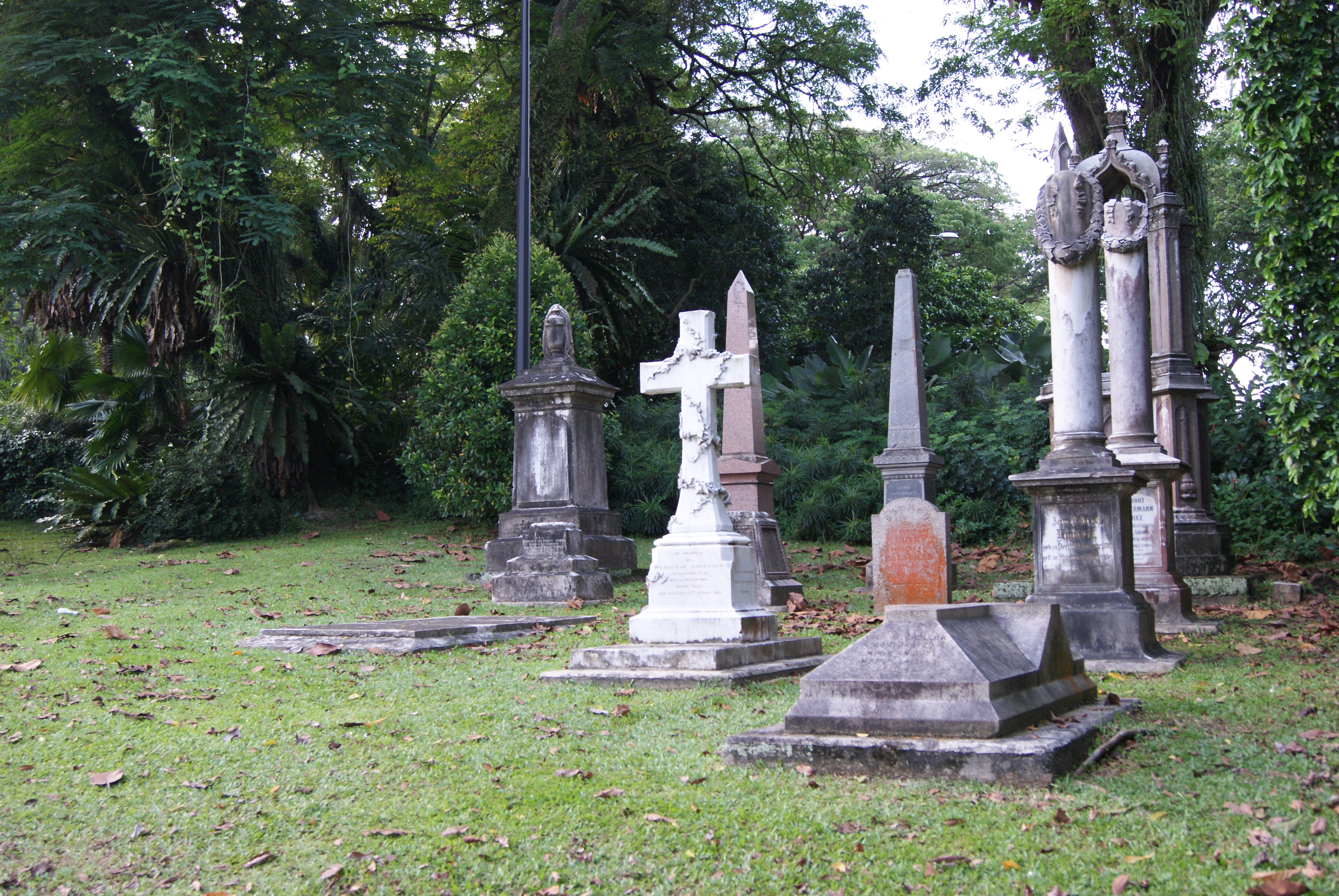
Gravestones in Fort Canning Green, Singapore. Bovill's gravestone is in front on the right.

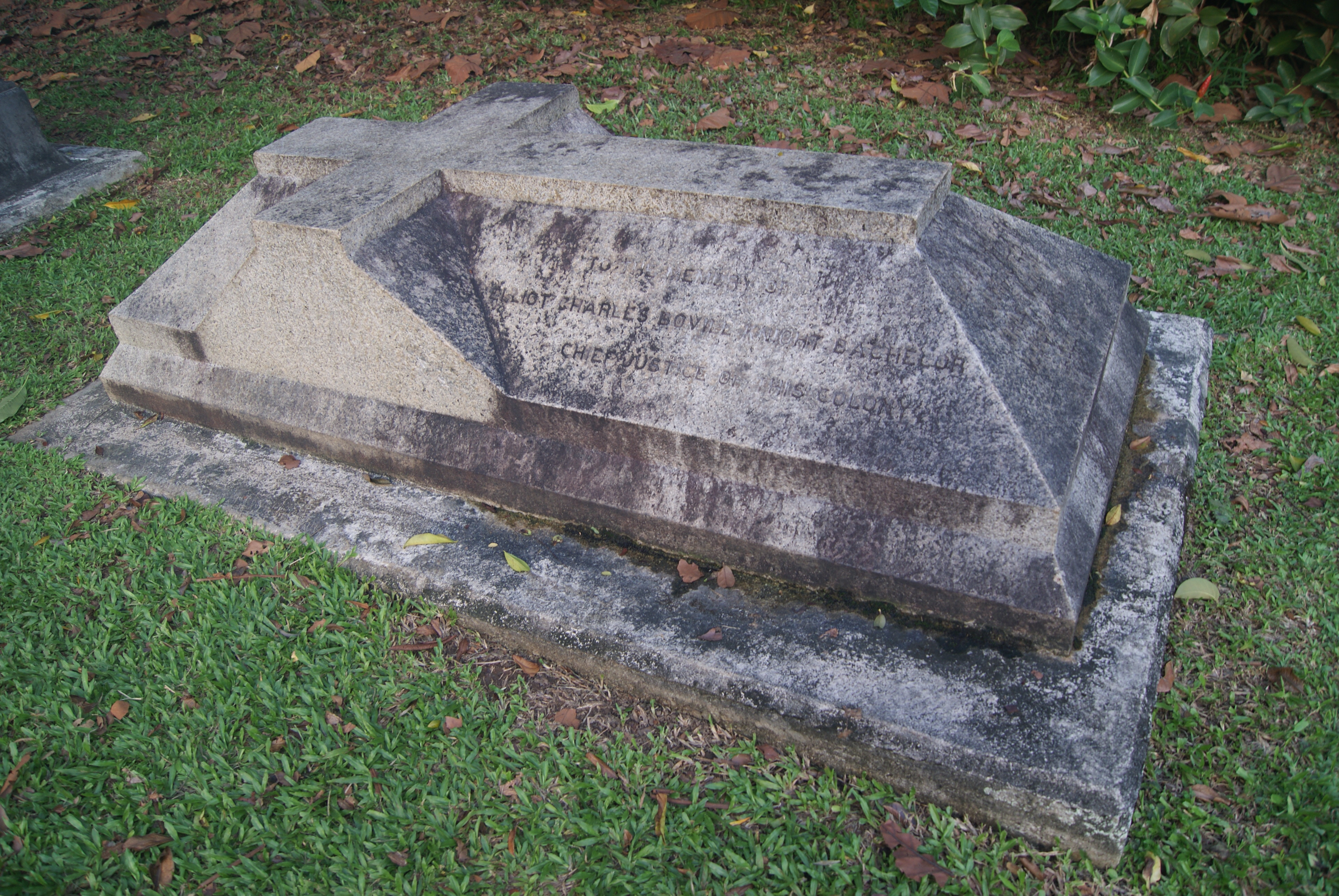
Bovill's gravestone

Bovill died at the age of 45 of cholera on 24 March 1893 at his residence in Paterson Road, Singapore, after returning from a trip to Malacca. He was buried at the Bukit Timah Cemetery.

His gravestone was moved to Fort Canning Green when the Bukit Timah Cemetery was closed. There is a commemorative plaque placed by Bovill's widow in St Andrew's Cathedral, Singapore.
