= Clinton Bernard =

Trinidadian judge (died 2019)

Clinton Bernard (May 31, 1930 – 26 October 2019) was a Chief Justice of Trinidad and Tobago from 1985 to 1995. In 2018, he came into public light again after he released his autobiography and openly lamented the poor pension system provided for former high office holders and how it had affected him.
