= John Alexander Strachey Bucknill =

Attorney General of Hong Kong

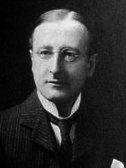
John Alexander Strachey Bucknill

Sir John Alexander Strachey Bucknill KC (14 September 1873 – 6 October 1926) was a British lawyer and Judge. He served as Attorney General of Hong Kong, Chief Justice of the Straits Settlements and Puisne Judge in Patna, India.

== Early life ==
Bucknill was born in Clifton, Bristol, England on 14 September 1873. He was the son of Sir Thomas Townsend Bucknill a Justice of the High Court in England. His younger half-brother was Sir Alfred Townsend Bucknill (1880–1963), who became a High Court Judge in England and in 1945 was appointed a Privy Councillor.

Bucknill was educated at Charterhouse School and Keble College, Oxford where he took honours in the Natural Science School. He was called to the Bar at the Inner Temple in 1896 and practiced on the Midland Circuit until 1902.

In 1901 Bucknill married Alice, youngest daughter of Admiral Sir George Henry Richards FRS. They had three daughters, Mary Alice Hare (born 1902 Epsom), Honor Bell (born 1904) and Elizabeth (born 1909).

== Legal appointments ==
In 1902, just after the Boer War, Bucknill was appointed Commissioner of Patents in the newly established Transvaal Colony and also served on the legislature.

In 1907 he was appointed King's Advocate in Cyprus.

From 1912 to 1914 he served as Attorney General of Hong Kong. He was appointed a King's Counsel in 1913 while in Hong Kong.

Bucknill was appointed Chief Justice of the Straits Settlements in 1914 and served in that position until 1920. In Singapore he was Chairman of the committee to arrange for the celebration of the Centenary of Sir Stamford Raffles and was also Chairman of the Raffles Museum and Library Committee.

In 1920, "somewhat to the surprise of his friends" Bucknill resigned as Chief Justice to accept a position as Puisne Judge on the Patna High Court in Patna, India. Bucknill, in a ceremony to farewell him in the Singapore Supreme Court, said that he was sorry to go, but "the pay and possibilities in India are so much greater than anything which obtains in Colonial service that it is impracticable for me, with my family responsibilities, to refuse the new position offered to me."

== Personal interests ==
Bucknill was a keen ornithologist and lepidopterist. In 1900, he published The Birds of Surrey. During his later years, he wrote books on the birds of Cyprus and Singapore and other books on coins. He also became president of the Numismatic Society of India.

== Death ==
Bucknill died in office at his home in Patna on 6 October 1926. He was 53 years old.
