= Thomas Bucknill =

British judge (1845–1915)

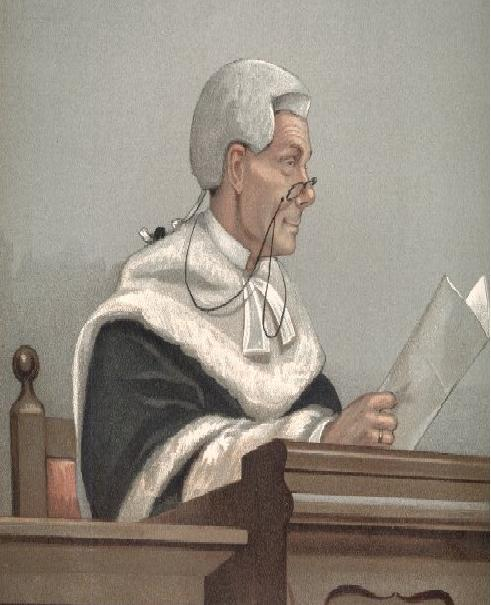
Mr Justice Bucknill as caricatured by 'Spy' in 1900

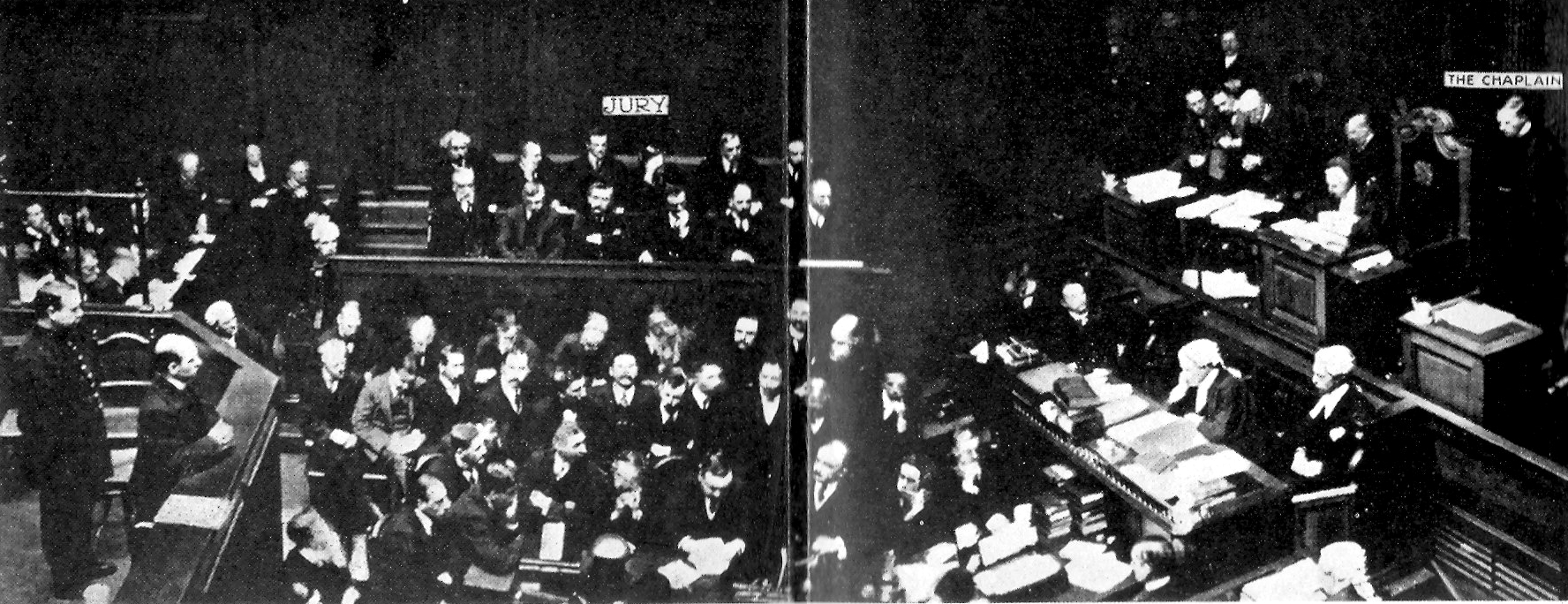
Mr Justice Bucknill sentencing Frederick Seddon to death in 1912. This is the only known photograph of the death sentence being pronounced in England.

Sir Thomas Townsend Bucknill (18 April 1845 – 4 October 1915) was an English judge of the Victorian and Edwardian eras, a Member of Parliament and a Privy Councillor.

== Biography ==
'Tommy' Bucknill was born at Exminster in 1845, the second son of Sir John Charles Bucknill, an asylum doctor and psychiatrist who was knighted in 1894 in recognition of his services as one of the founders of the Volunteer Movement. Thomas Bucknill was educated at Westminster School and afterwards at Geneva. He was called to the bar in 1868, became a Queen's Counsel in 1885, and a bencher of the Inner Temple in 1891. From 1885 to 1899 he was Recorder of Exeter. He edited The Cunningham Reports and Sir S. Cook's Common Pleas Reports, and was a leading Counsel on the Admiralty Circuit and on the Western Circuit. He sat as the Conservative Member of Parliament for Epsom from 1892 to 1899, in which year he was raised to the bench, succeeding Sir Henry Hawkins, and was knighted. In 1914 he was appointed a Privy Councillor.

Bucknill was a prominent Freemason, having been initiated in 1873 into Lodge of Good Report No.136 and becoming the Provincial Grand Master for Surrey from 1903 to 1915.

Among the notable cases tried before Bucknill was that in 1912 of poisoner Frederick Seddon, who, on being found guilty of murder appealed directly to Bucknill as a brother Mason and in the name of 'The Great Architect Of The Universe' to overturn the jury's verdict. According to some sources he gave the First Degree sign, according to others the Sign of Grief and Distress, begging for mercy. Bucknill is reported as having said, with some emotion:

"It is not for me to harrow your feelings – try to make peace with your Maker. We both belong to the same Brotherhood, and though that can have no influence with me this is painful beyond words to have to say what I am saying, but our Brotherhood does not encourage crime, it condemns it."

Bucknill died at Hylands House, Epsom on 4 October 1915.

He was the father of Sir Alfred Townsend Bucknill (1880–1963), also a High Court Judge and who became a Privy Councillor in 1945 and John Alexander Strachey Bucknill who served as Chief Justice of the Straits Settlements and Puisne Judge in Patna, India.

== Arms ==
Coat of arms of Thomas Bucknill

Motto
Deo Omnia

== Portrayals ==
- In the 1981 Granada Television series Lady Killers Christopher Banks played Bucknill in an episode entitled Root of All Evil.

== Notes ==
Parliament of the United Kingdom
Preceded by George Cubitt	Member of Parliament for Epsom; 1892–1899	Succeeded by William Keswick
