= William James Smith =

British lawyer

Sir William James Smith (1853–1912) was a British jurist who served as the chief justice of the Supreme Court of Cyprus, British Guiana and the Transvaal. He was knighted by letters patent in 1896.

Smith was born in 1853 and was educated at Trinity Hall, Cambridge, he was called to the bar at Lincoln's Inn in 1875. He became the Puisne Judge of the Gold Coast Colony when he was aged 27. Smith moved to Cyprus in 1882 as Judge of the Supreme Court before becoming the Chief Justice. From 1897 he was Chief Justice of British Guiana. In late 1902 he was appointed Judge of the Transvaal high court.

Smith married in 1896 to Ella March. He died in London on 15 November 1912 aged 59.
