= Chief Justice of Trinidad and Tobago =

Highest judge of the state Trinidad and Tobago

The chief justice of Trinidad and Tobago is the highest judge of the Republic of Trinidad and Tobago and presides over the Supreme Court of Judicature of Trinidad and Tobago. The chief justice is appointed by a common decision of the President, the prime minister and the leader of the opposition.

== History ==
Tobago was claimed for England already by King James I in 1608, however in the following time saw varying rulers. In 1794, a planter was elected the first chief justice. The island was eventually ceded to the United Kingdom in 1814 at the Treaty of Paris and from 1833 it was assigned to the colony of the British Windward Islands.

In 1797, Trinidad, who had been previously controlled by the Spanish Crown, was captured by a fleet commanded by Sir Ralph Abercromby and thus came under the rule of the British government. The post of a chief justice was established in March of the same year. Both islands, Trinidad and Tobago were incorporated into a single colony in 1888, which gained its independence in 1962.

== Chief justices of Tobago ==
- 1794–1799: John Balfour (non-lawyer)
- 1799–1804: Robert Paterson (non-lawyer)
- 1805–1828 ?: Elphinstone Pigott
- 1828–1832 No appointment
- 1832–1833: Richard Newton Bennett
- 1833–? G. Buchanan - substitute for Robert Sympson Jameson
- 1840–1841: Robert Nicholas Fynn
- 1841–1861: Edward Dyer Sanderson
- 1862–1867: Henry Iles Woodcock
- 1868–1880: Joseph King Wattley, Jnr
- 1880–1882: James Sherrard Armstrong
- 1882–1888: John Worrell Carrington

== Chief judges of Trinidad ==
- 1797–1808: John Nihell
- 1808–1811: George Smith
- 1814–1818: John Thomas Bigge
- 1818–1830: Ashton Warner

== Chief justices of Trinidad ==
- 1669–?: Juan Fermin de Huidobro
- 1832–1849: George Scotland
- 1849–1869: William George Knox
- 1870–1885: Joseph Needham
- 1886–1888: Sir John Gorrie

== Chief justices of Trinidad and Tobago ==
- 1888–1892: Sir John Gorrie
- 1892–1899: John Tankerville Goldney
- 1900–1903: Sir William John Anderson
- 1903–1907: Ernest Augustus Northcote
- 1908–1924: Alfred van Waterschoodt Lucie-Smith
- 1924–1926: Sir Stanley Fisher (afterwards Chief Justice of Ceylon, 1926)
- 1927–1930: Sir Philip James Macdonell (afterwards Chief Justice of Ceylon, 1930)
- 1930–1937: Charles Frederic Belcher
- 1937–1943: Charles Cyril Gerahty
- 1943–1946: Henry William Butler Blackall
- 1946–1952: Cecil Furness-Smith
- 1952–1958: Joseph Leon Mathieu Perez
- 1958–1960: Stanley Eugene Gomes (afterwards Chief Justice of the West Indies Federation, 1961)
- 1961–1962: Arthur Hugh McShine (acting)
- 1962 - Trinidad and Tobago became independent as a Dominion / Commonwealth realm
- 1962–1968: Sir Hugh Olliviere Beresford Wooding
- 1969–1970: Arthur Hugh McShine
- 1970–1971: Clement Phillips (acting)
- 1972–1983: Sir Isaac Hyatali
- 1976 - Trinidad and Tobago is declared as the Republic of Trinidad and Tobago
- 1983–1985: Cecil Kelsick
- 1985–1995: Clinton Bernard
- 1995–2002: Michael de la Bastide
- 2002–2008: Satnarine Sharma
- 2008–2025: Ivor Archie
- 2025-present: Ronnie Boodoosingh
