= Alfred Townsend Bucknill =

English judge

Bucknill in 1936.

Sir Alfred Townsend Bucknill, OBE, PC (19 December 1880 – 22 December 1963), was an English judge and a Privy Councillor. Specialising in maritime law, he presided over a number of boards of enquiry into naval events during the Second World War.

== Early life ==
Alfred was born in Epsom, the son of Thomas Townsend Bucknill, a judge and Member of Parliament, and Annie Bell (née Ford). He was educated at Charterhouse School and Trinity College, Oxford and was called to the Bar in 1903. During the First World War, he was an officer in the Surrey Yeomanry and served in France and Egypt, later serving as a staff officer in Ireland. Alfred became a judge and was knighted in 1935, specialising in probate and shipping.

== Boards of enquiry ==
In June 1939, Bucknill was appointed the president of the board of enquiry into the loss of the new submarine HMS Thetis, which sank during trials with the loss of 99 lives. Bucknill presided over further boards; for the sinking of the battlecruiser HMS Repulse and the battleship HMS Prince of Wales by Japanese aircraft off Malaya in December 1941. Bucknill also presided over the inquiry into the Channel Dash in February 1942, when three large German warships had traversed the English Channel almost unscathed.

== Family life ==
Alfred married Brenda Boulnois (1879–1953) in 1905. They had two children at their home in Chelsea, London; Margaret, born 1908 and Peter Thomas, born 1910.
