= Joseph Leon Mathieu Perez =

Judge

Joseph Leon Mathieu Perez (born c.1896) was a judge from Trinidad and Tobago who was appointed by Elizabeth II as the Chief Justice of Trinidad and Tobago from 1952 to 1958. He also served as Assistant Law Officer.

== Honour ==
He was knighted on 15 July 1955. He was knighted by Elizabeth II as Knight Bachelor.
