= Francis Fleming (colonial administrator) =

British administrator (1842-1922)

Sir Francis Fleming KCMG
- Portrait by Walter Stoneman, c. 1916

16th Attorney General of Ceylon
- In office 4 July 1883 – 1886
- Governor: Arthur Hamilton-Gordon
- Preceded by: Bruce Burnside
- Succeeded by: Samuel Grenier

12th Attorney General of Barbados
- In office 1878–1882
- Preceded by: John Sealy
- Succeeded by: William Conrad Reeves

8th Colonial Secretary of Hong Kong
- In office 17 January 1890 – 26 February 1892
- Monarch: Queen Victoria
- Preceded by: Frederick Stewart
- Succeeded by: G. T. M. O'Brien

Personal details
- Born: Francis Fleming; 31 July 1842 Middlesex, England
- Died: 4 December 1922 (aged 80) South Kensington, London, England
- Citizenship: British
- Spouse: Constance Mary Kavanagh (1858–1950)
- Children: Sec.-Lieut. Hugh Joseph Fleming (1895–1916)
- Occupation: British colonial administrator

Sir Francis Fleming, CMG, KCMG (31 July 1842 – 4 December 1922) (Chinese: 菲林明) was a British lawyer and colonial administrator who held appointments in eleven colonies.

== Early life and education ==
The son of James Fleming (1812–1887), Q.C. of Dorset Square and Julia Matilda (1811–1875) daughter of Major John Canning (1775–1824) and niece of Francis Canning (1769–1831) of Foxcote Warwick.

He attended Downside School near Bath, studied law at the Middle Temple, and became a barrister in 1866.

== Career ==
Three years later, from 28 April 1869, he became acting District and Stipendiary Magistrate in Mauritius earning £700 per annum, successively followed by Crown Solicitor (from 15 April 1872), acting District and Stipendiary Magistrate in Savanne (2 November 1872), acting District and Stipendiary Magistrate, and Poor Law Guardian in Flacq (1 March 1873), District and Stipendiary Magistrate in Black River (1 January 1874), and acting District and Stipendiary Magistrate in Moka. Whilst in Mauritius he also went to Seychelles as acting District Judge for four months.

From then held a succession of posts as district judge in Jamaica (1876-1878); Attorney-General of Barbados and acting Chief Justice (from 1878); and acting Chief Justice of St. Lucia.

This was followed in 1880 as private secretary to Sir G. C. Strahan, administering the Government of the Cape, and in 1881, removed to British Guiana as a Puisne Judge from 1882 to 1883. In 1883 was transferred to Ceylon as a Queen's Advocate, later becoming Attorney-General and acting Chief Justice.

It was December 1886, as he was to be awarded the Order of St Michael and St George, he returned to Mauritius to take up the roles as colonial secretary and administrator (acting governor) from 24 February 1887 to December 1888.

For over a year he was Colonial Secretary of Hong Kong between 1890 and 1892 (years later Fleming Road in Wan Chai, Hong Kong was named after him).

While Governor-in-Chief at Sierra Leone, from 16 May 1892 to January 1894, he witnessed in November 1892 the first systematic strike of the 800 underpaid labouring men of the Royal Engineers' Department in the history of that colony. He wrote that in his opinion the striking workers were "entirely in the right" and that their demands were "wholly justifiable" and "reasonable." He ruled in their favor and raised their pay. The previous governor, John Joseph Crooks, disagreed with Fleming and referred to the raise in pay as a "capitulation." Throughout 1893 there were a number of times in which native leaders from the Mende, Sherbro and Temne communities took their concerns directly to Fleming who proved willing to listen. This reputation largely started with his listening to the striking workers.

Fleming assumed the post as governor of the Leeward Islands from January 1894 where he remained till his retirement in 1901.

== Personal life and death ==
Fleming was knighted on 1 January 1892 and, in the same year, he married Constance Mary Kavanagh (1858–1950), Constance was the daughter of Maurice Dennis Kavanagh (1821–1899) and Mary Constantia née Clifford (1825–1898) and granddaughter of Hugh Clifford, 7th Baron Clifford of Chudleigh. Their only son, Hugh Joseph (born 26 Jan 1895 in Warwick), became a second lieutenant and was killed in action during World War I on 24 August 1916 at Nord-Pas-de-Calais, France.

Fleming died at the age of 80 at home at 9 Sydney Place, South Kensington, on 4 December 1922. His will was probated the following month; his widow survived him by nearly three decades.

Government offices
Preceded by Frederick Stewart	Colonial Secretary of Hong Kong; 1890-1892	Succeeded by George Thomas Michael O'Brien
Preceded by Sir William Frederick Haynes Smith	Governor of the Leeward Islands; 1895–1901	Succeeded by Sir Henry Moore Jackson
