= Isaac Hyatali =

Trinbagonian lawyer

Sir Isaac Emanuel Hyatali was the Chief Justice of the Republic of Trinidad and Tobago from 1972 until 1983. He was knighted as a Knight Bachelor by Queen Elizabeth II in 1973. He died of diverticular disease on 2 December 2000.

== Education ==
After attending Naparima College, he was admitted to practice law at the Court of Gray’s Inn in London in 1947.
