= Edward Loughlin O'Malley =

British lawyer and judge

Sir Edward Loughlin O'Malley
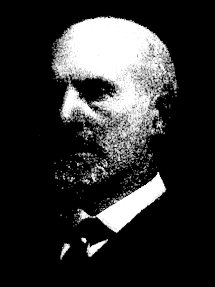
- Sir Edward Loughlin O'Malley

Chief Judge of the HBM Supreme Consular Court in the Ottoman Empire
- In office 1898–1903

Chief Justice of British Guiana
- In office 1895–1898

Chief Justice of the Straits Settlements
- In office 1889–1892
- Preceded by: Sir Thomas Sidgreaves
- Succeeded by: Elliot Bovill

Attorney General of Hong Kong
- In office 1879–1889
- Preceded by: Julian Pauncefote
- Succeeded by: Thomas Hayllar

Attorney General of Jamaica
- In office 1876–1879

Personal details
- Born: 17 February 1842
- Died: 16 August 1932 (aged 90) Cuddesdon, Oxfordshire, England
- Spouse: Emma Winifred Hardcastle
- Children: Owen O'Malley and Charles Loughlin Meyler Brent O'Malley
- Education: Trinity College, Cambridge (B.A., M.A.)
- Occupation: Lawyer, judge

Sir Edward Loughlin O'Malley (17 February 1842 – 16 August 1932) was a British lawyer and judge. He served as attorney general and chief justice of a number of British colonies in the late 19th and early 20th centuries. His last position before retirement was as chief justice of the British Supreme consular court in the Ottoman Empire.

== Early life ==
O'Malley was born into an Anglo-Irish family on 17 February 1842, the son of Peter Frederick O'Malley, QC. The O'Malley family were originally from County Mayo in the west of Ireland. He was educated at Trinity College, Cambridge (B.A. 1864, M.A. 1868) and called to the Bar at the Middle Temple in 1866 and practised on the Norfolk and South Eastern Circuits. He ran unsuccessfully for the seat of Bedford as a Conservative candidate in 1868.

== Family ==
In 1869, he married Emma Winifred Hardcastle, daughter of Joseph Hardcastle, MP. Emma was a botanist and collected plants in Hong Kong and Jamaica. Her plants are in the British Museum (Natural History). One of the couple's sons, Owen, became a senior British diplomat. The other son, Charles Loughlin Meyler Brent O'Malley, was a lieutenant colonel in the Royal Artillery.

== Legal appointments ==
O'Malley was appointed Attorney General of Jamaica in 1876. Then from 1879 to 1889 he was Attorney General of Hong Kong. As Attorney General, O'Malley was allowed to accept private cases which did not conflict with his official position. In 1881, he, together with Thomas Hayllar, QC, were engaged by the Imperial Maritime Customs to defend, in the British Supreme Court for China and Japan sitting at Canton, a British employee of the customs service, Edward Page, who was accused of murder for killing a Chinese smuggler. J. J. Francis, also from Hong Kong, acted as the Crown Advocate in place of Nicholas Hannen who was on leave.

In 1889, O'Malley was appointed Chief Justice of the Straits Settlements (Singapore). He was knighted in 1891.

In 1892, he returned to England on home leave and did not return to Singapore. Sir Elliot Bovill was appointed in his place. He later served as Chief Justice of British Guiana from 1895 until 1898 when he was appointed Chief Judge of HBM Supreme Consular Court in the Ottoman Empire. In 1900 he was advanced to be Chief Judge of the Supreme Consular Court for the Dominions of the Sublime Ottoman Porte. (The Porte was the government of the Ottoman Empire).

== Retirement ==
O'Malley retired in 1903. In 1909, he was appointed a Royal Commissioner to enquire into the condition and resources of Mauritius. In 1903, he was named as a Liberal candidate for Bury St Edmunds. He ran, instead, unsuccessfully, as a Liberal candidate for Kensington, South in the 1906 General Election. In 1910, he unsuccessfully stood for the seat of Lewisham.

== Death ==
He died in 1932, aged 90, at his residence, Denton House, in Cuddesdon, Oxfordshire, and was buried in Cuddesdon. A memorial to O'Malley (and his father) was erected by his sons in the ruins of Murrisk Abbey at Murrisk in County Mayo, Ireland.
