= Herbert Stronge =

British lawyer and colonial judge

Sir Herbert Cecil Stronge, KC (3 January 1875 – 22 August 1963) was an Anglo-Irish barrister and British colonial judge.

== Life and career ==
Stronge was born in 1875 in Kilkee, County Clare, the son of S. E. Stronge, MA, ISO, and Minnie L. Stronge. He was educated at the Falmouth School and Trinity College, Dublin, where he took a BA and was Prizeman in Classics and English Literature.

He was called to the Irish Bar in 1900 and joined the North-East Circuit in 1901, practising in Belfast.

He was appointed as a stipendiary magistrate in the Bahamas in 1911, and acted as Attorney-General of the Bahamas in 1914 and 1915. From 1917 to 1925, he was Chief Justice of the Tonga Protectorate. From 1925 to 1931, he was Chief Justice of the Leeward Islands. From 1931 until his retirement in 1938 he was Chief Justice of Cyprus.

Stronge became a King's Counsel when he took silk in 1929, and was knighted in 1930.

Stronge died in Durban, South Africa in 1963.

== Sources ==
- https://www.ukwhoswho.com/view/10.1093/ww/9780199540891.001.0001/ww-9780199540884-e-50763
