= Anton Bertram =

Chief Justice of British Ceylon from 1918 to 1925

Sir Thomas Anton Bertram KC

22nd Chief Justice of Ceylon
- In office 26 July 1918 – 1925
- Appointed by: John Anderson
- Preceded by: Alexander Wood Renton
- Succeeded by: Charles Ernest St. John Branch

5th Attorney General of Ceylon
- In office 19 May 1911 – 1918
- Governor: Henry McCallum
- Preceded by: Alfred Lascelles
- Succeeded by: Henry Gollan

Personal details
- Born: 8 February 1869 Barnstable, Devon, England
- Died: 17 September 1937 (aged 68) Canterbury, Kent, England
- Education: University of Cambridge

Sir Thomas Anton Bertram KC (8 February 1869 – 17 September 1937) was an English Barrister and the 22nd Chief Justice of Ceylon. He was appointed on 26 July 1918 succeeding Alexander Wood Renton and was Chief Justice until 1925. He was succeeded by Charles Ernest St. John Branch.

== Life ==
Bertram was born in Barnstable, Devon, on 8 February 1869, the son of the Reverend R. A. Bertram, a Congregational minister. He was educated at Gonville and Caius College, Cambridge. He was called to the bar in 1893. He married Edith Marion, C.B.E. (1919), daughter of formerly Mayor of Cardiff Rees Jones, J.P., of Porthkerry House, Barry, Glamorganshire in October 1902. He appointed Attorney-General of The Bahamas in July 1902. In 1907 he was appointed a Puisne Judge in Cyprus and then Attorney-General of Ceylon in 1911.

Bertram died at his home in Canterbury, Kent, on 17 September 1937, aged 68.

Legal offices
Preceded by Alexander Wood Renton	Chief Justice of Ceylon; 1918-1925	Succeeded by Charles Ernest St. John Branch
Preceded by Alfred Lascelles	Attorney General of Ceylon; 1911-1918	Succeeded by Henry Gollan
