= Chief Justice of Singapore =

Highest post in the judicial system of Singapore

Chief Justice of the Republic of Singapore
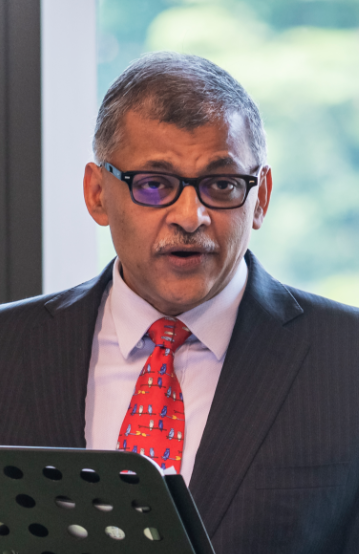
- Incumbent; Sundaresh Menon since 6 November 2012
- Supreme Court of Singapore
- Style: Chief Justice (informal); The Honourable (formal)
- Nominator: Prime Minister of Singapore
- Appointer: President of Singapore
- Term length: Tenure until the age of 65
- Constituting instrument: Constitution of Singapore, Article 94
- Inaugural holder: Wee Chong Jin
- Formation: 9 August 1965; 61 years ago
- Website: supremecourt.gov.sg

The chief justice of Singapore is the presiding member of the Supreme Court of Singapore. It is the highest office in the judicial system of Singapore, appointed by the president, on the advice of the prime minister. Under the constitution, the chief justice serve this position until they turn 65, or earlier if they die, resign, retire, or facing conviction.

Since the role was established in 1965, four people have served as Chief Justice, beginning with Wee Chong Jin who held this title for 25 years. The incumbent chief justice is Sundaresh Menon, the first Singaporean-born chief justice, who took office on 6 November 2012. Menon is expected to retire by 26 February 2027 (his 65th birthday) to Sushil Nair.

== History ==
Prior to 1959, the chief justice was appointed by the governor of Singapore, when Singapore was still a Crown colony part of the British Empire.

== List of chief justices (1965–present) ==
=== Chief justices of the Republic of Singapore ===
| # | Portrait | Chief Justice of the Republic of Singapore | Took office | Left office |
|---|---|---|---|---|
| 1 | | Wee Chong Jin | 9 August 1965 | 27 September 1990 |
| 2 | | Yong Pung How | 28 September 1990 | 10 April 2006 |
| 3 | | Chan Sek Keong | 11 April 2006 | 5 November 2012 |
| 4 | | Sundaresh Menon | 6 November 2012 | 26 February 2027 (planned) |
| 5 | | Sushil Nair | 27 February 2027 (planned) | incumbent |

== List of chief justices (1867–1965) ==
=== Chief justices of the Straits Settlements ===
| # | Chief Justice of the Straits Settlements | Took office | Left office |
|---|---|---|---|
| 1 | Sir Peter Benson Maxwell | 1867 | 1871 |
| 2 | Sir Thomas Sidgreaves | 1871 | 1886 |
| 3 | Sir Theodore Thomas Ford | 1886 | 1890 |
| 4 | Sir Edward Loughlin O'Malley | 1890 | 1892 |
| 5 | Sir Elliot Bovill | 1892 | 1893 |
| 6 | Sir John Winfield Bonser | 1893 | 1893 |
| 7 | Sir W. H. Lionel Cox | 1893 | 1906 |
| 8 | Sir William Henry Hyndman Jones | 1906 | 1914 |
| 9 | Sir John Alexander Strachey Bucknill | 1914 | 1920 |
| 10 | Sir G. Aubrey Goodman | 1920 | 1920 |
| 11 | Sir Walter Shaw | 1921 | 1925 |
| 12 | Sir James William Murison | 1925 | 1933 |
| 13 | Sir Walter Huggard | 1933 | 1936 |
| 14 | Sir Percy Alexander McElwaine | 1936 | 1946 |

=== Chief justices of the Colony of Singapore ===
| # | Chief Justice of the Colony of Singapore | Took office | Left office |
|---|---|---|---|
| – | Cecil William Victor Carey | 1946 | 1946 |
| 1 | Sir Charles Murray-Aynsley | 1946 | 1955 |
| 2 | Sir John Whyatt | 1955 | 1958 |
| 3 | Sir Alan Rose, KCMG | 1958 | 1959 |

=== Chief justices of the State of Singapore ===
| # | Chief Justice of the State of Singapore | Took office | Left office |
|---|---|---|---|
| 1 | Sir Alan Rose | 1959 | 1963 |
| 2 | Wee Chong Jin | 5 January 1963 | 8 August 1965 |

== See also ==
- President of Singapore
- Prime Minister of Singapore
- Attorney-General of Singapore
