= Conrad Reeves =

Barbadian politician

Sir William Conrad Reeves (Saint Joseph, Barbados 1821 (Note: His year of birth is listed as 1838 in Who´s Who; as 1827 in his obituary in The Times of 31 January 1902; and in other sources as 1821.) – Barbados, 8 January 1902), was a nineteenth century journalist, lawyer, and politician in Barbados. He served as his country's Solicitor-General from 1874 to 1876, Attorney-General from 1882 to 1886, and Chief Justice from 1886 to 1902.

== Early life and education ==
Reeves was born in 1821 in Barbados, one of three sons of Thomas Phillipps Reeves, a medical practitioner, and a slave, Peggy Phyllis. Reeves was raised by his father’s sister and privately educated.

Reeves went to work at The Liberal newspaper. He was a legal reporter at the Barbados Agricultural Reporter covering the House of Assembly when he resigned to study law. In 1860, Reeves went to England. He was patronised with funds collected by the black community, to stay in the United Kingdom, to study at the Middle Temple.

== Legal and political career ==
Reeves was called to the Bar of England and Wales in 1863 and the Barbados Bar in 1864. He served as Attorney-General of St. Vincent briefly in 1867.

In 1874, he became the representative for the parish of Saint Joseph in the House of Assembly and was appointed Solicitor-General of Barbados. In 1876, he opposed proposals by Governor John Pope-Hennessy to federate Barbados and the Windward Islands, attracting large public support and resigned as Solicitor-General. In 1878, he opposed similar proposals to reform the House of Assembly by adding Crown-nominated members.

In 1882, Reeves was appointed Attorney-General and, in 1883, he was made Queen's Counsel. He served as Attorney General of Barbados from 1882 to 1886.

In 1886, Reeves became the first black Chief Justice of Barbados. He served in this position until his death in 1902. In 1889, Reeves was knighted by Queen Victoria, and became the first Barbadian, and the first black man, to be knighted by a British sovereign.

== Personal life and death ==
In 1868, Reeves married Margaret Rudder, the daughter of J. T. R. Rudder. The couple had one daughter.

Reeves died on 9 January 1902 at his home in St. Michael’s, Bridgetown and was afforded a public funeral. He was survived by his daughter.
