= Ann Bridge =

English writer and mountain climber

- Born: Mary Ann Dolling Sanders; 11 September 1889; Porters, near Shenley, Hertfordshire, England
- Died: 9 March 1974 (aged 84); Oxford, England
- Occupations: Author and mountain climber

Ann Bridge (11 September 1889 – 9 March 1974) is the pseudonym of Mary Ann Dolling (Sanders), Lady O'Malley, also known as Cottie Sanders. Bridge wrote 14 novels, mostly based on her experiences living in foreign countries, one book of short stories, a mystery series, and several autobiographical non-fiction books.

== Early life ==
The seventh of eight children of an English father, James Harris Sanders (1844–1916), and an American mother from Louisiana, Marie Louise Day (1852–1923), she was named Mary Ann Dolling Sanders and later nicknamed "Cottie". Her father was a successful international salesman of metal products. In 1900, her parents took all their children on an overseas trip to Paris and Switzerland, and Cottie Sanders, "born with an inexplicable craving for heights," was enchanted by the Alps and became interested in mountain climbing. The family continued to spend summers in Switzerland.

The Sanders family moved to London in 1904, when the father encountered financial difficulties. Sanders passed the entrance exams to enter Oxford University, but did not attend, instead staying home to help her mother recover from the death of a son. She lamented missing "the mental discipline and the serious scholarship a University can give." Intellectually, she described herself as "half-baked." By 1911, her father had lost almost all of his fortune, and the family moved into a six-room flat in London. Sanders went to work as an assistant secretary for the Charity Organization Society. She described herself during this period as poor but happy.

In 1913, on a visit to Argyll, Sanders met Owen St. Clair O'Malley, a British diplomat. They were married on 25 October 1913. The couple had two daughters and a son. The marriage was apparently not a happy one. She was described as "stormy, troubled, and troublesome" and "an unloved wife who made herself 'one of the best-loved of all women novelists' in the twentieth century."

A dust jacket of one of her books in 1949 stated that "she became the youngest member of the Alpine Club at the age of 19, with sixteen first-class ascents to her credit. She is a great gardener; she has an interest in and knowledge of archaeology rare in her sex; and she has deep learning in her own craft of writing."

== Friendship with George Mallory ==
In 1909, Cottie Sanders met mountain climber George Mallory in Zermatt, Switzerland. The two became close friends and mountain climbing partners. Sanders shared Mallory's "mystical love of the mountains." The relationship between the two is elusive. She was a "climbing friend" or a "casual sweetheart." She called him the first friend she had made on her own. When Mallory died on Mount Everest in 1924, Sanders wrote a memoir of him. Her memoir was never published, but it provided much of the material used by later biographers such as David Pye and David Robertson and a novel Everest Dream.

== Travels and literary career ==
In 1919, the O'Malleys moved to Bridge End, a hamlet in Ockham, Surrey. Cottie Sanders O'Malley later took the name of the hamlet, "Bridge," as part of her pen name, along with her middle name Ann. In 1925 she and her children accompanied her husband abroad to a diplomatic posting in Beijing, China. She returned to England in 1927 because of a sick child and began writing to supplement the couple's income. In 1932, her first, and best known novel, Peking Picnic, was published under her pseudonym of Ann Bridge. It was a success and won the Atlantic Monthly prize of $10,000. She followed that novel up with several others that featured restless, upper-class heroines in exotic environments. She visited Albania twice in 1934 and in 1936 which resulted in the novel Singing Waters. She lived with her husband in several countries besides China, including Turkey, Portugal, and Hungary. In 1941 during World War II, fleeing German advances, the O'Malleys escaped via the Trans-Siberian Railroad and Cottie, or Ann Bridge, spent a year in the US before returning to Turkey.

Bridge's novel Illyrian Spring (1935) is credited with increasing tourism to Yugoslavia. Frontier Passage (1942) was a source of information used by British intelligence to set up a World War II anti-German resistance movement in Spain. The Dark Moment (1951) traces the decline of the Ottoman Empire and the role of women in the revolution.

In her later years, Bridge turned more toward writing auto-biographical works and a mystery series featuring an amateur sleuth named Julia Probyn and set in several different countries. One of her last books was Moments of Knowing about her experiences with the paranormal.

== Criticism ==
Although very popular in their day, Bridge's books are mostly out of print and have received little critical attention, generally being regarded as "entertaining travelogues." She explored "serious human relationships" in exotic locales and described personal, historical, and political developments with skill and veracity. Her protagonists have been described as "snooty."

== List of works ==
Novels

- Peking Picnic (1932)
- The Ginger Griffin (1934)
- Illyrian Spring (1935)
- The Song in the House: Stories (1936)
- Enchanter's Nightshade (1937)
- Four-Part Setting (1938)
- A Place to Stand (1940)
- Frontier Passage (1942)
- Singing Waters (1943)
- And Then You Came (1948)
- The House At Kilmartin (1951)
- The Dark Moment (1951)
- A Place to Stand (1953)
- The Tightening String (1962)
- Permission to Resign (1971)

Julia Probyn mystery series

- The Lighthearted Quest (1956)
- The Portuguese Escape (1958)
- The Numbered Account (1960)
- The Dangerous Islands (1963)
- Emergency in the Pyrenees (1965)
- The Episode at Toledo (1966)
- The Malady in Madeira (1970)
- Julia in Ireland (1973)

Non fiction

- The Selective Traveller in Portugal (with Susan Lowndes)(1949)
- Portrait of My Mother (1955)
- Facts and Fictions: Some Literary Recollections (1968)
- Moments of Knowing (1970)
