= Arthur Hugh McShine =

Chief Justice of Trinidad and Tobago from 1969 to 1970

Sir Arthur Hugh McShine (11 May 1906 – 10 July 1983) was the Chief Justice of Trinidad and Tobago from 1969 until 1970. He was earlier the acting Chief Judge of Trinidad and Tobago in 1961 till Trinidad and Tobago became independent in 1962. He was born on 11 May 1906, the son Arthur Hutton McShine, Trinidad and Tobago's first qualified ophthalmologist. He died on 10 July 1983, aged 77.
