= John Charles Bucknill =

English psychiatrist (1817–1897)

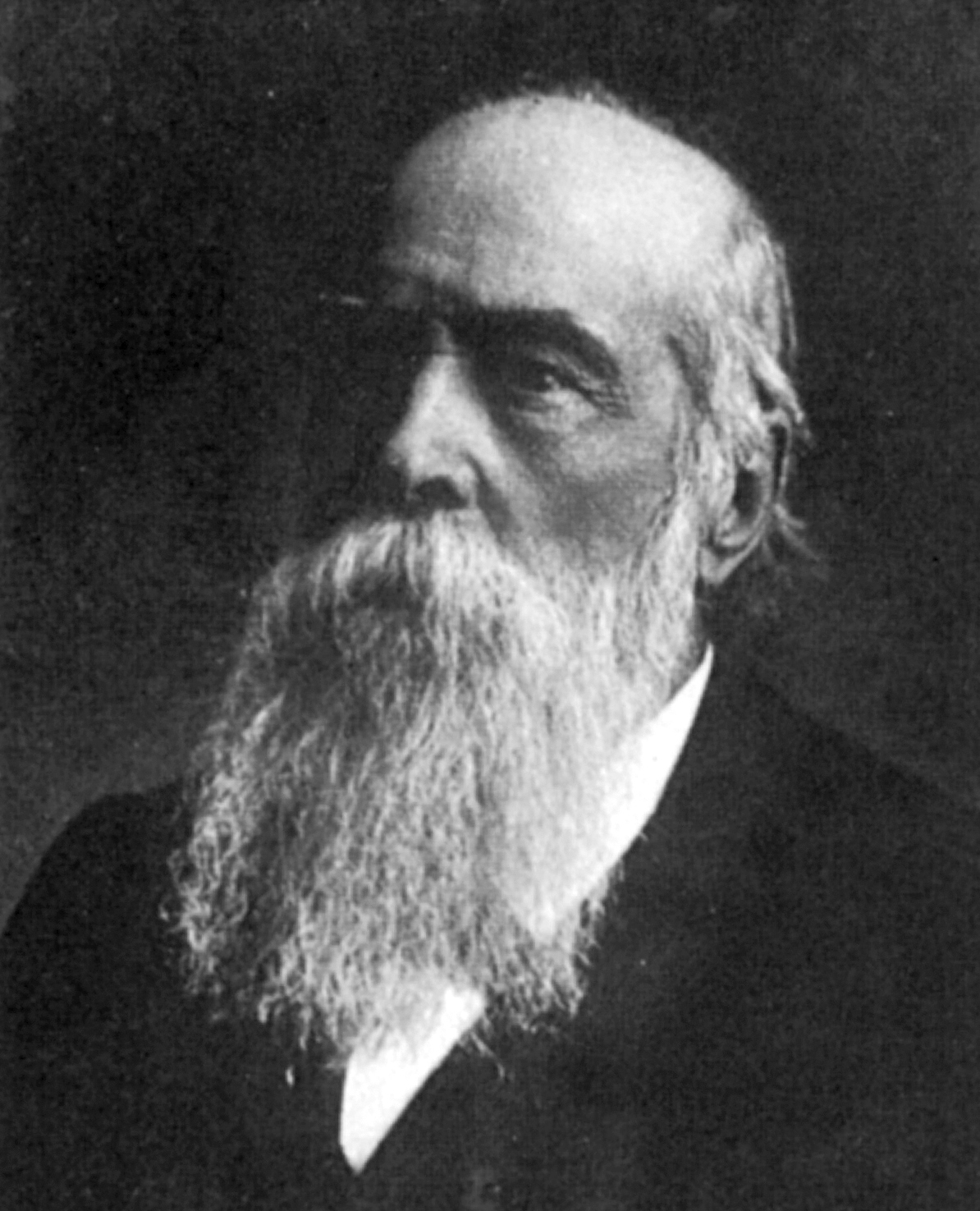
John Charles Bucknill

Sir John Charles Bucknill FRS (25 December 1817 – 19 July 1897) was an English psychiatrist and mental health reformer. He was the father of judge Sir Thomas Townsend Bucknill QC MP.

== Biography ==
Bucknill was born in Market Bosworth, Leicestershire, and educated at Rugby School and at University College, London. He served as an assistant to his father, a surgeon, and began formal medical training in Dublin, transferring after a year to the University of London.

Bucknill believed that insanity was a brain disease that could be treated with medication. He became acquainted with Dr. John Conolly's work at the Hanwell Asylum in Middlesex where no restraints were used to control agitated patients. Bucknill became an ardent supporter of this procedure. He had a special interest in the Lunacy laws and the protection of the civil rights of patients.

He qualified as a doctor in 1840, obtained a Licentiate in the Society of Apothecaries and membership in the Royal College of Surgeons. He worked as a surgeon's dresser at University College Hospital and began private practice in Chelsea. From 1844 to 1862 he was medical superintendent at Devon County Asylum.

In 1875, Bucknill travelled to North America. He visited ten asylums in the United States and three in Canada, reporting his findings in a book titled Notes on Asylums for the Insane in America. He praised the private Pennsylvania Hospital in Philadelphia, McLean in Boston, and Bloomingdale in New York, but was sharply critical of the public asylum, Blockley in Philadelphia and the New York City asylums on Ward's and Blackwell's Islands. He approved of the National Hospital for the Insane in Washington (now St. Elizabeth's). He also met Dorothea Dix in Washington and saw her again when she visited England.

During his American visit he was invited to attend the annual meeting of the Association of Medical Superintendents of American Institutions for the Insane (forerunner of the American Psychiatric Association) held in Nashville in 1875. He and the Superintendents disagreed about the practice of non-restraint for agitated patients. The Superintendents were unanimous in the opinion that they could not manage the hospitals without restraints. Bucknill offered a wager of 100 pounds if anyone would visit public British asylums and find restraint in use. There were no takers. The Association elected him their first honorary member.

In 1853 he founded the Journal of Mental Science, which he edited until 1862, and was co-founder of the journal Brain. He was elected fellow of the Royal College of Physicians in 1859 and gave their annual Lumleian Lectures in 1878. He was knighted in 1894.

Eventually, he retired from London to Bournemouth and lived the life of a country gentleman. He died in 1897.

== Publications ==
- Bucknill, J.C. (1857), Unsoundness of mind in relation to criminal acts. An essay to which the first Sugden prize was awarded by the King & Queen's college of physicians in Ireland, London: Longman, Brown, Green, Longmans & Roberts
- Bucknill, J.C.; Tuke, D.H. (1858), Manual of psychological medicine: containing history, nosology, description, statistics, diagnosis, pathology, and treatment of insanity, with an appendix of cases, London: Churchill
- Bucknill, J.C. (1859), Psychology of Shakespeare, London: Longman, Brown, Green, Longmans & Roberts
- Bucknill, J.C. (1860), The Medical Knowledge of Shakespeare
- Bucknill, J.C. (1867), The Mad Folk of Shakespeare. Psychological essays, London and Cambridge: Macmillan and Co.
- Bucknill, J.C. (1876), Notes on Asylums for the Insane in America, London: Churchill
- Bucknill, J.C.; Clouston (1876), On asylums for drunkards, and the relations of drink and insanity, Lewes: Geo. P. Bacon, Steam Printing Office
- Bucknill, J.C. (1878), Habitual drunkenness and insane drunkards, London: Macmillan and Co.
- Bucknill, J.C. (1880), Care of the Insane and their Legal Control
