= Governor Blood =

Governor Blood may refer to:

- Henry H. Blood (1872–1942), 7th Governor of Utah
- Hilary Blood (1893–1967), Governor of the Gambia from 1942 to 1947, Governor of Barbados from 1947 to 1949, and Governor of Mauritius from 1949 to 1954
- Robert O. Blood (1887–1975), 65th Governor of New Hampshire
