= Mark Aitchison Young =

British administrator

Sir Mark Young GCMG KStJ
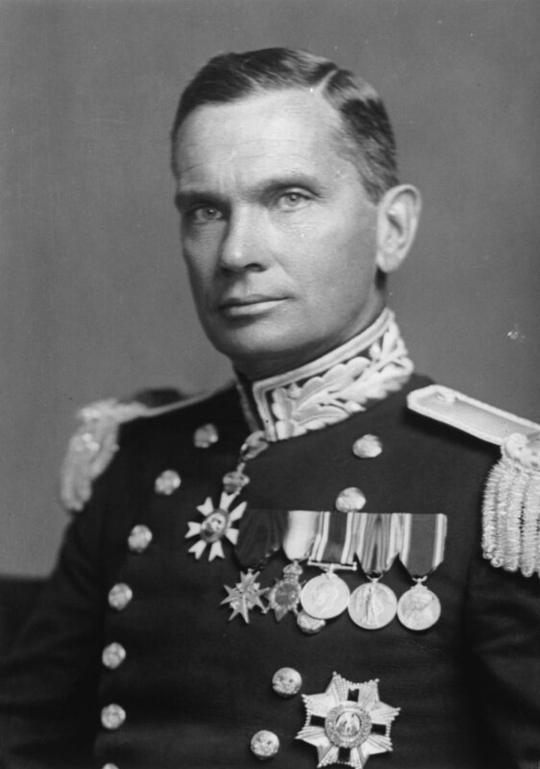
- Portrait, early 1930s

21st Governor of Hong Kong
- In office 1 May 1946 – 17 May 1947
- Monarch: George VI
- Colonial Secretary: David Mercer MacDougall
- Preceded by: Sir Cecil Harcourt (Acting, Military Administration)
- Succeeded by: Alexander Grantham
- In office 10 September 1941 – 25 December 1941
- Monarch: George VI
- Colonial Secretary: Norman Lockhart Smith; Sir Franklin Gimson
- Preceded by: Sir Geoffry Northcote
- Succeeded by: Takashi Sakai (under Japanese occupation)

Governor of Tanganyika
- In office 8 July 1938 – 19 June 1941
- Monarch: George VI
- Preceded by: Sir Harold Alfred MacMichael
- Succeeded by: Sir Wilfrid Jackson

Personal details
- Born: 30 June 1886 British Raj
- Died: 12 May 1974 (aged 87) Winchester, England, United Kingdom
- Spouse: Josephine Mary
- Education: King's College, Cambridge
- Profession: soldier, colonial colonial administrator

Chinese name
- Traditional Chinese: 楊慕琦
- Simplified Chinese: 杨慕琦
Transcriptions
Standard Mandarin
- Hanyu Pinyin: Yáng Mùqí
Yue: Cantonese
- Jyutping: joeng4 mou6 kei4

Sir Mark Aitchison Young GCMG KStJ (Chinese: 楊慕琦; 30 June 1886 – 12 May 1974) was a British colonial administrator, who is best remembered for his service as the Governor of Hong Kong at the time of the Japanese invasion of the territory in 1941.

Born in British India, the son and grandson of senior members of the Indian Civil Service, Young followed in the steps of his two elder brothers and became a colonial administrator, serving in Ceylon, Sierra Leone, Palestine, before becoming governor of Barbados and of Tanganyika. Young assumed the governorship of Hong Kong in 1941, three months before the outbreak of the Pacific War. During the Battle of Hong Kong, Young refused to capitulate on numerous occasions, before surrendering on Christmas Day, 1941 in order to avoid further bloodshed. Young then became a Japanese prisoner-of-war until 1945.

After a period of recovery, Young returned to Hong Kong in 1946 as its governor, Young introduced limited democratic reforms in Hong Kong, which were undone by his successor, Sir Alexander Grantham. Retiring to England, Young died in Winchester in 1974.

== Early life and education ==
Young was the third son of colonial administrator Sir William Mackworth Young, sometime Lieutenant-Governor of the Punjab, and his second wife, Frances Mary, daughter of Sir Robert Eyles Egerton, also Lieutenant-Governor of the Punjab. Sir Robert Egerton was nephew of Sir John Grey Egerton, 8th Baronet and the Reverend Sir Philip Grey Egerton, 9th Baronet.

Young was educated at Eton College and King's College, Cambridge, where he took first-class honours in Classics.

== Colonial career ==
He entered the Eastern Cadet Service and went to Ceylon in 1909. He served in the British Army with the Rifle Brigade (Prince Consort's Own) during World War I from 1915.

Young served as principal assistant colonial secretary of Ceylon (from 1923 to 1925 under Sir Cecil Clementi and Murchison Fletcher from 1925 to 1928), then as colonial secretary of Sierra Leone from 1928 to 1930. From 1930 to 1933, he served as chief secretary to the Government of the British Mandate of Palestine.

From 5 August 1933 to March 1938, he served as governor and commander-in-chief of Barbados. From November 1937 to February 1938, he served in the Government of Trinidad and Tobago.

From 1938 to 1941, Young served as Governor and Commander-in-Chief of Tanganyika. With the war in Europe looming, Young restored confidence within the colony, which was apprehensive that it would be returned to Germany as part of peace negotiations. He also took the step of appointing Indian representatives to the territory's institutions. At the outbreak of the Second World War, Young swiftly disarmed and interned the colony's large German population.

== Hong Kong governor, prisoner of war ==
On 10 September 1941 Young was appointed Governor of Hong Kong. Japanese forces already occupied parts of mainland China adjoining Hong Kong as part of their ongoing war with China, and early in Young's term Hong Kong came under the threat of Japanese invasion.

At 08:00, 8 December 1941, several hours after Pearl Harbor was attacked, Hong Kong came under fire by Imperial Japanese Forces. The battle lasted for 17 days, and ended when Young surrendered the colony to the Japanese General Takashi Sakai on 25 December, known as the 'Black Christmas' by Hong Kong people, who were then subject to Japanese rule for the next 3 years and 8 months. Young rebuffed several attempts by General Maltby and others in the military to ask for terms and discuss surrender as early as the 18th. This was in part based on clear instruction by Churchill directly to Young, advising him that "Every Part of (Hong Kong) Island must be fought over and the enemy resisted with the utmost stubbornness. Every day that you are able to maintain your resistance you help the Allied cause all over the world."

Young was a prisoner of war in Japanese hands from December 1941 to August 1945. He was initially held in the Peninsula Hotel and subsequently incarcerated in a prisoner of war camp in Stanley, on the southern shores of Hong Kong Island. Shortly thereafter, he was later transferred, with other high-ranking Allied captives, including General Maltby, to a series of POW camps in Shanghai, Taiwan, and Japan, then to a camp near the Chinese-Mongolian border, and finally to a location near Mukden (modern Shenyang) Manchuria, until his liberation at war's end. Despite being the colony's highest-ranking official, Young was mistreated by his captors. Japan was defeated and surrendered in September 1945 and the British regained control of the colony.

== Post-Japanese occupation governorship ==
Young resumed his duties as Governor of Hong Kong on 1 May 1946, after having spent some time recuperating in England. After returning, he proposed political reforms that would have allowed Hong Kong residents to directly choose a 30-member representative Legislative Council. He envisaged that the new Council would handle everyday affairs and that its decisions would be immune to the Governor's veto. Young, echoing the plan of Sir Geoffry Northcote, called for the promotion of local Chinese civil servants to the senior posts. These initiatives were eventually abandoned under the term of Governor Sir Alexander Grantham, an ardent conservative. Young retired from the governorship in 1947.

== Personal life ==
Young and his wife, Josephine Mary, had four children, including Sir Brian Young.

Young, Sir William Robinson and Christopher Patten are the only governors not to have been honoured in Hong Kong after completing their post. This is probably because most of Young's time in Hong Kong was spent as prisoner of war, with only a brief period from 1946 to 1947 as governor.

His brothers Gerard Mackworth Young (also director of the British School at Athens) and Sir Hubert Winthrop Young, KCMG, were also colonial administrators.

== Honours ==
- Companion of the Order of St Michael and St George (C.M.G.) (1931)
- Knight Commander of the Order of St Michael and St George (K.C.M.G.) – Sir (1934)
- Knight Grand Cross of the Order of St Michael and St George (G.C.M.G.) – Sir (1946)

Government offices
Preceded by Sir John Robert Chancellor	High Commissioner of Palestine; High Commissioner for Trans-Jordan; 1931–1932 (acting)	Succeeded by Sir Arthur Grenfell Wauchope
Preceded by Harry Scott Newlands	Governor of Barbados; 1933–1938	Succeeded by Sir Eubule John Waddington
Preceded by Harold Alfred MacMichael	Governor of Tanganyika Territory; 1938–1941	Succeeded by Wilfrid Edward Francis Jackson
Preceded by Sir Geoffry Northcote	Governor of Hong Kong; 1941	Succeeded by Takashi Sakai and Masaichi Niimi as Governor-General of Hong Kong; Japanese occupation of Hong Kong
Preceded by Admiral Sir Cecil Harcourt as Administrator of Hong Kong	Governor of Hong Kong; 1946–1947	Succeeded by Sir Alexander Grantham
