= Andrew Caldecott =

Colonial Administrator

Sir Andrew Caldecott GCMG CBE KStJ FRAS FRSA
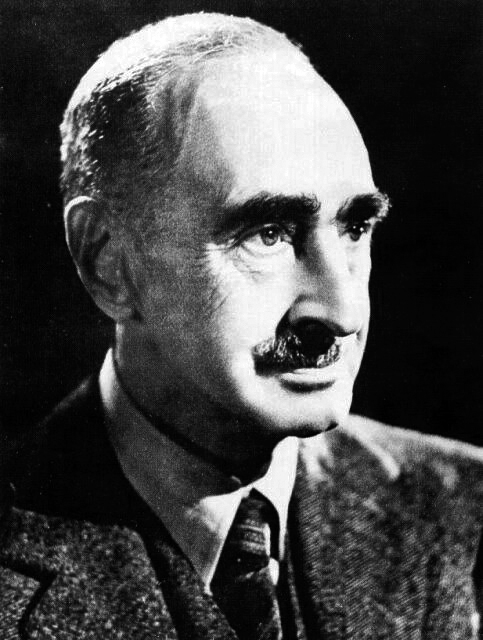

28th Governor of Ceylon
- In office 16 October 1937 – 19 September 1944
- Monarch: George VI
- Preceded by: Reginald Stubbs
- Succeeded by: Henry Moore

19th Governor of Hong Kong
- In office 12 December 1935 – 16 April 1937
- Monarchs: George V; Edward VIII; George VI
- Colonial Secretary: Thomas Southorn; Norman Lockhart Smith
- Preceded by: William Peel
- Succeeded by: Geoffry Northcote

Acting Governor of the Straits Settlements
- In office 17 February 1934 – 9 November 1934
- Monarch: George V
- Preceded by: Cecil Clementi
- Succeeded by: Shenton Thomas

17th Colonial Secretary of the Straits Settlements
- In office 23 May 1933 – 7 December 1935
- Monarch: George V
- Governor: Cecil Clementi; Shenton Thomas
- Preceded by: John Scott
- Succeeded by: Alexander Sym Small

Personal details
- Born: 26 October 1884 Boxley, Kent, United Kingdom
- Died: 14 July 1951 (aged 66) Itchenor, Sussex, United Kingdom
- Spouses: Olive Mary Innes (m. 1918; died 1943) Evelyn May Palmer (m. 1946–1951)
- Children: John Andrew; Joan
- Parents: Rev Andrew Caldecott (father); Isobel Mary Johnson (mother)
- Education: Exeter College, Oxford

Chinese name
- Traditional Chinese: 郝德傑
- Simplified Chinese: 郝德杰
Transcriptions
Yue: Cantonese
- Yale Romanization: Gok Dāk giht
- Jyutping: Gok^{3} Dak^{1} git^{6}

Sir Andrew Caldecott GCMG CBE KStJ FRAS FRSA (26 October 1884 – 14 July 1951) was a British colonial administrator.

== Early years ==
Andrew Caldecott was born on 26 October 1884 in Boxley, Kent, United Kingdom. He was the eldest child of Rev Andrew Caldecott and Isobel Mary Johnson. His mother was the daughter of Rev Stenning Johnson. Lieutenant John Leslie Caldecott (1886 – 9 September 1914), Andrew's younger brother, served in the Royal Garrison Artillery and later served as the aide-de-camp to the Governor of Nyasaland. John participated in World War I and died on 9 September 1914 in Nyasaland (now Malawi) at the age of 28, with his remains buried at the Karonga War Cemetery.

== Education ==
Andrew Caldecott studied at Uppingham School in Rutland and was awarded scholarships, enabling him to be admitted to Exeter College of the University of Oxford. He achieved outstanding academic results while in college and had been awarded scholarships. He gained a third class in Classical Honour Moderations and subsequently graduated with a Bachelor of Arts in Classics (second-class honours) in 1907. In 1948, he was conferred as an Honorary Fellow by Exeter College.

== Career ==
=== Malayan career ===
Upon his graduation from college in 1907, Caldecott joined the Colonial Office in November of the same year and was posted to Malaya. He initially worked in Negeri Sembilan as a Cadet of the Federated Malay States (FMS). He served as Acting District Officer (DO) of Jelebu from 1909 to 1911. In 1911, he was appointed as Acting DO of Kuala Pilah, and was transferred back to Jelebu to serve as DO in the same year. He was re-appointed Acting DO of Kuala Pilah in the following year. In 1913, Caldecott was transferred to the Federal Secretariat in Kuala Lumpur and assumed the office of Deputy Controller of Labour. He subsequently held various positions, including Assistant Secretary (AS) to the Chief Secretary (1914 – 1916), 2nd AS to the Federal Secretary (1916 – 1920) and Acting AS to the colonial government (1920 – 1922). Caldecott went on leave from September 1922; he took up the ad hoc appointment as Malayan Commissioner at the British Empire Exhibition held at Wembley Park in the United Kingdom in 1924 and 1925. During the exhibition, he was in charge of the coordination of the Malaya Pavilion. Thereafter, he was conferred CBE by the British government.

After the exhibition, Caldecott returned to Malaya in March 1926 and worked as Town Planning Administrator and State Valuer of Ipoh; he was transferred to the Housing and Public Works Department Enquiry Committees as chairman in December 1926.

He was appointed Deputy Controller of Labour and Acting Under-Secretary to the Straits Settlements in July 1927, until 1928, when he was promoted to Secretary for Postal Affairs of the Straits Settlements and FMS as Officer, Class 1A. Since then, Caldecott had been assigned to serve in local authorities; he became Acting Resident of Negeri Sembilan in 1929 and Acting Resident of Perak from 1930 to 1931. He was appointed to serve as Resident of Selangor, until March 1932, when he was transferred back to the central government of FMS as Chief Secretary. He served as Colonial Secretary of the Straits Settlements from May 1933 to February 1934.

On 17 February 1934, Caldecott worked as Acting Governor of the Straits Settlements and High Commissioner of FMS, when Sir Cecil Clementi, the then-Governor of the Straits Settlements retired due to illness. During his tenure as Acting Governor, Caldecott upheld Clementi's policy of decentralisation. He was re-appointed Colonial Secretary when Sir Shenton Thomas took office on 9 November 1934.

During his time in Malaya, Caldecott earned a reputation for his ability to settle disputes between different ethnic groups which made him popular with all races, a rare feat for a colonial administrator given the diversity of the Straits Settlements population. He also served as the first president of the Football Association of Malaysia.

=== Governor of Hong Kong ===
In 1935, Caldecott was appointed governor of Hong Kong. His tenure was the shortest in Hong Kong colonial history, for he was appointed the second last Governor of Ceylon a little more than a year later to handle the threat to the British administration caused by the overwhelming national liberation movement in Ceylon. When arriving in Hong Kong to assume the Governorship, Caldecott, unusually, elected to wear civilian dress, something that would not happen again until the arrival, in 1992, of the last colonial Governor, Chris Patten. His departure to Ceylon was met with dismay by the community as he had become a respected figure. Locals had petitioned to Foreign Secretary Anthony Eden for him to remain but to no avail.

It was during Caldecott's tenure that Hong Kong's Kai Tak Airport received its first regular arrival, the "Dorado" and the Queen Mary Hospital opened as an adjunct hospital to the Hong Kong University (the hospital is now under the control of the Hong Kong Hospital Authority). Caldecott called the promotion of Chinese civil servants to replace the European ones, a policy not realized until the signage of Sino-British Joint Declaration in 1984. His tenure also saw the outbreak of the Second Sino-Japanese War, with more than 100,000 refugees from mainland China flooding into Hong Kong to escape the conflict.

=== Governor of Ceylon ===
He was sent to Ceylon (Sri Lanka) to examine the situation in the island closely and report on issues such as the governing structure, the representation of the minority communities, the franchise etc. His observations regarding these issues had an important impact on the evolution of the Ceylon constitution.

Caldecott was governor during World War II. During his governance, in 1938, the first diesel locomotive ran to Galle, in 1939, the Bank of Ceylon opened, and, in 1942, the University of Ceylon was established.

== Personal life ==
Caldecott married Olive Mary Innes, daughter of J. R. Innes, CMG in 1918. He knew his wife while she served as a civil servant in Malaya. She died of illness in Ceylon in 1943. Following her death, Caldecott married Evelyn May Palmer (1877–1974), widow of Dr John Robertson and daughter of the Rev. Henry Palmer and Clara Jane Marten, in 1946. Olive bore him a son and a daughter, namely John Andrew Caldecott, CBE (25 February 1924 – 14 July 1990) and Joan Caldecott. His son was Chairman of M&G Group.

Caldecott had a wide range of hobbies. He had published many articles with regards to the affairs of Malaya, and had written books about Malayan history in his early years. In his late years, he published two collections of supernatural fiction, "Not Exactly Ghosts" (1947) and "Fires Burn Blue" (1948). Besides writing, his other hobbies include drawing, playing the piano, tennis and golf.

Caldecott composed the melody to the Negeri Sembilan anthem, Berkatlah Yang DiPertuan Besar Negeri Sembilan.

== Works ==
- History of Jelebu, 1912.
- Not Exactly Ghosts, 1947.
- Fires Burn Blue, 1948.

== Awards and honours ==
- C.B.E., 1926
- C.M.G., 1932
- K.B.E., 1935
- K.St.J., 1936
- K.C.M.G., 1937
- G.C.M.G., 1941
- Awarded M.A. in Oxon
- Awarded LL.D. in Ceylon
- Malayan Commissioner, British Empire Exhibition, 1924–5
- Member, Royal Asiatic Society (M.R.A.S.)
- Fellow, Royal Society of Arts (F.R.S.A.)
- Honorary Fellow, Royal Philharmonic Society, 1947

== Places named after Andrew Caldecott ==
In Hong Kong, Caldecott Road, a road in New Kowloon, is named after him.

In Singapore, Caldecott Hill, Caldecott Close, Caldecott MRT station and Andrew Road are named after him, and Olive Road is named after his first wife.

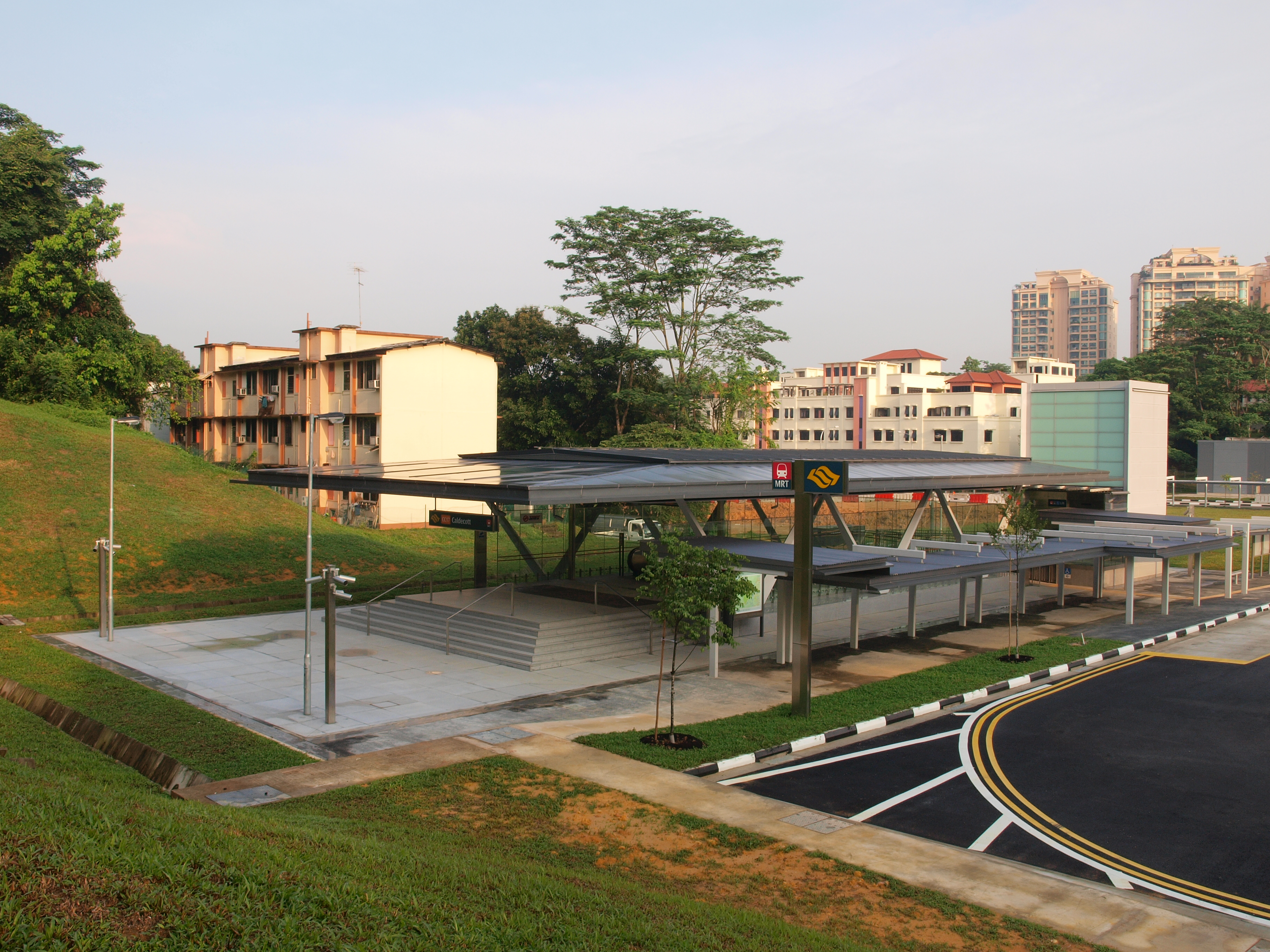
Caldecott MRT station in Singapore, named after Andrew Caldecott

== See also ==
- History of Malaysia
- History of Singapore
- History of Hong Kong
- History of Sri Lanka

Government offices
Preceded by Sir Reginald Stubbs	Governor of Ceylon; 1937–1944	Succeeded by Sir Henry Moore
Preceded by Sir William Peel	Governor of Hong Kong; 1935–1937	Succeeded by Sir Geoffry Northcote
Preceded by Sir Cecil Clementi as Governor	Acting Governor of the Straits Settlements; 1934	Succeeded by Sir Shenton Thomas as Governor
Preceded by Sir John Scott	Colonial Secretary of Straits Settlements; 1933–1935	Succeeded by Sir Alexander Sym Small
