= Chief Secretary for Administration =

Principal official of Hong Kong

- 政務司司長
- Emblem of Hong Kong

- Flag of Hong Kong

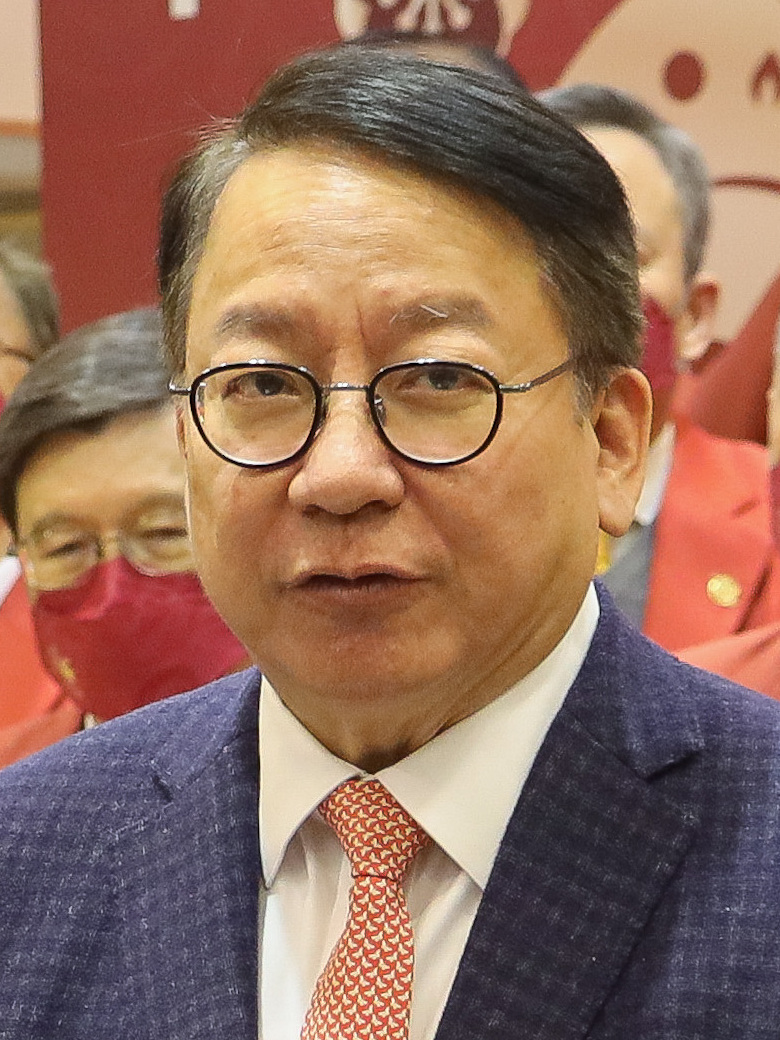
- Incumbent; Eric Chan since 1 July 2022
- Government Secretariat of Hong Kong; Government of Hong Kong
- Style: Chief Secretary (司長) (informal); The Honourable (尊貴的) (formal)
- Member of: Government Secretariat; Executive Council
- Reports to: Legislative Council
- Residence: Victoria House, 15 Barker Road, Victoria Peak
- Nominator: Chief Executive
- Appointer: State Council of the People's Republic of China
- Term length: No longer than the Chief Executive's remaining term
- Constituting instrument: Hong Kong Basic Law
- Inaugural holder: Anson Chan
- Formation: 1 July 1997; 29 years ago
- Salary: HK$4,500,000 annually
- Website: cso.gov.hk

Chief Secretary for Administration
- Traditional Chinese: 政務司司長
- Simplified Chinese: 政务司司长
- Cantonese Yale: Jingmouhsī Sījéung
Transcriptions
Standard Mandarin
- Hanyu Pinyin: Zhèngwùsī Sīzhǎng
Yue: Cantonese
- Yale Romanization: Jingmouhsī Sījéung
- Jyutping: Zing3mou6si1 Si1zoeng2
- IPA: [tsēːŋ.mòu.síː síː.tsœ̌ːŋ]

The chief secretary for administration is the second-highest government official in Hong Kong, right after the Chief Executive of Hong Kong. When the chief executive is on leave, the chief secretary for administration will act on their behalf.

The chief secretary for administration heads the Government Secretariat, which oversees the administration of the Region to which all other ministers belong. The chief secretary for administration reports to the chief executive and to the Legislative Council. Under Article 53 of the Basic Law, the position is constitutionally known as "Administrative Secretary".

The chief secretary formulates and implements government policy, gives advice to the Chief Executive as a member of the Executive Council, and is responsible for managing the Government's relationship with the Legislative Council and drawing up the Government's legislative programme. The office (“Department of Administration” per Article 60 of the Basic Law) also exercises certain statutory functions, such as the handling of appeals from designated public bodies.

Prior to the transfer of sovereignty over Hong Kong in 1997, the office was known simply as "Chief Secretary" (布政司; bou3 zing3 si1), and before 27 August 1976, "Colonial Secretary" (輔政司; fu6 zing3 si1). Until the introduction of the Principal Officials Accountability System in 2002, the Chief Secretary was a civil service position, and in this capacity, the head of the public service. In 2005, Henry Tang became the first person who has not been a civil servant to be appointed to the office of the chief secretary.

From the 1870s to 1902 the colonial secretary was the de facto lieutenant governor of Hong Kong which was once held by the commander of British Forces in Hong Kong before 1870s when the post was not lapsed from power. After 1902 the title disappeared from use as the second highest post was transferred to the colonial secretary and later, chief secretary.

== List of chief secretaries of Hong Kong ==
=== Colonial secretaries, 1843–1941 ===
No.	Portrait	Name	Term of office		Governor	Ref
1		George Alexander Malcolm 麻恭	26 June 1843	29 August 1843	Sir Henry Pottinger (1843–1844)	
2		Sir Frederick Wright-Bruce 卜魯斯	9 February 1844	1846	Sir Henry Pottinger (1843–1844)	
2		Sir Frederick Wright-Bruce 卜魯斯	9 February 1844	1846	Sir John Francis Davis (1843–1848)	
3		William Caine 威廉·堅	3 September 1846	12 April 1854	Sir John Francis Davis (1843–1848)	
3		William Caine 威廉·堅	3 September 1846	12 April 1854	Sir George Bonham (1848–1854)	
4		William Thomas Mercer 孖沙	13 April 1854	14 May 1867	Sir John Bowring (1854–1859)	
4		William Thomas Mercer 孖沙	13 April 1854	14 May 1867	Sir Hercules Robinson (1859–1865)	
4		William Thomas Mercer 孖沙	13 April 1854	14 May 1867	Sir Richard MacDonnell (1866–1872)	
5		John Gardiner Austin 柯士甸	7 May 1868	4 April 1878	Sir Richard MacDonnell (1866–1872)	
5		John Gardiner Austin 柯士甸	7 May 1868	4 April 1878	Sir Arthur Kennedy (1872–1877)	
5		John Gardiner Austin 柯士甸	7 May 1868	4 April 1878	Sir John Pope Hennessy (1877–1882)	
6		William Henry Marsh 馬師	3 January 1879	10 June 1887	Sir John Pope Hennessy (1877–1882)	
6		William Henry Marsh 馬師	3 January 1879	10 June 1887	Sir George Bowen (1883–1887)	
7		Frederick Stewart 史釗域	5 October 1887	6 October 1889	Sir William Des Voeux (1887–1891)	
8		Francis Fleming 菲林明	17 January 1890	26 February 1892	Sir William Des Voeux (1887–1891)	
8		Francis Fleming 菲林明	17 January 1890	26 February 1892	Sir William Robinson (1891–1898)	
9		G. T. M. O'Brien 柯布連	11 March 1892	30 April 1894	Sir William Robinson (1891–1898)	
10		Sir Stewart Lockhart 駱克	26 March 1895	23 April 1902	Sir William Robinson (1891–1898)	
10		Sir Stewart Lockhart 駱克	26 March 1895	23 April 1902	Sir Henry Arthur Blake (1898–1903)	
11		Sir Francis Henry May 梅含理	14 May 1902	30 April 1911	Sir Henry Arthur Blake (1898–1903)	
11		Sir Francis Henry May 梅含理	14 May 1902	30 April 1911	Sir Matthew Nathan (1904–1907)	
11		Sir Francis Henry May 梅含理	14 May 1902	30 April 1911	Sir Frederick Lugard (1907–1912)	
12		Warren Delabere Barnes 班士	7 June 1911	28 October 1911	Sir Frederick Lugard (1907–1912)	
13		Sir Claud Severn 施勳	22 February 1912	14 November 1925	Sir Frederick Lugard (1907–1912)	
13		Sir Claud Severn 施勳	22 February 1912	14 November 1925	Sir Francis Henry May (1912–1918)	
13		Sir Claud Severn 施勳	22 February 1912	14 November 1925	Sir Reginald Stubbs (1919–1925)	
14		Sir Thomas Southorn 修頓	1 May 1926	23 March 1936	Sir Cecil Clementi (1925–1930)	
14		Sir Thomas Southorn 修頓	1 May 1926	23 March 1936	Sir William Peel (1930–1935)	
14		Sir Thomas Southorn 修頓	1 May 1926	23 March 1936	Sir Andrew Caldecott (1935–1937)	
15		Norman Lockhart Smith 史美	26 November 1936	8 December 1941	Sir Andrew Caldecott (1935–1937)	
15		Norman Lockhart Smith 史美	26 November 1936	8 December 1941	Sir Geoffry Northcote (1937–1941)	
15		Norman Lockhart Smith 史美	26 November 1936	8 December 1941	Sir Mark Aitchison Young (1941)	
16		Sir Franklin Gimson 詹遜	8 December 1941	25 December 1941	Sir Mark Aitchison Young (1941)	

=== Colonial secretaries, 1946–1976 ===
No.	Portrait	Name	Term of office		Duration	Governor	Ref
17		David Mercer MacDougall 麥道高	1 May 1946	11 May 1949	2 years, 344 days	Sir Mark Aitchison Young (1946–1947)	
17		David Mercer MacDougall 麥道高	1 May 1946	11 May 1949	2 years, 344 days	Sir Alexander Grantham (1947–1957)	
18		John Fearns Nicoll 列誥	25 May 1949	23 January 1952	2 years, 243 days	Sir Alexander Grantham (1947–1957)	
19		Sir Robert Brown Black 柏立基	20 February 1952	30 March 1955	3 years, 38 days	Sir Alexander Grantham (1947–1957)	
20		Edgeworth Beresford David 戴維德	4 May 1955	24 January 1958	2 years, 265 days	Sir Alexander Grantham (1947–1957)	
20		Edgeworth Beresford David 戴維德	4 May 1955	24 January 1958	2 years, 265 days	Sir Robert Brown Black (1958–1964)	
21		Claude Bramall Burgess 白嘉時	24 January 1958	10 March 1963	5 years, 46 days	Sir Robert Brown Black (1958–1964)	
22		Edmund Brinsley Teesdale 戴斯德	11 March 1963	28 March 1965	2 years, 18 days	Sir Robert Brown Black (1958–1964)	
22		Edmund Brinsley Teesdale 戴斯德	11 March 1963	28 March 1965	2 years, 18 days	Sir David Trench (1964–1971)	
23		Sir Michael Gass 祈濟時	4 September 1965	22 January 1969	3 years, 141 days	Sir David Trench (1964–1971)	
24		Sir Hugh Norman-Walker 羅樂民	29 March 1969	29 September 1973	4 years, 185 days	Sir David Trench (1964–1971)	
24		Sir Hugh Norman-Walker 羅樂民	29 March 1969	29 September 1973	4 years, 185 days	Sir Murray MacLehose (1971–1982)	
25		Sir Denys Roberts 羅弼時	30 September 1973	26 August 1976	2 years, 332 days	Sir Murray MacLehose (1971–1982)	

=== Chief secretaries, 1976–1997 ===
No.	Portrait	Name	Term of office		Duration	Governor	Ref
1		Sir Denys Roberts 羅弼時	27 August 1976	2 October 1978	2 years, 37 days	Sir Murray MacLehose (1971–1982)	
2		Sir Jack Cater 姬達	3 October 1978	19 November 1981	3 years, 48 days	Sir Murray MacLehose (1971–1982)	
3		Sir Philip Haddon-Cave 夏鼎基	20 November 1981	9 June 1985	3 years, 202 days	Sir Murray MacLehose (1971–1982)	
3		Sir Philip Haddon-Cave 夏鼎基	20 November 1981	9 June 1985	3 years, 202 days	Sir Edward Youde (1982–1986)	
4		Sir David Akers-Jones 鍾逸傑	10 June 1985	11 February 1987	1 year, 247 days	Sir Edward Youde (1982–1986)	
5		Sir David Robert Ford 霍德	12 February 1987	28 November 1993	6 years, 290 days	Sir David Wilson (1987–1992)	
5		Sir David Robert Ford 霍德	12 February 1987	28 November 1993	6 years, 290 days	Chris Patten (1992–1997)	
6		Anson Chan 陳方安生	29 November 1993	30 June 1997	3 years, 214 days	Chris Patten (1992–1997)	

=== Chief secretaries for administration, 1997–present ===
Political party: Nonpartisan

No.	Portrait	Name	Term of office		Duration	Chief Executive	Term	Ref
1		Anson Chan 陳方安生	1 July 1997	30 April 2001	3 years, 304 days	Tung Chee-hwa (1997–2005)	1	
2		Sir Donald Tsang 曾蔭權	1 May 2001	31 May 2005 (Note: Resigned on 25 May 2005, with effect from 1 June 2005, Michael Suen served as acting Chief Secretary between 25 May and 30 June 2005.)	4 years, 31 days	Tung Chee-hwa (1997–2005)	1	
2		Sir Donald Tsang 曾蔭權	1 May 2001	31 May 2005	4 years, 31 days	Tung Chee-hwa (1997–2005)	2	
3		Rafael Hui Si-yan 許仕仁	30 June 2005	30 June 2007	2 years, 0 days	Donald Tsang (2005–2012)	2	
4		Henry Tang Ying-yen 唐英年	1 July 2007	30 September 2011 (Note: Resigned on 28 September 2011, with effect from 30 September 2011, Michael Suen served as acting Chief Secretary between 28 and 30 September 2011.)	4 years, 91 days	Donald Tsang (2005–2012)	3	
5		Stephen Lam Sui-lung 林瑞麟	30 September 2011	30 June 2012	275 days	Donald Tsang (2005–2012)	3	
6		Carrie Lam Cheng Yuet-ngor 林鄭月娥	1 July 2012	16 January 2017 (Note: Resigned on 12 January 2017, with effect from 16 January 2017, Matthew Cheung served as acting Chief Secretary from 13 to 16 January 2017.)	4 years, 200 days	Leung Chun-ying (2012–2017)	4	
7		Matthew Cheung Kin-chung 張建宗	16 January 2017	25 June 2021	4 years, 161 days	Leung Chun-ying (2012–2017)	4	
7		Matthew Cheung Kin-chung 張建宗	16 January 2017	25 June 2021	4 years, 161 days	Carrie Lam (2017–2022)	5	
8		John Lee Ka-chiu 李家超	25 June 2021	7 April 2022 (Note: Resigned on 6 April 2022, with effect from 7 April 2022; Position vacant until 1 July 2022.)	287 days	Carrie Lam (2017–2022)	5	
9		Eric Chan Kwok-ki 陳國基	1 July 2022	Incumbent	4 years, 143 days	John Lee (2022–present)	6	

== Residence ==
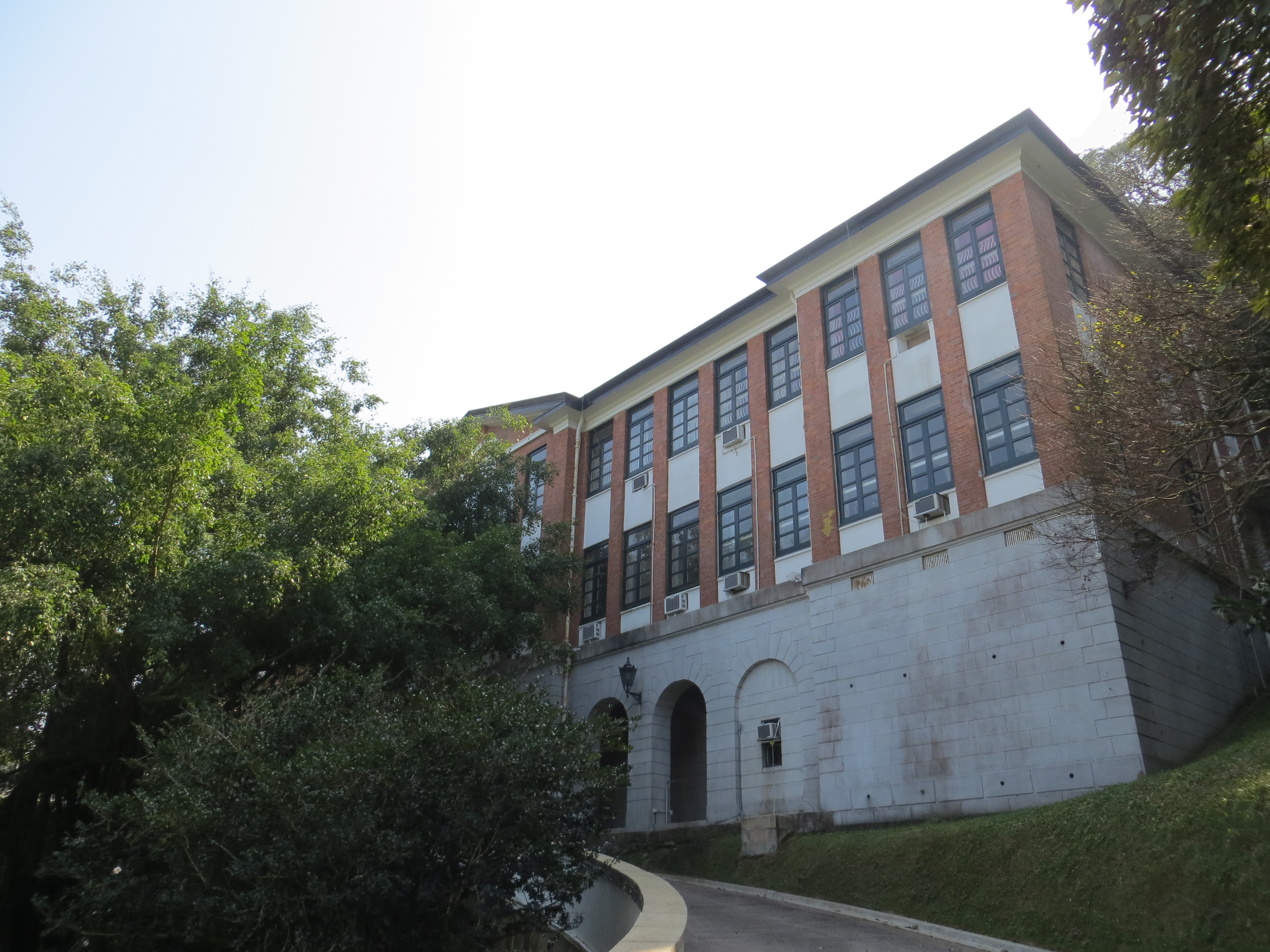
Victoria House, 15 Barker Road, Hong Kong.

The Chief Secretary resides at an official residence at 15 Barker Road, The Peak, Hong Kong, which is also known as Victoria House and Victoria Flats.

== See also ==
- Hong Kong Government
- Government departments and agencies in Hong Kong
- Secretary for Justice (Hong Kong)
- Financial Secretary (Hong Kong)
- Secretary for Education and Manpower
- Secretary for Health, Welfare and Food
- Lieutenant Governor of Hong Kong - second in command from 1843 to 1870s
