= Caldecott Road =

Road in Piper's Hill, Hong Kong

Caldecott Road (Chinese: 郝德傑道; Jyutping: kok^{3}dak^{1}git^{6}dou^{6}) is a road in Piper's Hill, Hong Kong, named after Sir Andrew Caldecott, the 19th Governor of Hong Kong. The two-lane road links Tai Po Road and a fresh water reservoir in Butterfly Valley. The road is the location of a high-end neighbourhood, home to multiple luxury apartments and Po Leung Kuk Choi Kai Yau School, built on the former site of Sir Robert Black College of Education.

In 2022, a colonial-era boundary stone marking the border between New Kowloon and the New Territories was rediscovered by local hikers near Caldecott Road.

== See also ==
- List of streets and roads in Hong Kong § Kowloon and New Kowloon
