= Arnold White =

British racist politician (1848-1925)

Arnold Henry White (1 February 1848 – 5 February 1925) was an English journalist and antisemitic campaigner against immigration.

== Early life ==
In 1879, he married Helen Constance (1849 – 1918), only daughter of Lowell Price of Farnham Royal, Buckinghamshire. She predeceased him and they had one son who was called Murray.

== Politics ==
White investigated the East End of London and wrote an account in The Problems of a Great City (1886). White attacked the 'pauper foreigners' (predominantly Jewish), who blamed for uninhabitable dwellings, increased unemployment, and the spread of socialism (he later declared to Lord Salisbury that ‘an undue proportion of the dangerous anarchists in this country are foreign Jews’. He stood unsuccessfully as a Liberal for Mile End in 1886. However White broke away from the Liberals when Gladstone refused to condemn the Irish Plan of Campaign and stood unsuccessfully as a Liberal Unionist for Tyneside in 1892 and 1895.

White then campaigned against Jewish immigration from Russia, and as an agent of Baron de Hirsch he went to Russia to try to persuade the Tsar's government to found a Jewish colony in Argentina. A eugenicist, White felt that Jewish immigration was reducing England to the world's ‘rubbish heap’.

Geoffrey Alderman has argued that after visiting Russia in 1890, White transitioned towards a stance of virulent racial antisemitism, arguing that the problem of Jews in the UK was ‘not…of numbers, nor of habits, nor of occupations…but the fact that, good, or bad or indifferent the orthodox immigrants belong to a race and cling to a community that prefers to remain aloof from the mainstream of our national life, by shunning intermarriage with Anglo-Saxons’.

In 1899 he published the book The Modern Jew (London, W. Heinemann).

In 1900 White visited the Mediterranean Fleet of the Royal Navy as the guest of Admiral Lord Charles Beresford and in June 1901 he sent the Daily Mail a private letter from Beresford's which complained about naval deficiencies. White was also friends with Admiral Sir John Fisher, who shared an antagonism towards the new German High Fleet. White wrote an article which favoured a preventative attack on this fleet in its harbours which angered the Kaiser and Arthur Balfour. When some English journalists visited Germany in a goodwill mission in April 1907 the Kaiser insisted on White's exclusion.

In 1901 appeared Efficiency and Empire, which is White's best-known book.

In 1903 White was sent to Brixton Prison in contempt of court when he wrote in August 1903 an article for The Sun on the fraudster Whitaker Wright whilst the case was sub judice.

White stood unsuccessfully as an independent for Londonderry North in the 1906 general election.

== Journalism ==
In 1907 he began his column in the weekly newspaper The Referee, writing under the name Vanoc. He also sat on the council for the Eugenics Education Society and supported compulsory military service, which led to the Duke of Bedford becoming his patron.

During the Great War, he wrote The Hidden Hand, which claimed to have uncovered a plot to Germanize Britain. He died in 1925 and requested in his will that on his grave there would be a plain wooden cross inscribed with his name, date of death and the words ‘for England’.
