= David Mercer MacDougall =

Hong Kong politician (1904–1991)

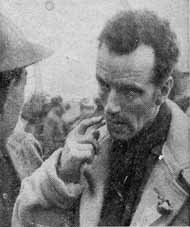
David Mercer MacDougall

David Mercer MacDougall (Chinese: 麥道高; 8 December 1904 – 13 May 1991) was a Colonial Secretary of Hong Kong between 1945 and 1949.

Born in Perth, Scotland, he was educated at Perth Academy and St Andrews University.

In 1928, while a Cadet Officer, MacDougall was seconded to the Colonial Office, and posted to Hong Kong. By 1941 he was part of the Ministry of Information (MoI) in Hong Kong. The Chinese Nationalists had worked undercover with the British Police and Intelligence Services since the Japanese invasion of Southern China in 1938, running a network of Nationalist agents which Admiral Chan Chak had operated. These helped in keeping the local Chinese population on-side, controlling the Triad gangs and identifying Japanese sympathisers. During the Battle of Hong Kong he worked directly with Admiral Chan Chak who had been brought in to assist in matters of the Chinese public morale and civil order within the British colony. MacDougall and Chan were among a total of sixty eight British, Chinese and Danish intelligence, naval and marine personnel saved from the Japanese occupation of Hong Kong by a dramatic break-out in five small torpedo boats on Christmas Day 1941. Eventually making it to Chongqing, MacDougall then travelled on to Burma.

MacDougall was put in charge of the Hong Kong Planning Unit in London in September 1944, charged with preparing for the return of Hong Kong to the UK when the war ended. After Japan surrendered on 15 August 1945 McDougall arrived back in Hong Kong on 7 September 1945 as Chief Civil Affairs Officer with the rank of Brigadier. He had responsibility for Civil Administration, reporting to Admiral Sir Cecil Harcourt who was appointed Commander-in-Chief. MacDougall witnessed the Japanese surrender to Admiral Harcourt in Government House on 16 September.

Civilian rule in Hong Kong was reestablished under Governor Sir Mark Young on 1 May 1946 at which time McDougall became Colonial Secretary reporting to Young. When Young retired, MacDougall served briefly as acting Governor from May 1947 – 25 July 1947.

Chan Chak likewise became Mayor of Canton after the war. He died six weeks before the city fell to Communist forces in 1949.

After his retirement from the Colonial Service in 1949, MacDougall farmed in Suffolk until the late 1960s. Thereafter he divided his time between East Anglia and Scotland. He died in Strathtay, near his home town of Perth, in May 1991 at the age of 86. He had three daughters, Ann, Sheena and Jane.

Government offices
Preceded by Sir Franklin Gimson	Colonial Secretary of Hong Kong; 1945–1949	Succeeded by Sir John Nicoll
Preceded by Sir Mark Young	Governor of Hong Kong (Administrator); May 1947 – 25 July 1947	Succeeded by Sir Alexander Grantham
