= Thomas Southorn =

British colonial administrator (1879–1957)

Sir Thomas Southorn KCMG KBE
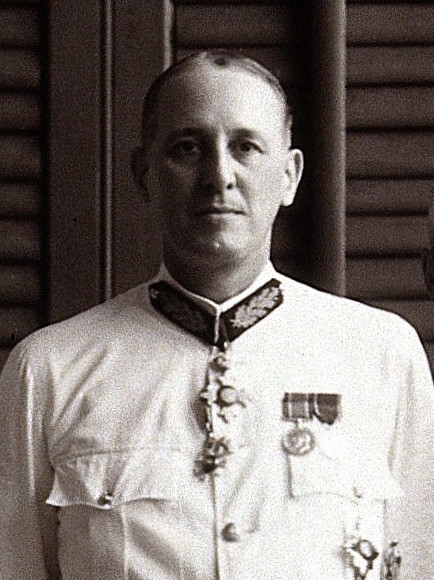

Governor of the Gambia
- In office 22 October 1936 – 23 March 1942
- Monarchs: Edward VIII; George VI
- Preceded by: Arthur Richards
- Succeeded by: Hilary Blood

Colonial Secretary of Hong Kong
- In office 1 May 1925 – 23 March 1936
- Governor: Cecil Clementi; William Peel; Andrew Caldecott
- Preceded by: Claud Severn
- Succeeded by: Norman Lockhart Smith

Personal details
- Born: 4 August 1879
- Died: 15 March 1957 (aged 77)
- Education: Corpus Christi College, Oxford

Thomas Southorn
- Traditional Chinese: 修頓
- Simplified Chinese: 修顿
Transcriptions
Standard Mandarin
- Hanyu Pinyin: Xiūdùn
Yue: Cantonese
- Yale Romanization: Sāu deuhn
- Jyutping: Sau^{1} deon^{6}

Alternative Chinese name
- Traditional Chinese: 蕭敦
- Simplified Chinese: 萧敦
Transcriptions
Standard Mandarin
- Hanyu Pinyin: Xiāodūn
Yue: Cantonese
- Yale Romanization: Sīu dēun
- Jyutping: Siu^{1} deon^{1}

Sir Wilfrid Thomas Southorn KCMG KBE (4 August 1879 – 15 March 1957) (Chinese Translated Name: 修頓, Old Translated Name:蕭敦), known as Tom, was a British colonial administrator, spending the large part of his career in Ceylon (now Sri Lanka) before serving as Colonial Secretary of Hong Kong, then Governor of The Gambia.

== Education ==
He was educated at Warwick School and Corpus Christi College, Oxford.

== Colonial service career ==
He had joined the Ceylon Civil Service in 1903, and was appointed Additional Assistant Colonial Secretary in 1909, Principal Assistant Colonial Secretary in 1920, and Principal Collector of Customs and Chairman of the Post Commission in 1923. He was appointed an Official Member of the Legislative Council of Ceylon in 1924.

He was the Colonial Secretary of Hong Kong from 1925 to 1936 and served as Acting Administrator of the colony from February to March 1930 and from May to September 1935, and then in November the same year, at either end of the tenure of Sir William Peel as governor. His official (summer) residence was Mountain Lodge.

In 1936, he was made Governor of the Gambia, notably describing the colony as "a geographical and economic absurdity". He left The Gambia in March 1942.

== Personal life ==
In 1921 he married author Bella Sidney Woolf (1877–1960), whom he met through her (later) more famous brother Leonard Woolf, when the two men were colleagues in Ceylon. In 1904, then a humble 'Office Assistant', Southorn had met Leonard Woolf on his arrival in Ceylon from England.

== Honours ==
Southorn was appointed a Companion of the Order of St Michael and St George (CMG) in the 1927 Birthday Honours, a Knight Commander of the Order of the British Empire (KBE) in the 1933 Birthday Honours, and promoted to Knight Commander of the Order (KCMG) in the 1938 New Year Honours.

== Legacy ==
Southorn Playground in Wan Chai, Hong Kong was named for him in 1934, while he was Colonial Secretary. Also bearing his name are the associated Southorn Stadium and adjacent Southorn Centre.

Government offices
| Preceded by Sir Claud Severn | Colonial Secretary of Hong Kong; 1925–1936 | Succeeded by Norman Lockhart Smith |
| Preceded by Sir Cecil Clementi | Acting Administrator of Hong Kong; 1930 | Succeeded by Sir William Peel |
| Preceded by Sir William Peel | Acting Administrator of Hong Kong; 1935 | Succeeded by Acting Administrator Norman Smith |
| Preceded by Acting Administrator Norman Smith | Acting Administrator of Hong Kong; 1935 | Succeeded by Sir Andrew Caldecott |
| Preceded by Sir Arthur Frederick Richards | Governor of The Gambia; 1936–1942 | Succeeded by Hilary Rudolph Robert Blood |
