= Norman Lockhart Smith =

British colonial administrator in Hong Kong

Norman Lockhart Smith CMG
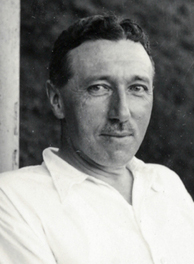
- Smith in 1930

Personal details
- Born: 29 May 1887 Ryton, County Durham, England
- Died: 27 January 1968 (aged 80) Selham, West Sussex, England
- Spouse: Maud Violet Banister (m. 1914)
- Parent: Hugh Crawford Smith (father)

Norman Lockhart Smith CMG (Chinese Translated Name: 史美; 29 May 1887 – 27 January 1968) was a British colonial administrator who served as Acting Administrator of Hong Kong on various occasions.

Smith was born in Ryton, County Durham, England. Smith's father was a businessman and politician Hugh Crawford Smith, who was elected M.P. for Tyneside in 1900. Smith's mother was Hannah Ralston Lockhart. Smith was educated in Sedbergh and attended Queen's College, Oxford. He entered the Hong Kong Civil Service in 1910 and was seconded for military service during the First World War.

In Hong Kong, Smith was appointed principal assistant colonial secretary in 1931, director of education in 1933 and secretary for Chinese affairs in 1934. He served as colonial secretary from 1936 to 1941 and acting governor on several occasions.

In 1962, Smith and Sir Robert Kotewall published translations for The Penguin Book of Chinese Verse.

In 1914, Smith married Maud Violet Banister in Hong Kong. He returned to England after retirement and died in Selham, aged 80.

== Honours ==
- Companion of the Order of St Michael and St George (CMG) (1937)

Government offices
Preceded by Acting Administrator Wilfred Southorn	Acting Administrator of Hong Kong; September - November 1935	Succeeded by Acting Administrator Wilfred Southorn
Preceded by Wilfrid Thomas Southorn	Colonial Secretary of Hong Kong; 1936-1941	Succeeded by Sir Franklin Charles Gimson
Preceded by Sir Andrew Caldecott	Acting Administrator of Hong Kong; April - October 1937	Succeeded by Sir Geoffry Northcote
Preceded by Sir Geoffry Alexander Stafford Northcote	Acting Administrator of Hong Kong; 6–10 September 1941	Succeeded by Sir Mark Aitchison Young
