= Geoffry Northcote =

British colonial administrator (1881–1948)

Sir Geoffry Northcote KCMG KStJ
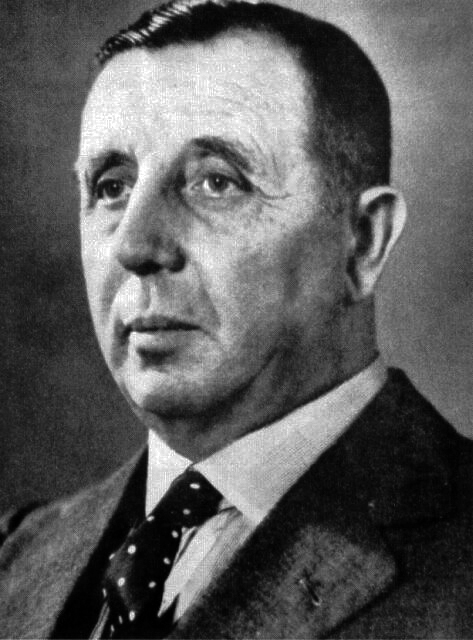

20th Governor of Hong Kong
- In office 28 October 1937 – 6 September 1941
- Monarch: George VI
- Colonial Secretary: Norman Lockhart Smith
- Preceded by: Sir Andrew Caldecott
- Succeeded by: Sir Mark Aitchison Young

Personal details
- Born: Geoffry Alexander Stafford Northcote; 9 February 1881
- Died: 10 July 1948 (aged 67) Sanderstead, Surrey, England
- Spouse: Edith Juliet Mary Adams
- Education: Balliol College, Oxford
- Profession: colonial administrator

Chinese name
- Traditional Chinese: 羅富國
- Simplified Chinese: 罗富国
Transcriptions
Standard Mandarin
- Hanyu Pinyin: Luó Fùguó
Yue: Cantonese
- Jyutping: lo4 fu3 gwok3

Sir Geoffry Alexander Stafford Northcote, KCMG KStJ (羅富國;9 February 1881 – 10 July 1948) was a British colonial administrator.

== Early life, education, and early colonial services career ==
Northcote was the son of Reverend the Hon. Arthur Francis Northcote, fourth son of the 1st Earl of Iddesleigh. The 1st Baron Northcote was his uncle. He was educated at Blundell's School in Tiverton and Balliol College, Oxford. He entered the Colonial Service in 1904 and served in Kenya (the East African Protectorate) from 1904 to 1927. He became Chief Secretary of Northern Rhodesia a year later, and served there until 1930. Afterwards, Northcote served as the Chief Secretary of Gold Coast, until 1934 and as Governor and Commander-in-Chief of British Guiana from 1935 to 1937.

== Attack in Kenya ==
When he arrived in Kenya in 1904 as a political attache, Northcote was posted to Nyanza Province which was then part of Uganda. In early 1905, he accompanied a punitive expedition to Kisii land in South Nyanza. The expedition seized and slaughtered livestock and torched houses as punishment for raids the Kisii had carried out on neighbouring groups. In 1907, Northcote was deployed as the District Commissioner of Kisii. The Kisii, who nicknamed him Nyarigoti, considered him their mortal enemy. On 18 January 1908, in the middle of a punitive expedition he was leading, Northcote was repulsed with a spear and injured by a warrior called Otenyo, who was defending against the British colonial incursion. When Otenyo was caught, he was executed in public by a firing squad and then beheaded. When Northcote learned of these attacks to revenge the attack on him, which ended up costing 160 lives, he wrote to his father, "It would take too long to describe the idiocy, obstinacy and want of military operations."

== Hong Kong Governorship ==
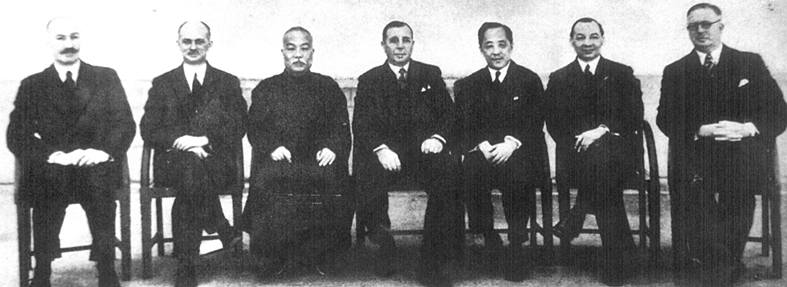
Sir Geoffry Northcote (centre) and his secretaries; businessman Robert Kotewall is 2nd on the right

He became Governor and Commander-in-Chief of Hong Kong in 1937. During his tenure, the Second Sino-Japanese War broke out, and battles broke out throughout mainland China. In order to safeguard the Colony, Northcote immediately declared Hong Kong a neutral zone. As the war proceeded, Canton (Guangzhou) was occupied by the Japanese, causing a population boom as refugees rushed into Hong Kong. Northcote proposed more provision of housing and social services to serve the needs of the poor. Meanwhile, the Imperial Japanese Army (IJA) also started encroaching upon Sham Chun (Shenzhen), leading the Hong Kong government to adopt various measures to cope with the emergency, such as the construction of air-raid shelters and blackout practices. Northcote also withdrew the plan of expanding social services.

After taking six-months' leave in the UK, Northcote returned to Hong Kong in March 1941. Poor health forced him to retire that year, and he left when his appointment expired in September 1941.

== Personal life ==
Northcote married Edith Juliet Mary Adams on 27 October 1910; she was the daughter of James Adams VC. The couple had three sons: Maxwell Adams Stafford, Arthur Geoffrey Stafford, and Amyas Henry Stafford. Northcote died in July 1948, aged 67.

== Honours ==
- C.M.G., 1931
- K.C.M.G., 1935
- K.St.J. 1937

== Places named after him ==
Northcote Close, a road on Hong Kong Island, and Northcote Teachers' College (the premises is now occupied by Bonham Road Government Primary School) were named after him.

== See also ==
- History of Hong Kong
- Earl of Iddesleigh
- Warrior Otenyo

== Notes ==
Government offices
Preceded by Alexander Ransford Slater	Governor of the Gold Coast, acting 1932	Succeeded by Sir Shenton Thomas
Preceded by Sir Shenton Thomas	Governor of the Gold Coast, acting 1934	Succeeded by Sir Arnold Wienholt Hodgson
Preceded by Sir Edward Brandis Denham	Governor of British Guiana; 1935–1937	Succeeded by Sir Wilfrid Edward Francis Jackson
Preceded by Sir Andrew Caldecott	Governor of Hong Kong; 1937–1941	Succeeded by Sir Mark Aitchison Young
