= Cecil Clementi =

British colonial administrator (1875-1947)

Sir Cecil Clementi GCMG KStJ FRGS
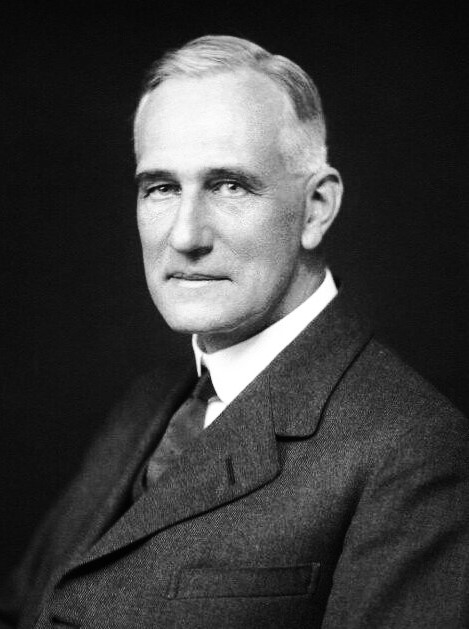
- Portrait, early 1930s

20th Governor of Straits Settlements
- In office 5 February 1930 – 17 February 1934
- Monarch: George V
- Colonial Secretary: Sir John Scott
- Preceded by: Sir Hugh Charles Clifford
- Succeeded by: Sir Andrew Caldecott (Acting); Sir Shenton Whitelegge Thomas

17th Governor of Hong Kong
- In office 1 November 1925 – 1 February 1930
- Monarch: George V
- Colonial Secretary: Sir Claud Severn; Sir Thomas Southorn
- Preceded by: Reginald Edward Stubbs
- Succeeded by: William Peel

Acting Governor of British Ceylon
- In office 1 April 1925 – 18 October 1925
- Monarch: George V
- Preceded by: William Henry Manning
- Succeeded by: Edward Bruce Alexander (Acting governor)

Personal details
- Born: 1 September 1875 Cawnpore, North-Western Provinces, British India
- Died: 5 April 1947 (aged 71) High Wycombe, Buckinghamshire, England, United Kingdom
- Citizenship: British
- Spouse: Marie Penelope Rose Eyres
- Education: Magdalen College, Oxford (BA, MA)
- Profession: colonial administrator, merchant

Chinese name
- Chinese: 金文泰
Transcriptions
Standard Mandarin
- Hanyu Pinyin: Jīn Wéntài
Yue: Cantonese
- Yale Romanization: Gām Màhn Taai
- Jyutping: Gam1 Man4 Taai3

Sir Cecil Clementi GCMG KStJ FRGS (Chinese: 金文泰; Jyutping: Gam1 Man4 Taai3; Pe̍h-ōe-jī: Kim-bûn-thài; 1 September 1875 – 5 April 1947) was a British colonial administrator who served as Governor of Hong Kong from 1925 to 1930, and Governor and Commander-in-Chief of the Straits Settlements from 1930 to 1934.

== Early life and education ==
Born in Cawnpore (presently Kanpur), India, Clementi was the son of Colonel Montagu Clementi, Judge Advocate General in India, and his wife, Isabel Collard. He attended St Paul's School and Magdalen College, Oxford, where he studied Sanskrit and the classics. In 1896, he achieved a first-class result in mods, and was awarded a Boden Scholarship in Sanskrit in 1897. He received honourable mentions for the Hertford (1895), Ireland (1896) and Craven (1896) scholarships.

Clementi was proxime accessit (runner-up) for the Gaisford Greek Prose prize in 1897, and obtained his B.A. (2nd class lit. hum., i.e. classics) in 1898. He was also proxime accessit for the Chancellor's Latin Essay prize in 1899, and obtained his M.A. in 1901.

== Early colonial service ==
In 1899, Clementi placed fourth in the competitive examinations for the civil service, which allowed him his choice of postings. His choice was Hong Kong, and upon his arrival, he was sent up to Canton, where he was a land officer until forced to return to Hong Kong by the events of the Boxer Rebellion. Clementi's facility with languages was demonstrated when he passed the Cantonese examination in 1900, and the Pekingese examination six years later, in 1906.

After serving as an Assistant Registrar General in 1901, Clementi joined as a member of the Board of Examiners in Chinese, in 1902. In 1902, Clementi was seconded for special service under the government of India and was created J.P. in that same year. A year later, he was seconded for famine relief work in Kwangsi (Guangxi). A year afterwards, Clementi was appointed Member of Land Court, Assistant Land Officer and Police Magistrate at New Territories, Hong Kong, a position he served in until 1906.

Due to his performance in the services, Clementi was promoted to Assistant Colonial Secretary and Clerk of Council in 1907. While he was in that position, Clementi represented the Hong Kong government in the International Opium Conference in Shanghai in 1909. A year later, he became the Private Secretary to the Administrator at that time, Sir Francis Henry May. Clementi eventually became Acting Colonial Secretary and Member of both the Executive and Legislative Councils of Hong Kong. He would remain there until 1912.

Clementi played a part in the founding of the University of Hong Kong. Indeed, he wrote the words, in Latin, of the University Anthem, first performed on 11 March 1912.

In 1913, Clementi was appointed colonial secretary of British Guiana, a post he held until 1922. From there, he was named the colonial secretary of Ceylon, where he served until 1925. Each position imparted considerable responsibility, and on more than one occasion, he was in charge of administering the entire government of his area of responsibility. Whilst in Ceylon, he served as president of the Ceylon Branch of the Royal Asiatic Society in 1924.

== Governor of Hong Kong ==
In 1925, Clementi was appointed as Governor of Hong Kong, a position to which his fluency in Cantonese suited him well and in which he served until 1930.

During his tenure, the Canton–Hong Kong strike, which crippled the Hong Kong economy, was resolved though primarily through Kuomintang intervention rather than that of Clementi and Kai Tak Airport entered operation (it would operate until Hong Kong International Airport opened and took over as the main airport in 1998). He was also in charge but unsupportive of efforts by local Chinese and British elites as well as intervention from both the Colonial Office and the League of Nations to end the practice of Mui Tsai, the traditional Chinese "female maid servitude" system which often resulted in the abuse of young servant girls. He also appointed Shouson Chow, a prominent Chinese merchant, as the first unofficial member of the Executive Council. At the same time, he increased the numbers of official and non-official ("Unofficial") members in the Legislative Council from eight to ten (including the Governor) and from six to eight, respectively. He invited one Chinese and one Portuguese (Jose Pedro Braga) to be Unofficials.

Clementi opposed Kuomintang's 1926 Northern Expedition against northern Chinese warlords and advocated British arms support to Peking, a move rejected by London. To counter the growing radicalization of the Chinese intelligentsia against colonialism and imperialism after the May Fourth Movement, he proposed a revised school curriculum in Chinese language that stressed loyalty and traditional Chinese values. He advocated for the training of more teachers in the Chinese language and the establishment of a Chinese Department at the University of Hong Kong.

== Governorship of the Straits Settlements ==
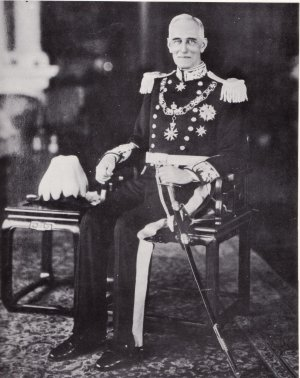
Sir Cecil, as the Governor of Straits Settlements

After his tenure as Governor of Hong Kong ended, Clementi went on to serve his last post in the Colonial Services as Governor and Commander-in-Chief of the Straits Settlements, which included Singapore, and High Commissioner for the Malay States, from 5 February 1930 to 17 February 1934. He handed over to Sir Andrew Caldecott, who became acting Governor, and left for England due to his illness. The position of Governor was later filled by Sir Shenton Thomas on 9 November 1934.

Six years later, in 1940, Clementi became the Master of the Mercers' Company.

== Personal life ==
Clementi was the nephew of the Cecil Clementi Smith (1860–1916), Governor of the Straits Settlements and High Commissioner in the period 1887 to 1893. He was also the great-grandson of the Italian-born musician Muzio Clementi.

Clementi married Marie Penelope Rose Eyres, daughter of Admiral Cresswell John Eyres, in 1912. The couple had one son, Cresswell, and three daughters.

Clementi died in High Wycombe, England, on 5 April 1947.

== Honours ==
- C.M.G., 1916
- K.C.M.G., 1926
- G.C.M.G., 1931
- K.St.J., 1926
- Fellow, Royal Geographical Society (F.R.G.S.)
- Member, Royal Asiatic Society (M.R.A.S.)
- Honorary Fellow, Magdalen College, Oxford, 1938
- Recipient, Cuthbert Peek Award of the Royal Geographical Society, 1912
- Honours LL.D. degree, Hong Kong University, 1925

== Publications ==
- Cantonese Love Songs. Clarendon Press (1904)
- Summary of Geographical Observations taken during a Journey from Kashgar to Kowloon. Noronha & Co. (1911)
- Pervigilium Veneris, The vigil of Venus. Blackwell (1911)
- Bibliographical and other studies on the Pervigilium Veneris. Blackwell (1913)
- The Chinese in British Guiana. The Argosy Company Limited (1915)
- Elements in Analysis of Thought. Blackwell (1933)
- A Constitutional History of British Guiana. Macmillan (1937) – a definitive work on the constitution of colonial British Guiana

== Namesakes ==
- The entire planning area of Clementi in Singapore is named after him.
  - Clementi Town Secondary School, Singapore
  - Clementi MRT station, Singapore
  - Clementi Police Division, Singapore
  - Clementi Public Library, Singapore
- Cecile Mountain, Cameron Highland, Malaysia
- Clementi Secondary School, Hong Kong
- Clementi Road, Hong Kong
- Cecil Clementi Street, Kanpur
- Sir Cecil's Ride (金督馳馬徑), Hong Kong

== See also ==
- History of Hong Kong

Government offices
Preceded by William Henry Manning	Acting; Governor of Ceylon; 1925	Succeeded by Edward Bruce Alexander (Acting Governor)
Preceded by Reginald Edward Stubbs	Governor of Hong Kong; 1925–1930	Succeeded by Sir Wilfrid Southorn (Acting Administrator)
Preceded by Sir Hugh Charles Clifford	Governor of Straits Settlements & British High Commissioner in Malaya; 1930–1934	Succeeded by Sir Andrew Caldecott (Acting Governor); Sir Shenton Whitelegge Thomas
