= J. M. Robertson =

Scottish journalist and rationalist (1856–1933)

John Mackinnon Robertson
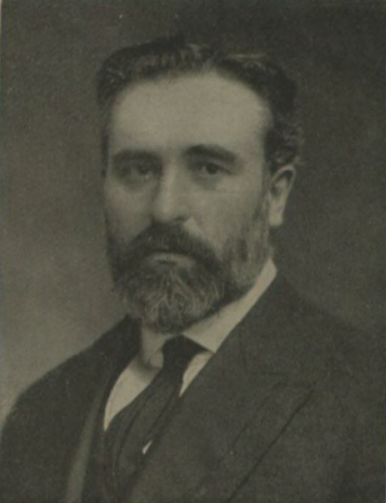
- Born: 14 November 1856; Brodick, Isle of Arran, Scotland
- Died: 5 January 1933 (aged 76); London, England
- Occupations: Journalist, politician, rationalist, writer

John Mackinnon Robertson PC (14 November 1856 – 5 January 1933) was a prolific Scottish journalist, advocate of rationalism and secularism, and Liberal Member of Parliament for Tyneside from 1906 to 1918.

Robertson was best known as an advocate of the Christ myth theory.

== Biography ==
Robertson was born in Brodick on the Isle of Arran; his father moved the family to Stirling while he was still young, and he attended school there until the age of 13. He worked first as a clerk and then as a journalist, eventually becoming assistant editor of the Edinburgh Evening News.

He wrote in February 1906 to a friend that he "gave up the 'divine'" when he was a teenager. His first contact with the freethought movement was a lecture by Charles Bradlaugh in Edinburgh in 1878. Robertson became active in the Edinburgh Secular Society, soon after. It was through the Edinburgh Secular Society that he met William Archer and became writer for the Edinburgh Evening News. He eventually moved to London to become assistant editor of Bradlaugh's paper National Reformer, subsequently taking over as editor on Bradlaugh's death in 1891. The National Reformer finally closed in 1893. Robertson was also an appointed lecturer for the freethinking South Place Ethical Society from 1899 until the 1920s.

An advocate of the "New Liberalism," Robertson's political radicalism developed in the 1880s and 1890s, and he first stood for Parliament in 1895, failing to win Bradlaugh's old Northampton seat as an independent radical liberal. In the 1906 General Election he was successful as the official Liberal candidate at Tynemouth. Robertson was a staunch free trader and his Trade and Tariffs (1908) "became a bible for free-traders pursuing the case for cheap food and the expansion of trade".

In 1915 he was appointed to the Privy Council.

At the 1918 United Kingdom general election, as a Liberal candidate he contested Wallsend, a constituency based largely on his Tyneside seat, but finished third. He contested the 1923 United Kingdom general election as Liberal candidate for Hendon without success.

Robertson died in London in 1933.

Homer Smith has described Robertson as an "outstanding exponent of rationalism and one of the foremost scholars produced in England in the last six decades."

== Electoral record ==
General election 1895: Northampton (2 seats)
Party	Candidate	Votes	%	±%
Liberal	Henry Labouchère	4,884	27.0	−4.1
Conservative	Adolphus Drucker	3,820	21.0	+2.5
Lib-Lab	Edward Harford	3,703	20.4	−9.1
Conservative	Jacob Jacobs	3,394	18.7	−2.2
Social Democratic Federation	Frederick George Jones	1,216	6.7	n/a
Independent Liberal	John Mackinnon Robertson	1,131	6.2	n/a
Majority		117	0.6	
Turnout			83.5	+2.3
Liberal hold		Swing		
Conservative gain from Liberal		Swing		

Robertson

General election 1906: Tyneside
Party	Candidate	Votes	%	±%
Liberal	John Mackinnon Robertson	11,496	62.5	+11.2
Conservative	James Knott	6,885	37.5	−11.2
Majority		4,611	25.0	+22.4
Turnout			79.3	+4.4
Liberal gain from Liberal Unionist		Swing	+11.2	

General election January 1910: Tyneside
Party	Candidate	Votes	%	±%
Liberal	John Mackinnon Robertson	13,158	62.8	+0.3
Conservative	Alfred Cochrane	7,807	37.2	−0.3
Majority		5,351	25.6	+0.6
Turnout			81.5	+2.2
Liberal hold		Swing	+0.3	

General election December 1910: Tyneside
Party	Candidate	Votes	%	±%
Liberal	John Mackinnon Robertson	11,693	63.0	+0.2
Conservative	Helenus Macaulay Robertson	6,857	37.0	−0.2
Majority		4,836	26.0	+0.4
Turnout			72.1	−9.4
Liberal hold		Swing	+0.2	

Robertson

General election 1918: Wallsend
Party	Candidate	Votes	%	±%
National Democratic	Matt Simm	10,246		n/a
Labour	John Chapman	6,835		n/a
Liberal	John Mackinnon Robertson	3,047		n/a
Majority		3,411		n/a
Turnout				n/a
National Democratic win				

General election 1923: Hendon
Party	Candidate	Votes	%	±%
Unionist	Philip Lloyd-Graeme	13,278	51.9	−10.9
Liberal	John Mackinnon Robertson	7,324	28.6	+8.2
Labour	Charles Latham	5,005	19.5	+2.7
Majority		5,954	23.3	−3.5
Turnout			67.3	
Unionist hold		Swing	-9.6	

== Political views ==
Economically, Robertson has been described as an underconsumptionist, and he gave an early form, perhaps the earliest formal statement, of the paradox of thrift in his 1892 book The Fallacy of Saving. He was in favour of the payment of MPs, the abolition of the House of Lords and the establishment of adult suffrage, including giving votes to women.

== Christ myth theory ==
Robertson was an advocate of the Christ myth theory, and in several books he argued that Jesus was not a historical person, but was an invention by a first-century Jewish messianic cult of Joshua, whom he identifies as a solar deity. In Robertson's view, religious groups invent new gods to fit the needs of the society of the time. Robertson argued that a solar deity symbolized by the lamb and the ram had long been worshiped by an Israelite cult of Joshua and that this cult had then invented a new messianic figure, Jesus of Nazareth. Robertson argued that a possible source for the Christian myth may have been the Talmudic story of the executed Jesus Pandera which dates to 100 BC. He wrote that possible origins were: a would-be messiah who preached "a political doctrine subversive of the Roman rule, and to have thereby met his death"; and a "Galilean faith-healer with a local reputation [who] may have been slain as a human sacrifice at some time of social tumult".

Robertson considered the letters of Paul the earliest surviving Christian writings, but viewed them as primarily concerned with theology and morality, rather than historical details:

The older portions of the Pauline epistles show no knowledge of any Jesuine biography or any Jesuine teaching —a circumstance which suggests that the Jesus of Paul is much more remote from Paul's day than is admitted by the records.

Robertson viewed references to the twelve apostles and the institution of the Eucharist as stories that must have developed later among gentile believers who were converted by Jewish evangelists like Paul.

Oxford theologian and orientalist Frederick Cornwallis Conybeare wrote a book titled, The Historical Christ; or, An investigation of the views of Mr. J. M. Robertson, Dr. A. Drews, and Prof. W. B. Smith (1913), directed against the Christ myth theory defended by the three authors.

== Selected works ==
- Modern Humanists (1891)
- The Fallacy of Saving – A Study in Economics (1892)
- Miscellanies (1898)
- History of Freethought in the Nineteenth Century, (1899)
- Christianity and Mythology. Watts. 1900. (1900)
- Studies in Religious Fallacy (1900)
- A Short History of Christianity. Watts & Co. 1902. (1902)
- Pagan Christs – Studies in Comparative Hierology. Watts & Co. 1911 [1903].
- Letters on Reasoning. Watts. 1902. (1905, 2nd edition)
- A Short History of Freethought: Ancient and Modern Volume 1, Volume 2 (1906)
- Rationalism (1912)
- The Baconian Heresy: A Confutation (1913)
- The Historical Jesus: A Survey of Positions (1916)
- The Jesus Problem: Restatement of the Myth Theory (1917)
- Shakespeare and Chapman (1917)
- Short History of Morals (1920)
- Explorations (1923)
- The Shakespeare Canon (1922–1932)
- Jesus and Judas (1927)
- A Short History of Christianity (third edition, 1931)

== Sources ==
- Robertson, John M. (1900). Christianity And Mythology. London: Watts & Co. (Reprinted (2004) Whitefish, MT: Kessinger Publishing ISBN 0766187683)
- Robertson, John M. (1902). A Short History of Christianity. London: Watts & Co. (Reprinted (2004) Whitefish, MT: Kessinger Publishing ISBN 0766189090)
- Van Voorst, Robert E. (2000). Jesus Outside the New Testament: An Introduction to the Ancient Evidence. Wm. B. Eerdmans Publishing. ISBN 978-0-8028-4368-5.
- Wells, G. A. (1987). J.M. Robertson (1856-1933): liberal, rationalist, and scholar. Pemberton. ISBN 978-0-30187-002-1.

Parliament of the United Kingdom
Preceded by Hugh Crawford Smith	Member of Parliament for Tyneside; 1906–1918	Constituency abolished
Political offices
Preceded by Harold Tennant	Parliamentary Secretary to the Board of Trade; 1911–1915	Succeeded by E. G. Pretyman
Party political offices
Preceded by George Lunn	President of the National Liberal Federation; 1920–1923	Succeeded by Donald Maclean
