= Franklin Gimson =

Colonial Administrator

Sir Franklin Gimson KCMG KStJ
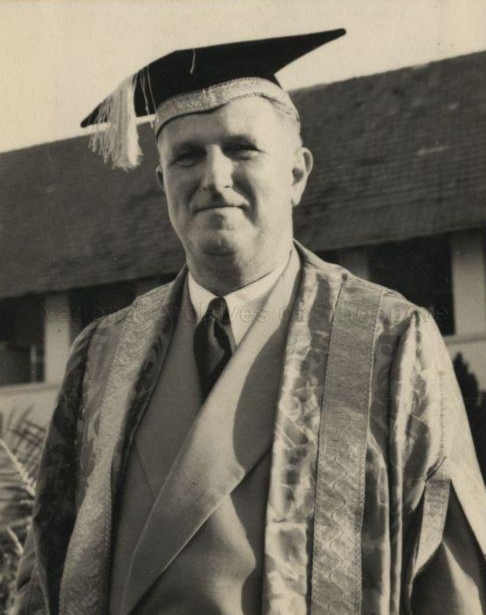
- Gimson in 1951

1st Governor of Singapore
- In office 1 April 1946 – 15 November 1952
- Monarchs: George VI; Elizabeth II
- Preceded by: Office established
- Succeeded by: John Nicoll

Governor of Hong Kong
- Provisional Governor
- In office 28 August 1945 – 30 August 1945
- Monarch: George VI
- Preceded by: Hisakazu Tanaka
- Succeeded by: Cecil Harcourt

Personal details
- Born: Franklin Charles Gimson; 10 September 1890 Barrow-on-Soar, Leicestershire, England
- Died: 13 February 1975 (aged 84) Pickering, North Yorkshire, England

Sir Franklin Charles Gimson KCMG KStJ (10 September 1890 – 13 February 1975) was a British colonial administrator who served as Governor of Singapore from 1946 to 1952.

Gimson assumed the post of the Colonial Secretary of Hong Kong in December 1941. However, his appointment was interrupted by the Battle of Hong Kong. He became a prisoner of war when then Governor Sir Mark Young surrendered to the Imperial Japanese Army on Christmas Day 1941. After spending more than three years in Stanley Internment Camp as an internee, Gimson was freed in August 1945, upon the Liberation of Hong Kong. He formed a short-lived provisional government and briefly declared himself "acting governor", but this administration was soon replaced when Rear Admiral Cecil Harcourt established the military government following in September.

Gimson was the first Governor of Singapore from 1946 to 1952 and reinstalled the civil administration in Singapore. During his governorship, he witnessed the establishment of the legislative council and the executive council in 1947. His governorship was also marked by the increasingly unstable political situation which was provoked by the Malayan Emergency, and the controversial legislation of the Internal Security Act.

== Early life and education ==
Gimson was born on 10 September 1890 in Barrow-on-Soar, Leicestershire, England, to the Rev. Charles Keightley Gimson. He was educated at Cheltenham Grammar School and Balliol College, Oxford, where he graduated BA.

== Civil career ==
Gimson entered the British Ceylon Civil Service as a cadet in November 1914. In the beginning he was attached to the Office of the Naval Intelligence Officer in addition to his own duties. Later on he became an additional police magistrate in Colombo. In 1918 he was sent on military service during the First World War and returned to the colonial administration as an additional assistant colonial chief secretary in July 1919. Two months later he was transferred to North Central Province as assistant government agent.

Gimson was appointed additional assistant colonial secretary for the second time in March 1920 and was promoted to the post of 4th assistant colonial secretary in September 1920. Subsequently, he was sent to Mannar as acting assistant government agent in February 1922. In February 1924, he was promoted to the Customs Department as landing surveyor and acted as acting deputy controller from March to May in 1928. Gimson left the Customs in March 1929 and was appointed as an additional assistant to the Director of Education. Later in July 1931 he became secretary to the Minister of Education.

In February 1932, Gimson was appointed assistant government agent of Trincomalee and in December 1933, appointed assistant government agent of Kegalle. In August 1935, he was involved in a special duty to help organise the forthcoming general election of members of the state council. Afterwards, he was appointed the chairman of the Municipal Council of Kandy in June 1936 but was eventually given the post of Controller of Labour in 1937. Gimson held this office until 1941 and he gained the rank of class one officer in 1938.

=== Colonial secretary of Hong Kong ===
Gimson was promoted to the post of Colonial Secretary of Hong Kong in 1941 and arrived at the colony on 7 December, just the day before the Japanese Army initiated its unexpected and sudden large-scale invasion to Hong Kong. The defence forces of Hong Kong soon lost in the Battle of Hong Kong and the then governor, Sir Mark Young, was forced to surrender on 25 December, which is now known as the Black Christmas. After the Japanese victory, all British officials were arrested and were under Japanese rule. Since the Governor was interned elsewhere, Gimson became the representative of the former government who was responsible for dealing with the Japanese over the issue of transfer of power. For some time he even set up a provisional liaison office in Prince's Building, Central.

In March 1942, Gimson was finally sent to Stanley Internment Camp, where most British colonial officials and expatriates were interned. During the internment, the British civilian internees established the "British Communal Council", which tried in a limited way to maintain the life and order in the camp. As the highest-ranking British official in the camp, Gimson became the chairman of the council and was also responsible to negotiate with the Japanese on matters relating to the camp.

After three years and eight months of Japanese occupation, the Emperor of Japan finally announced an unconditional surrender to the Allies on 15 August 1945. Immediately after the unconditional surrender was made, the Japanese authority had to continue to maintain the order of Hong Kong as the Allies were still on the way to take over. However, all the prohibitions and regulations set by the Japanese were entirely lifted and abolished instantly. On the other hand, on the eve of the surrender of Japan, the British Ambassador to China, Sir Horace Seymour, had already tried to make contact with Gimson from Chongqing, urging him to exercise the sovereignty on behalf of the British government. Although Seymour's order arrived late on 23 August, Gimson had declared himself "acting governor" and had started to prepare for a "provisional government" on 16 August after knowing Japanese had surrendered. Receiving Seymour's order on 23 August, Gimson and other internees left the camp and took over the authority from Japan. Gimson was sworn as acting governor by Chief Justice Atholl MacGregor. He and other former colonial officials set up the headquarters of the provisional government in the Former French Mission Building. On 27 August, Gimson made a further announcement through radio, stating the provisional government had been established. Nevertheless, at the beginning of the provisional rule, the government had to rely on the Japanese troops to maintain the order of Hong Kong since the power of the administration was limited.

On 30 August 1945, Rear Admiral Cecil Harcourt and his warships entered Victoria Harbour. Since Harcourt was asked to form a military government by London, Gimson transferred the power to him and the military government was officially formed on 1 September. Harcourt himself became the head of the military government and Gimson was appointed lieutenant governor by him. Yet, the creation of the office of lieutenant governor was deemed unsuitable by the Colonial Office and therefore Gimson was soon replaced by a chief civil affairs officer and his team sent from London on 7 September. Gimson himself was in fact in poor health as a result of more than three years of internment. For health reasons, he left for the United Kingdom on 16 September. On the day before his departure, he commented in a radio programme that Hong Kong should undergo political reform in the future.

=== Governor of Singapore ===
After spending some time recovering in the United Kingdom, Gimson became governor and commander-in-chief of Singapore when the Straits Settlements colony came to an end on 1 April 1946. He abolished the military government which had been set up by Lord Louis Mountbatten (as he then was) in 1945, and reinstalled a colonial civil administration. As Singapore was now a separate Crown colony, both legislative and executive councils of Singapore were established. In the first two years of Gimson’s governorship, the recovery of the economy in Singapore was slow, and in 1947 a large riot broke out. In March 1948, Gimson allowed six of the twenty-five seats in the legislative council to be elected.

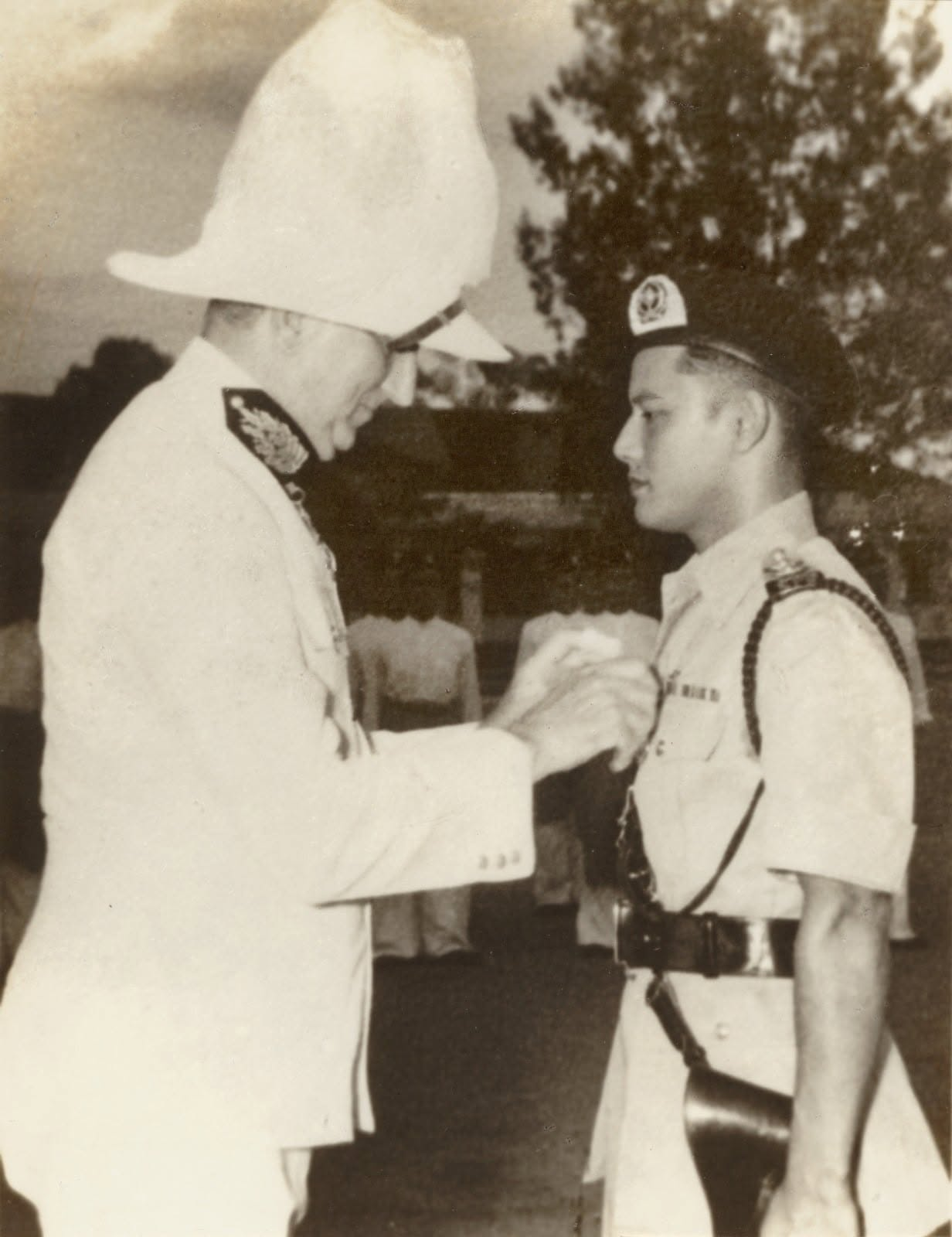
Gimson (left) awarding Halford Boudewyn the Colonial Police Medal in 1948.

In June 1948, an armed insurgency by communist groups in Malaya broke out, and the British imposed harsh measures to control left-wing groups in both Singapore and Malaya; the controversial Internal Security Act, which allowed indefinite detention without trial for persons suspected of being "threats to security", was enacted in Singapore at this time. Since the left-wing groups were the strongest critics of the colonial system, progress on self-government stalled for several years. The colonial government also tried to prevent contact between Singaporean Chinese and the People's Republic of China, which was proclaimed by Mao Zedong in October 1949. Tan Kah Kee, a Singapore businessman and philanthropist, made a trip to China in 1949 and was denied re-entry into Singapore when he planned to return in 1950.

In April 1950, Gimson was the target of an unsuccessful assassination attempt in Singapore: as he left a boxing event at which he had been presenting prizes, a grenade was thrown at him which bounced off his leg and exploded harmlessly some distance away.

A second legislative council election was held in 1951 with the number of elected seats increased to nine, but the colonial administration was still dominant. Gimson retired from the colonial service the following year and left Singapore on the P&O Liner Corfu on 20 March 1952. He was succeeded in the post of governor by John Nicoll, another former Colonial Secretary of Hong Kong.

== Personal life ==
Gimson married Margaret Dorothy Ward in 1922. She was appointed MBE in the 1936 New Year Honours for services during a malaria epidemic in Ceylon. The couple had two daughters.

After retirement from civil service, Gimson spent his time back in the United Kingdom in retirement. He died in his house, "Applegarth", in Thornton-le-Dale, near Pickering, North Yorkshire, on 13 February 1975, aged 84.

== Honours ==
- 1945 : Companion of the Order of St Michael and St George (CMG)
- 1946 : Knight Commander of the Order of St Michael and St George (KCMG)
- 1950 : Knight of Justice of the Order of St John (KStJ)

=== Others ===
- Honorary Doctor of Law (presented by the University of Malaya in 1952)
- Member of the Royal Commonwealth Society
- Freeman of the City of Singapore

Government offices
Preceded by Norman Lockhart Smith	Colonial Secretary of Hong Kong; 1941	Vacant Japanese occupation of Hong Kong Title next held by David MacDougall
Preceded by Hisaichi Tanaka as Governor-General of Hong Kong; Japanese occupation of Hong Kong	Governor of Hong Kong; Provisional Government; 28–30 August 1945	Succeeded by Sir Cecil Harcourt as Administrator of Hong Kong
Preceded by Sir Shenton Thomas as Governor of Straits Settlements	Governor of Singapore; 1946–1952	Succeeded by Wilfred Lawson Blythe (acting); Sir John Nicoll
