= William Peel (colonial administrator) =

British colonial administrator (1875–1945)

Sir William Peel KCMG KBE
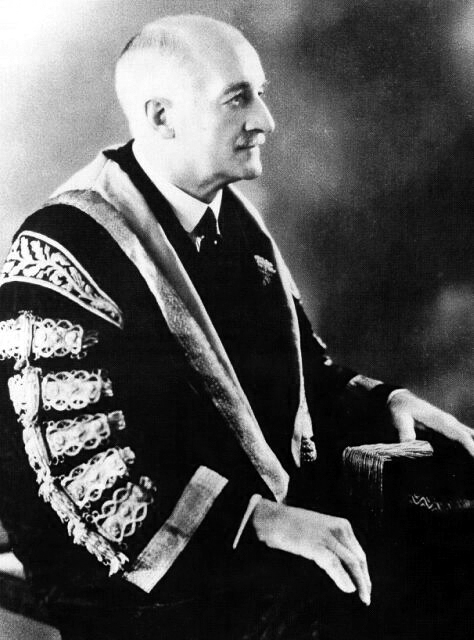
- Portrait c. 1930–35

18th Governor of Hong Kong
- In office 9 May 1930 – 17 May 1935
- Monarch: George V
- Colonial Secretary: Sir Thomas Southorn
- Preceded by: Sir Cecil Clementi
- Succeeded by: Sir Andrew Caldecott

Personal details
- Born: 27 February 1875 Hexham, England, UK
- Died: 24 February 1945 (aged 69) London, UK
- Spouse: Violet Mary Drake
- Education: Queens' College, Cambridge
- Occupation: colonial administrator

Chinese name
- Traditional Chinese: 貝璐
- Simplified Chinese: 贝璐
Transcriptions
Yue: Cantonese
- Jyutping: bui3 lou6

Sir William Peel KCMG KBE (Chinese: 貝璐; 27 February 1875 – 24 February 1945) was a British colonial administrator who served as Governor of Hong Kong.

== Early life ==
Peel was born in Hexham, Northumberland, England. He was the son of Rev. W. E. Peel of Boston Spa in Yorkshire. He attended Silcoates School and later Queens' College, Cambridge.

== Early Colonial Services ==
He became a cadet in the Colonial Service in British Malaya in 1897 and was soon promoted to Acting District Officer of Nibong Tebal in 1898 and Bukit Mertajam in 1899 and Province Wellesley until 1901. His next appointment as Acting Second Colonial Secretary took him to Singapore in 1902 until his return to Penang in 1905 to serve as Acting Second Magistrate and Coroner. After serving as Acting Auditor in 1908 in Penang, he continued his service in various capacities in the Federated Malay States such as Acting Secretary to the Resident of Selangor in 1909 and Acting District Officer Lower Perak in 1910, before returning to Penang as President of the Municipal Commissioners Penang in 1911. He became Acting Resident Councillor of Penang from (26 February – 5 October 1917). Later, he became president of the municipal commissioners of Singapore in 1918. In 1919, he was appointed as joint passage controller of labour for the Federated Malay States and Straits Settlements in 1920; and chairman of European Unemployment Committee in 1921. In 1922, he became British Adviser for the Government of Kedah. He became Acting Resident Councillor of Penang from 10 May to 9 July 1925. In 1927, he acted as officer administering the government and High Commissioner for the Malay States, having been promoted to be Chief Secretary to Government in 1926.

== Governor of Hong Kong ==
On 9 May 1930, Peel was appointed as Governor of Hong Kong. During his tenure, the telephone system in Hong Kong was automated, and the first permanent flight between China and Hong Kong was established. Also, Peel presided over the construction of a Governor's Retreat in Fanling, in the New Territories.

Peel retired in May 1935.

== Personal life ==
Peel was married to Violet Mary Drake, daughter of the late W. D. Laing, by whom he had two sons including the Conservative MP John Peel.

== Places named after him ==
Peel Rise in Hong Kong is a hiking trail connecting Aberdeen Reservoir Road and Peak Road. and Peel Avenue in Penang were named after him. In addition, the Violet Peel Health Centre was named after his wife. The Peel Block of King George V School is named after him. Jalan Peel (Peel Road) in Kuala Lumpur was named after him too.

== Honours ==
Peel was appointed a Knight Commander of the Order of the British Empire (KBE) in the 1928 Birthday Honours, and a Knight Commander of the Order of St Michael and St George (KCMG) in the 1931 Birthday Honours.

Government offices
Preceded by Sir Cecil Clementi	Governor of Hong Kong; 1930 – 1935	Succeeded by Sir Andrew Caldecott
