= Hugh Crawford Smith =

Member of Parliament for Tyneside
- In office 1900–1906
- Preceded by: Jack Pease
- Succeeded by: J. M. Robertson

Personal details
- Born: 1846
- Died: 1907 (aged 60–61)
- Spouse: Hannah Ralston Lockhart
- Relatives: Norman Lockhart Smith (son)
- Occupation: Businessman, politician

Hugh Crawford Smith (1846–1907) was an English businessman and Liberal Unionist MP for Tyneside from 1900 to 1906.

His wife was Hannah Ralston Lockhart, and his son was Norman Lockhart Smith.

== Additional sources ==
- Craig, F.W.S. British Parliamentary Election Results 1885-1918
- Whitaker's Almanack, 1901 to 1906 editions
- Leigh Rayments' Historical list of MPs^{[usurped]}
