= Harry Scott Newlands =

British colonial governor

Harry Scott Newlands (9 February 1884 – 12 March 1933) was the British Chief Commissioner in the Gold Coast (British colony) from 1930 to 1933 and Governor of Barbados from 21 January to 12 March 1933. He died in office.

Government offices
Preceded by Sir William Charles Fleming Robertson	Governor of Barbados; 21 January 1933–12 March 1933	Succeeded by Sir Mark Aitchison Young
