= Edward Stubbs =

British colonial administrator (1876–1947)

Sir Edward Stubbs GCMG FZS JP
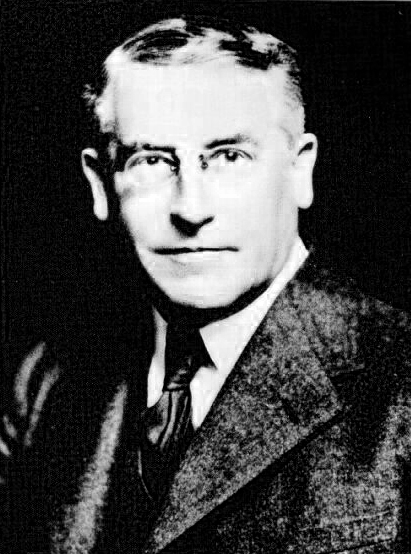
- Stubbs as Governor of Hong Kong

27th Governor of British Ceylon
- In office 23 December 1933 – 30 June 1937
- Monarchs: George V; Edward VIII; George VI
- Preceded by: Francis Graeme Tyrrell (Acting governor)
- Succeeded by: Maxwell MacLagan Wedderburn (Acting governor)

3rd Governor of British Cyprus
- In office 29 October 1932 – 8 November 1933
- Monarch: George V
- Preceded by: Sir Ronald Storrs
- Succeeded by: Sir Herbert Richmond Palmer

Governor of Jamaica
- In office 26 April 1926 – 9 November 1932
- Monarch: George V
- Preceded by: Sir Samuel Herbert Wilson
- Succeeded by: Sir Alexander Ransford Slater

16th Governor of Hong Kong
- In office 30 September 1919 – 1 November 1925
- Monarch: George V
- Colonial Secretary: Sir Claud Severn
- Preceded by: Francis Henry May
- Succeeded by: Cecil Clementi

Acting Governor of British Ceylon
- In office 24 March 1918 – 10 September 1918
- Monarch: George V
- Preceded by: John Anderson
- Succeeded by: William Manning
- In office 4 December 1915 – 15 April 1916
- Monarch: George V
- Preceded by: Robert Chalmers
- Succeeded by: John Anderson
- In office 24 January 1913 – 18 October 1913
- Monarch: George V
- Preceded by: Henry Edward McCallum
- Succeeded by: Robert Chalmers

Personal details
- Born: 13 October 1876
- Died: 7 December 1947 (aged 71)
- Spouse: Marjory Stubbs
- Education: Corpus Christi College, Oxford
- Profession: Colonial administrator

Chinese name
- Chinese: 司徒拔
Transcriptions
Yue: Cantonese
- Jyutping: si1 tou4 bat6

Sir Reginald Edward Stubbs GCMG FZS JP (Chinese: 司徒拔; 13 October 1876 – 7 December 1947) was a British colonial administrator who served as governor of four British territories during his career, including Hong Kong and Ceylon.

== Early life and education ==
Reginald Edward Stubbs was born on 13 October 1876, the son of William Stubbs, a historian and bishop of Chester and Oxford, consecutively. He was educated at Radley and Corpus Christi College, Oxford. He obtained first class honours in Lit. Hum. in 1899.

== Early Colonial Services ==
He entered Colonial Office in 1900 as a second-class clerk, eventually serving as acting first class clerk from 1907 to 1910, when he became a permanent 1st class clerk. In that same year, Stubbs was sent on a special mission to Malay Peninsula and Hong Kong. He was a member of West African Lands Committee in 1912, and became a colonial secretary of Ceylon in from 1913 to 1919.

== Governor of Hong Kong ==
He was appointed Hong Kong Governor in 1919, a position he served until 1925.

During Stubbs's tenure, strikes were frequent, including ones that were very damaging to the Hong Kong economy, such as the Seamen's strike of 1922 and the Canton-Hong Kong strike that began in 1925.

Stubbs engaged in cordial talks with Sun Yat-sen and his supporters in Hong Kong prior to Sun's triumphal return to Canton in February 1923.

There followed, in 1925, the general strike that involved workers in Hong Kong and Canton, China. The strikers demanded the annulment of the "unequal treaties" (Treaty of Nanking, Treaty of Peking, and New Territories land lease agreement, which, altogether, allowed British control of Hong Kong). The strikers also demanded better treatment of Chinese labourers in Hong Kong.

At first, Stubbs tried to suppress the strikers with legal and forceful means. He regarded the strike as a Bolshevik plot headed by Dr. Sun Yat-sen to overthrow the colonial government, without any attention to the pressing economic grievances at stake. He banned the Chinese Seamen's Union, the organizer of the strike and banned Dr. Sun and the Soviet military and political advisers in Canton from entering the colony due to Sun's anti-colonial remarks. The efforts backfired and caused an exodus of more than 100,000 Chinese labourers to China.

Stubbs took a conservative stance, in line with his Chinese elite advisors, on the issue of mui-tsai, a form of child slavery then prevalent in the colony. He was criticized by London for acquiescence.

Stubbs rejected repeated calls among the local European community for direct election of the Legislative Council, fearing the exclusion of local Chinese from similar rights may lead to unrest.

Both Stubbs and his Colonial Secretary Claud Severn were replaced in 1925, having failed to quell the disorder and leaving behind a seriously damaged Hong Kong economy. British Consul General in Canton James Jamieson criticised their leadership, seeing them as out of touch and out of date, unable to converse in Chinese and ignorant of republican China.

Stubbs received an M.A. degree during his tenure, in 1920.

== Jamaica and Cyprus ==
After his stormy tenure as Governor of Hong Kong, Stubbs was made Captain-General and Governor-in-Chief of Jamaica a year later, in 1926. He would hold this position until 1932, when he was appointed Governor and Commander-in-Chief of Cyprus. He would serve in this position until 1933.

== Governorship of Ceylon ==
In 1933 Stubbs was appointed to his last position in the Colonial Service: Governor and Commander-in-Chief of Ceylon (Sri Lanka).

=== Bracegirdle affair ===
In 1937, he was prevailed upon by the White planters to become involved in an illegal attempt to deport Mark Anthony Bracegirdle, an Australian planter who had gone over to the side of the workers and joined the Lanka Sama Samaja Party (LSSP). Bracegirdle was served with the order of deportation on 22 April and given 48 hours to leave, but he defied the order, going into hiding instead. The Colonial Government began a man-hunt, but was unsuccessful. The LSSP started a campaign to defend him. At that year's May Day rally at Price Park, Colombo placards declaring 'We want Bracegirdle – Deport Stubbs' were displayed, and a resolution was passed condemning Stubbs, demanding his removal and the withdrawal of the deportation order.

On 5 May, in the State Council, the LSSP members Dr N. M. Perera and Philip Gunawardena moved a vote of censure on the Governor for having ordered the deportation of Bracegirdle without the advice of the acting Home Minister. Even the Board of Ministers had started feeling the heat of public opinion and the vote was passed by 34 votes to 7.

On the same day there was a 50,000-strong rally at Galle Face Green, which was addressed by Dr N. M. Perera, Philip Gunawardena, and S. W. R. D. Bandaranaike, condemning Stubbs. Bracegirdle made a dramatic appearance on the platform at this rally, but the police were powerless to arrest him. They managed to arrest him a couple of days later, but a writ of habeas corpus was served and the case was called before a bench of three Supreme Court judges presided over by Chief Justice Sir Sidney Abrahams. The brilliant H. V. Perera, the county's leading civil lawyer, volunteered his services free on behalf of Bracegirdle; he was made a King's Counsel (KC) on the day that Bracegirdle appeared in court. On 18 May order was made that he could not be deported for exercising his right to free speech, and Bracegirdle was a free man.

Stubbs retired shortly afterwards.

== Retirement ==
A year after his retirement, Stubbs became the vice-chairman of West India Royal Commission (until 1939) and Chairman of Northern Division Appellate Tribunal for Conscientious Objectors from 1941 to 1947.

== Personal life ==
Stubbs married Marjory Stubbs in 1909. The couple had two sons and one daughter. He died on 7 December 1947.

== Honours ==
- CMG, 1914
- KCMG, 1919
- GCMG, 1928 Birthday Honours
- Honorary Fellow, Corpus Christi College, 1926
- Hon. LL.D., University of Hong Kong, 1926

== Recognition ==
- Stubbs Road in the eastern Mid-Levels on Hong Kong Island was named after him.
- The Sri Lankan boxing award, the Stubbs Shield, is named after him.

== See also ==
- History of Hong Kong
- Sri Lanka Independence Struggle

Government offices
| Preceded by Henry Edward McCallum | Acting; Governor of Ceylon; 1913 | Succeeded by Robert Chalmers |
| Preceded by Robert Chalmers | Acting; Governor of Ceylon; 1915–1916 | Succeeded by John Anderson |
| Preceded by John Anderson | Acting; Governor of Ceylon; 1918 | Succeeded by William Manning |
| Preceded by Claud Severn, Acting Administrator | Governor of Hong Kong; 1919–1925 | Succeeded by Cecil Clementi |
| Preceded by Brig. Sir Samuel Herbert Wilson | Governor of Jamaica; 1926–1932 | Succeeded by Sir Alexander Ransford Slater |
| Preceded by Sir Ronald Storrs | Governor of Cyprus; 1932–1933 | Succeeded by Sir Herbert Richmond Palmer |
| Preceded by Francis Graeme Tyrrell acting governor | Governor of Ceylon; 1933–1937 | Succeeded by Maxwell MacLagan Wedderburn acting governor |
