= Tyneside (constituency) =

Parliamentary constituency in the United Kingdom, 1885–1918

- Former county constituency for the House of Commons
- County: Northumberland

1885–1918
- Seats: One
- Created from: South Northumberland
- Replaced by: Wallsend, Newcastle upon Tyne East, Newcastle upon Tyne West, Wansbeck

Tyneside was a parliamentary constituency in the Tyneside area of north-east England, which returned one Member of Parliament (MP) to the House of Commons of the Parliament of the United Kingdom, elected by the first-past-the-post voting system.

The constituency was created by the Redistribution of Seats Act 1885 for the 1885 general election as one of four single-member Divisions of the county of Northumberland, and abolished for the 1918 general election.

== Boundaries ==
The contents of the county division, as defined by the Redistribution of Seats Act 1885, were:

The Sessional Division of Castle West (part), the Municipal Boroughs of Newcastle-upon-Tyne, and Tynemouth, and the Parish of Wallsend.

NB included non-resident freeholders in the parliamentary boroughs of Newcastle upon Tyne and Tynemouth.

=== Abolition ===
On abolition in 1918, the contents of the seat were distributed as follows:

- the majority of the electorate, comprising the municipal borough of Wallsend and the urban districts of Gosforth, Longbenton and Weetslade formed the new Parliamentary Borough of Wallsend;
- the former urban districts of Walker, and Benwell and Fenham which had been abolished in 1904 and absorbed into the County Borough of Newcastle upon Tyne were included in Newcastle upon Tyne East and West respectively; and
- the urban district of Newburn and surrounding rural areas were transferred to Wansbeck.

== Members of Parliament ==
Election	Member	Party	Notes
1885	Albert Grey	Liberal	Elected as a Liberal, but joined the Liberal Unionists when the party split in 1886
1886	Wentworth Beaumont	Liberal	
1892	Jack Pease	Liberal	One of the Pease family of Darlington
1900	Hugh Crawford Smith	Liberal Unionist	
1906	J. M. Robertson	Liberal	Journalist, advocate of rationalism and secularism
1918	constituency abolished		

== Elections ==
=== Elections in the 1880s ===
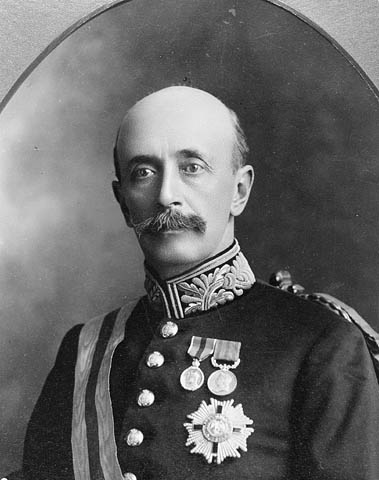
Albert Grey

General election 1885: Tyneside
Party	Candidate	Votes	%	±%
Liberal	Albert Grey	5,782	62.7	
Conservative	Gainsford Bruce	3,440	37.3	
Majority		2,342	25.4	
Turnout		9,222	77.8	
Registered electors		11,852		
Liberal win (new seat)				

General election 1886: Tyneside
Party	Candidate	Votes	%	±%
Liberal	Wentworth Beaumont	4,112	50.8	−11.9
Liberal Unionist	Albert Grey	3,990	49.2	+11.9
Majority		122	1.6	−23.8
Turnout		8,102	68.4	−9.4
Registered electors		11,852		
Liberal hold		Swing	−11.9	

=== Elections in the 1890s ===
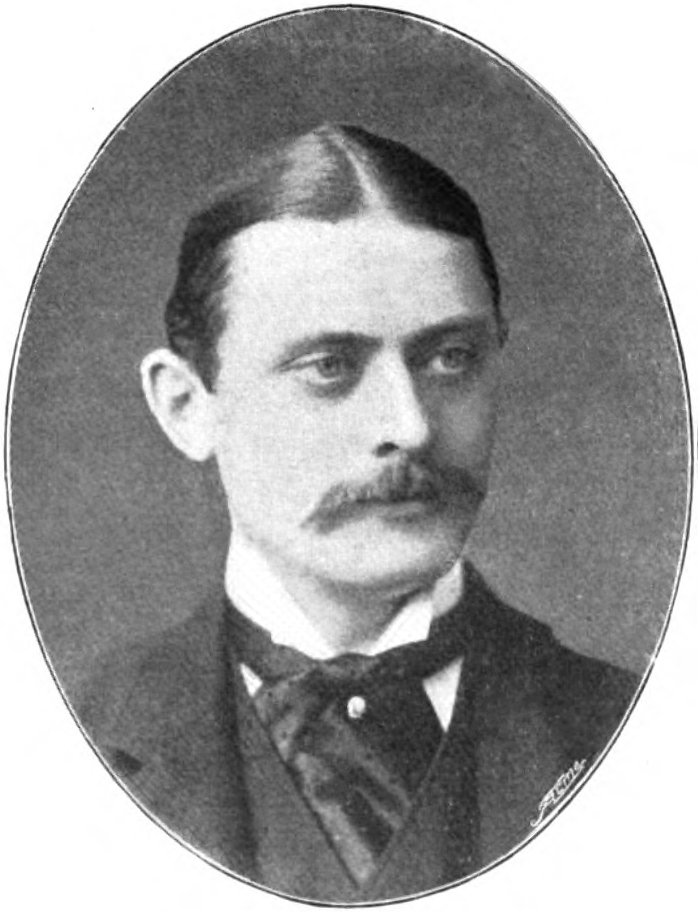
Joseph Pease

General election 1892: Tyneside
Party	Candidate	Votes	%	±%
Liberal	Jack Pease	5,468	52.1	+1.3
Liberal Unionist	Arnold White	5,018	47.9	−1.3
Majority		450	4.2	+2.6
Turnout		10,486	76.4	+8.0
Registered electors		13,727		
Liberal hold		Swing	+1.3	

General election 1895: Tyneside
Party	Candidate	Votes	%	±%
Liberal	Jack Pease	6,066	51.9	−0.2
Liberal Unionist	Arnold White	5,631	48.1	+0.2
Majority		435	3.8	−0.4
Turnout		11,697	78.3	+1.9
Registered electors		14,932		
Liberal hold		Swing	-0.2	

=== Elections in the 1900s ===
General election 1900: Tyneside
Party	Candidate	Votes	%	±%
Liberal Unionist	Hugh Crawford Smith	7,093	51.3	+3.2
Liberal	Jack Pease	6,730	48.7	−3.2
Majority		363	2.6	N/A
Turnout		13,823	74.9	−3.4
Registered electors		18,460		
Liberal Unionist gain from Liberal		Swing	+3.2	

J. M. Robertson

General election 1906: Tyneside
Party	Candidate	Votes	%	±%
Liberal	J. M. Robertson	11,496	62.5	+13.8
Conservative	James Knott	6,885	37.5	−13.8
Majority		4,611	25.0	N/A
Turnout		18,381	79.3	+4.4
Registered electors		23,167		
Liberal gain from Liberal Unionist		Swing	+13.8	

=== Elections in the 1910s ===
General election January 1910: Tyneside
Party	Candidate	Votes	%	±%
Liberal	J. M. Robertson	13,158	62.8	+0.3
Conservative	Alfred Cochrane	7,807	37.2	−0.3
Majority		5,351	25.6	+0.6
Turnout		20,965	81.5	+2.2
Registered electors		25,711		
Liberal hold		Swing	+0.3	

General election December 1910: Tyneside
Party	Candidate	Votes	%	±%
Liberal	J. M. Robertson	11,693	63.0	+0.2
Conservative	Helenus Macaulay Robertson	6,857	37.0	−0.2
Majority		4,836	26.0	+0.4
Turnout		18,550	72.1	−9.4
Registered electors		25,711		
Liberal hold		Swing	+0.2	

General Election 1914–15:

Another General Election was required to take place before the end of 1915. The political parties had been making preparations for an election to take place and by July 1914, the following candidates had been selected;

- Liberal: J. M. Robertson
- Unionist:

== See also ==
- History of parliamentary constituencies and boundaries in Northumberland
