= Hilary Blood =

British colonial administrator and governor (1893–1967)

Sir Hilary Blood GBE KCMG
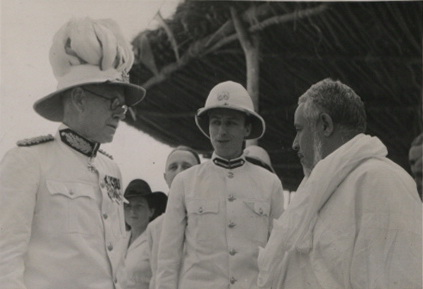
- Blood (left) in 1944

Governor of Mauritius
- In office 26 September 1949 – 11 January 1954
- Monarchs: George VI; Elizabeth II
- Preceded by: James Harford (Acting)
- Succeeded by: Robert Newton (Acting)

Governor of Barbados
- In office 5 February 1947 – 1949
- Monarch: George VI
- Preceded by: Grattan Bushe
- Succeeded by: Alfred Savage

Governor of the Gambia
- In office 23 March 1942 – 29 March 1947
- Monarch: George VI
- Preceded by: Thomas Southorn
- Succeeded by: Andrew Barkworth Wright

Governor of Grenada
- In office 1930–1935
- Monarch: George V
- Preceded by: Herbert Ferguson
- Succeeded by: William Leslie Heape

Personal details
- Born: 28 May 1893 Kilmarnock, Scotland
- Died: 20 June 1967 (aged 74) Kent, England
- Spouse: Alison Farie Anderson (m. 1919)
- Children: 3
- Parents: Alban Francis Blood (father); Adelaide Therese Feldtmann (mother)
- Education: Irvine Royal Academy
- Alma mater: University of Glasgow
- Military career
- Allegiance: United Kingdom
- Branch: British Army
- Service years: 1914–1918
- Rank: Captain
- Unit: 4th Royal Scots Fusiliers
- Conflicts: World War I; Gallipoli Campaign

Sir Hilary Rudolph Robert Blood GBE KCMG (28 May 1893 – 20 June 1967) was a British colonial administrator and governor. He served as the Governor of the Gambia from 1942 to 1947, the Governor of Barbados from 1947 to 1949, and the Governor of Mauritius from 1949 to 1954.

== Early life and education ==
Blood was born in 1893, the son of Alban Francis Blood and his wife Adelaide Therese Feldtmann, in Kilmarnock. His father was the rector of Holy Trinity Church in Kilmarnock. Blood grew up at the parsonage and attended Irvine Royal Academy. Blood sat the bursary competition of the University of Glasgow and finished in the top 50. He matriculated with an arts degree in 1911, taking distinction in Latin, Hellenistic Greek, and Moral Philosophy. He failed Geography, and re-sat it to graduate with an MA in 1914.

Blood served with the 4th Royal Scots Fusiliers during World War I, where he also saw action in the military campaign on the Gallipoli peninsula. He achieved the rank of Captain. He was wounded in Gallipoli and afterwards walked with a limp.

== Colonial service ==
Blood initially wanted to study for the Episcopalian ministry but changed his mind and in 1920 he entered the Ceylon Civil Service. He served in Ceylon between 1920 and 1930 before being appointed as Colonial Secretary of Grenada in 1930, and then Colonial Secretary of Sierra Leone in 1934. In 1942, Blood became Governor of the Gambia, the first of three governorships. His administration was responsible for drawing up plans of how the Colonial Development and Welfare Act funds were to be spent. During his time, the modernization of the Bathurst water system, the establishment of a sewage system, paved streets, and improvements to the port all took place. Blood also established the Bathurst Town Council in 1946, introducing a new constitution for direct elections later that year.

He then served as Governor of Barbados from 1947 to 1949, and Governor of Mauritius from 1949 to 1954. His experience equipped him with an understanding of the problems British territories faced when seeking self-government. His expertise was called on as a constitutional commissioner to help frame governments in British Honduras, Zanzibar, and Malta. He also wrote a number of articles and reviews in the academic journal African Affairs. In 1944, he was knighted, and in the same year he received an honorary doctor of laws from Glasgow University.

== Later life ==
Blood remained active on retirement, and served as chairman of the Royal Society of Arts from 1963 to 1965.

== Personal life ==
In 1919, he married Alison Farie Anderson, the daughter of William Boyd Anderson, a solicitor, and Jacobina Croll. They had a son and two daughters.

Government offices
Preceded by Sir Donald Mackenzie-Kennedy	Governor of Mauritius; 1949–1954	Succeeded by Sir Robert Scott
