= Claud Severn =

British colonial administrator (1869–1933)

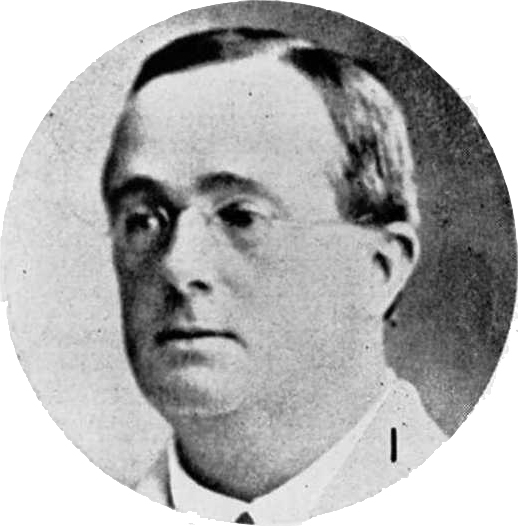

Sir Claud Severn KBE CMG (Chinese Translated Name: 施勳) (1869–1933) was a British colonial administrator. Severn joined the colonial civil service in British Malaya in 1894 and worked under the Governor of the Straits Settlements. In 1912, he became Colonial Secretary of Hong Kong and remained in the post until 1925. During this period, Severn governed Hong Kong twice as acting administrator during transition periods between Governors.

== Early life ==
Sir Claud Severn was born on 9 September 1869 in Adelaide, South Australia, to Walter Severn (1830－1904) (at one time British Consul in Rome) and Mary Dalrymple Fergusson (1845-1916). His mother was the daughter of Sir Charles Dalrymple Fergusson, 5th Baronet.

Severn went to St Peter's College, Adelaide and studied Latin and chemistry at the University of Adelaide. He later graduated from Selwyn College, Cambridge with a BA in 1890 and MA in 1913.

== Colonial service ==
Having joined the Foreign Service in 1891 as a temporary library clerk, Severn was appointed, in 1894, private secretary to Sir Charles B H Mitchell, then Governor of the Straits Settlements. After a period of 17 years in the colonial administration of the Federated Malay States including four years as private secretary to Governor Sir John Anderson, he was appointed Colonial Secretary in Hong Kong, leading the administration under Governor Sir Frederick Lugard. He was acting governor of Hong Kong for just over a year during a transition between governors from 1918 to 1919. It was 1918 when he entertained the visiting George Morrison, the highly influential Political Advisor to the President of the Chinese Republic, who related that the appointment of the "Buffoon of Hong Kong" was "one of the jokes of our time".

In 1920, at 50, he married Margaret Annie Bullock, the daughter of Thomas Lowndes Bullock who from 1899 was Professor of Chinese at the University of Oxford, and they had two sons and a daughter.

Both Severn and Governor Sir Reginald Stubbs retired in 1925, victims of the general strike which all but destroyed Hong Kong that year and for which they were criticised by James Jamieson, British Consul General in Canton. Jamieson saw them as out of touch and out of date, unable to converse in Chinese and ignorant of republican China.

== Later life ==
After his service in Hong Kong, Severn departed for Britain and died at the Old Rectory, Ewelme, near Oxford, on 8 April 1933.

== Memory ==
Severn Road, which is located on Mount Gough in Hong Kong, was named after him.

== Honours ==
- CMG 1917
- KBE 1923

Government offices
Preceded by Warren Delabere Barnes	Colonial Secretary of Hong Kong; 1912 - 1925	Succeeded by Sir Wilfrid Thomas Southorn
Preceded by Frederick, Lord Lugard	Acting Administrator of Hong Kong; March–July 1912	Succeeded by Sir Francis Henry May
Preceded by Sir Francis Henry May	Acting Administrator of Hong Kong; September 1918-September 1919	Succeeded by Sir Reginald Edward Stubbs
