= Governor of Hong Kong =

1843–1997 British Crown representative

- Coat of arms of Hong Kong (1959–1997)

- Flag of the governor of Hong Kong (1959–1997)

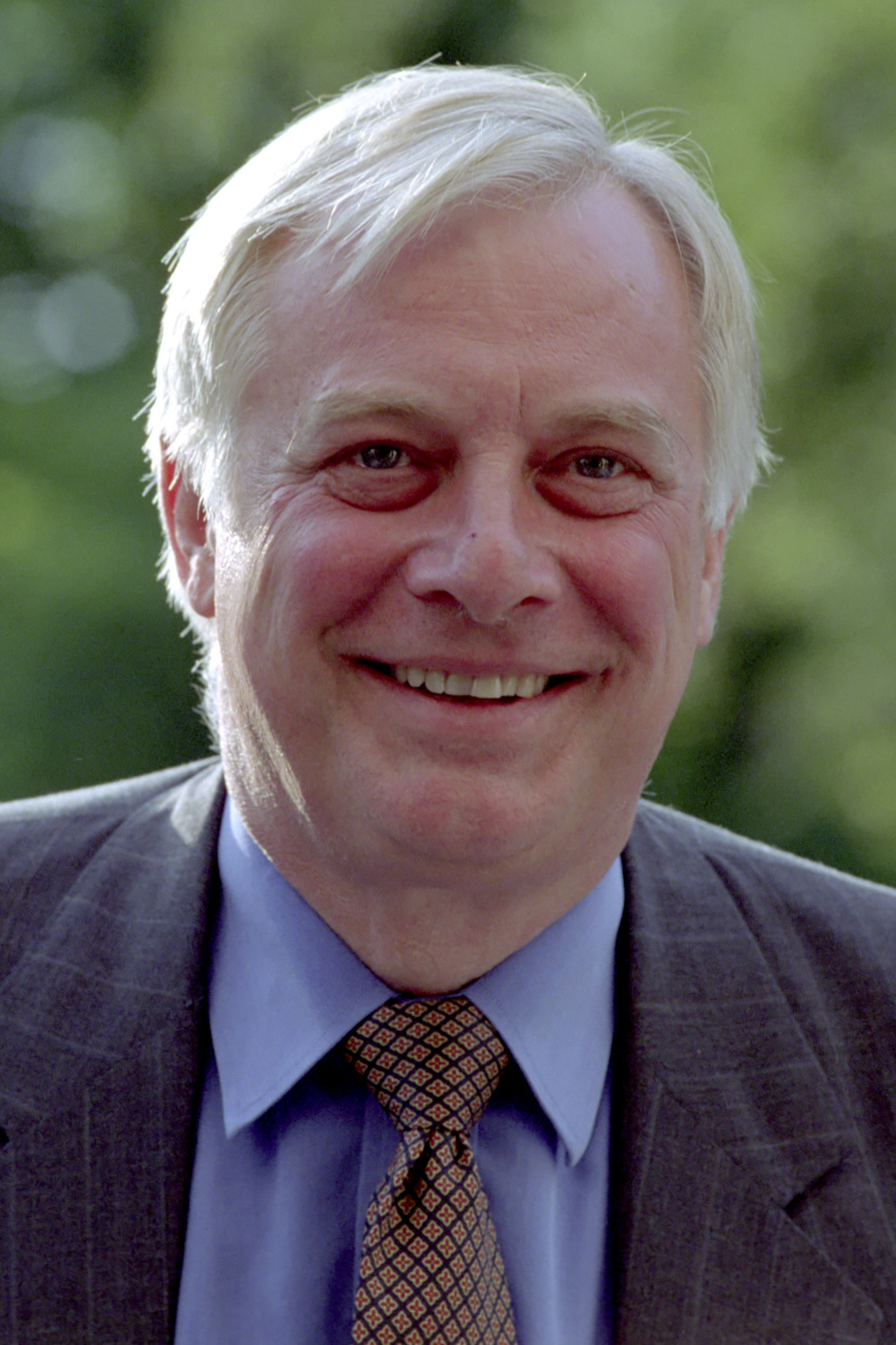
- Last in office Chris Patten; 9 July 1992 – 30 June 1997
- Style: His Excellency
- Residence: Government House, Hong Kong
- Appointer: Monarch of the United Kingdom
- Term length: At Her Majesty's pleasure (typically 5 years); Renewable
- Formation: 26 June 1843; 183 years ago
- First holder: Sir Henry Pottinger
- Final holder: Chris Patten
- Abolished: 30 June 1997; 29 years ago
- Salary: HK$3,036,000 annually (1997)

Governor of Hong Kong
- Traditional Chinese: 香港總督
- Simplified Chinese: 香港总督
- Cantonese Yale: Hēunggóng Júngdūk
Transcriptions
Standard Mandarin
- Hanyu Pinyin: Xiānggǎng Zǒngdū
- Wade–Giles: Hsiang1-kang3 Tsung3-tu1
Yue: Cantonese
- Yale Romanization: Hēunggóng Júngdūk
- Jyutping: Hoeng1gong2 Zung2duk1

Abbreviation
- Chinese: 港督
- Cantonese Yale: Góngdūk
Transcriptions
Standard Mandarin
- Hanyu Pinyin: Gǎngdū
- Wade–Giles: Kang3-tu1
Yue: Cantonese
- Yale Romanization: Góngdūk
- Jyutping: Gong2duk1

The governor of Hong Kong was the representative of the British Crown in Hong Kong from 1843 to 1997. In this capacity, the governor was president of the Executive Council and commander-in-chief of the British Forces Overseas Hong Kong. The governor's roles were defined in the Hong Kong Letters Patent and Royal Instructions. Upon the end of British rule and the handover of Hong Kong to China in 1997, most of the civil functions of this office went to the chief executive of Hong Kong, and military functions went to the commander of the People's Liberation Army Hong Kong Garrison.

== Powers and functions ==
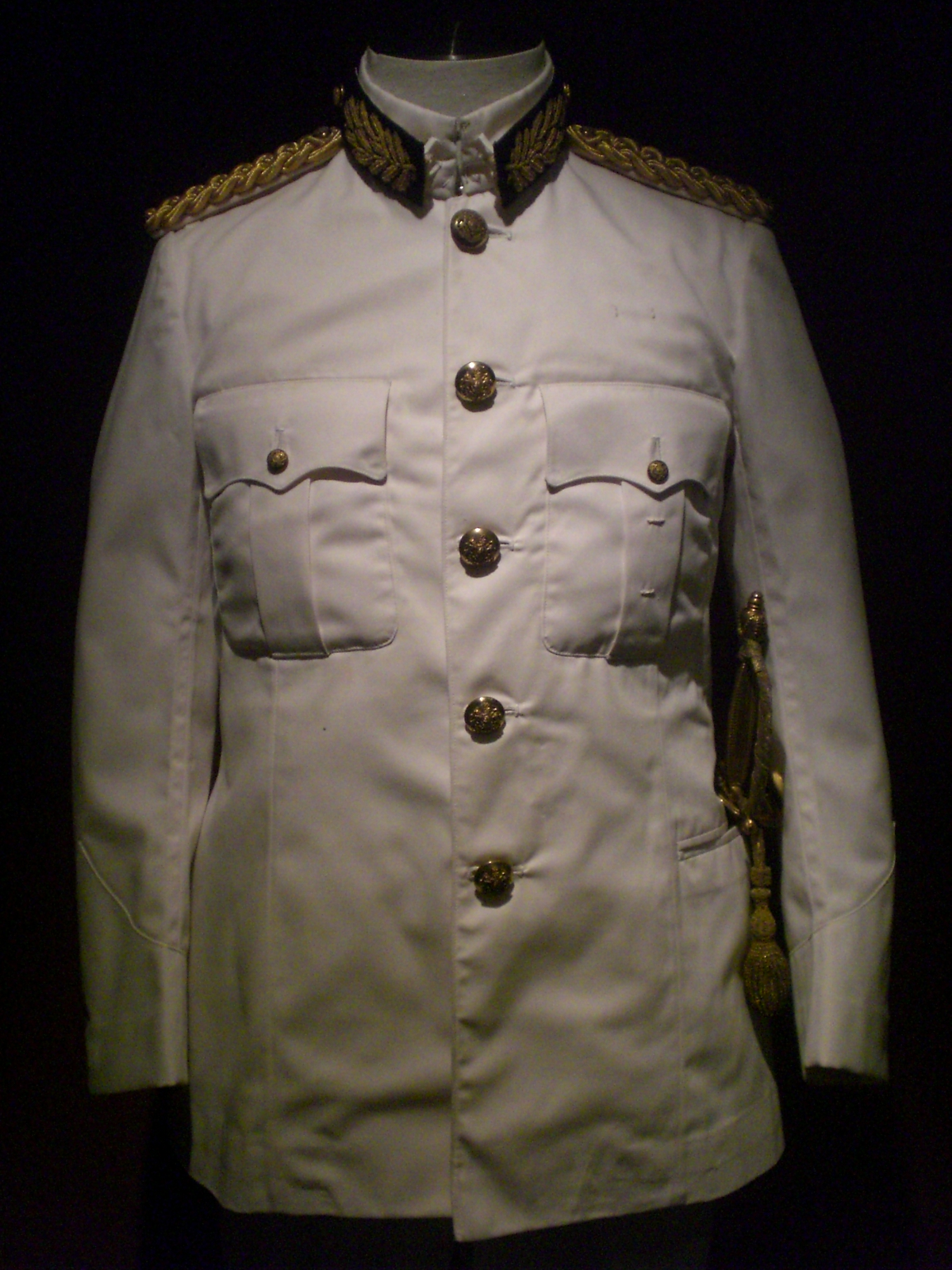
White tropical dress (colonial service, 1st class) of the Gubernatorial uniform which belonged to Sir Edward Youde, worn by him on the day he was sworn in as Governor and worn by him at numerous official ceremonies during his tenure, Hong Kong Museum of History.

Authorities and duties of the governor were defined in the Hong Kong Letters Patent and Royal Instructions in 1843. The governor, appointed by the British monarch (on the advice of the Foreign Secretary), exercised the executive branch of the government of Hong Kong throughout British sovereignty and, with the exception of a brief experiment after World War II, no serious attempt was made to introduce representative government, until the final years of British rule.

The governor of Hong Kong chaired the colonial cabinet, the Executive Council (ExCo), and, until 1993, was also the president of the Legislative Council. The governor appointed most, if not all, of the members of the colony's legislature (known colloquially as LegCo), which was largely an advisory body until the first indirect election to LegCo was held in 1985. Initially, both councils were dominated by British expatriates, but this progressively gave way to local Hong Kong Chinese appointees in later years. Historically, the governors of Hong Kong were either professional diplomats or senior colonial officials, except for the last governor, Chris Patten, who was a career politician. In December 1996, the governor's salary was HK$3,036,000 per annum, tax-free. It was fixed at 125% of the chief secretary's salary.

In the absence of the governor, the chief secretary immediately became the acting governor of the colony. The chief secretaries were historically drawn from the Colonial Office or British military. One Royal Navy Vice Admiral served as administrator after World War II. Four Japanese military officers (three Army officers and one naval vice admiral) served as administrators during the Japanese occupation of Hong Kong in World War II.

== Entitlements and benefits ==
=== Transport ===
The governor of Hong Kong used a Daimler DS420 for day to day transport and a Rolls-Royce Phantom V landaulet for ceremonial occasions. Both vehicles were removed by the Royal Navy immediately following the handover to China on 1 July 1997.

=== Residences ===
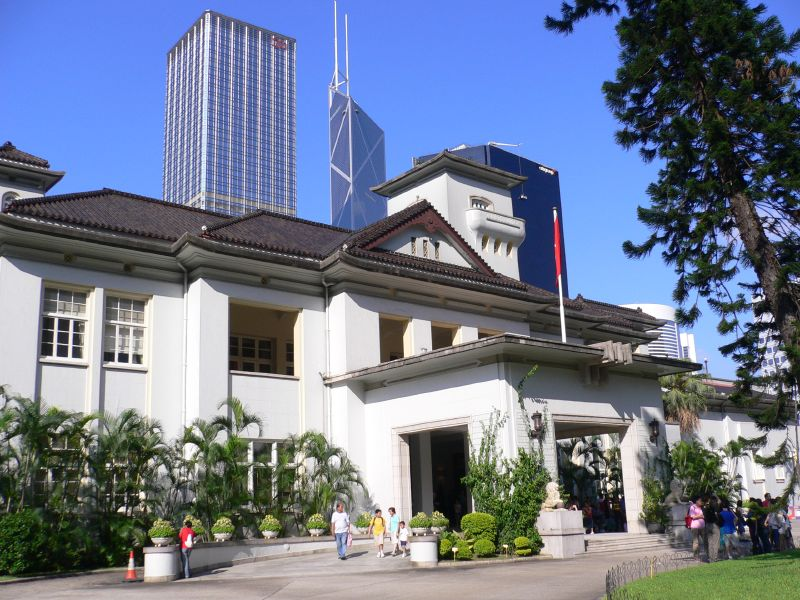
Government House was the official residence of the governor from 1855 to 1997.

- The first governor, Sir Henry Pottinger, 1st Bt., resided at the site of the now Former French Mission Building from 1843 to 1846. It was used as the home of the Provisional Government after Japanese surrender from 1945 to 1946. The building housed the Hong Kong Court of Final Appeal from the transfer of sovereignty to 6 September 2015. His successor, Sir John Davis, 1st Bt., also lived there before moving to Caine Road.
- Since the 4th governor, Sir John Bowring, the governors resided at Government House, excluding the period from 1941 to 1946.
- From 1941 to 1945 the Commandant of Japanese Forces as Military Governor of Hong Kong occupied Flagstaff House as their residence. The residence was returned to the Commander of British Forces following the end of World War II.

== List of governors ==
=== British administrators and governors (1841–1941) ===
No.	Portrait	Name (Birth–Death)	Term of office			Origin	Background	Ref
No.	Portrait	Name (Birth–Death)	Took office	Left office	Duration	Origin	Background	Ref
		Sir Charles Elliot 義律 (1801–1875); Administrator	26 January 1841	12 August 1841	198 days	Dresden, Saxony	Chief Superintendent of British Trade in China	
		Alexander Robert Johnston 莊士敦 (1812–1888); Acting Administrator	22 June 1841	1 February 1842	224 days	Colombo, Ceylon	Deputy Superintendent of British Trade in China	
		Alexander Robert Johnston 莊士敦 (1812–1888); Acting Administrator	13 June 1842	2 December 1842	172 days	Colombo, Ceylon	Deputy Superintendent of British Trade in China	
		Sir Henry Pottinger 砵甸乍 (1789–1856); Administrator	12 August 1841	26 June 1843	1 year, 318 days	Ballymacarrett, Ireland	Lieutenant-General, East India Company	
1		Sir Henry Pottinger 砵甸乍 (1789–1856)	26 June 1843	8 May 1844	317 days	Ballymacarrett, Ireland	Lieutenant-General	
2		Sir John Francis Davis 戴維斯 (1795–1890)	8 May 1844	21 March 1848	3 years, 315 days	London, England	Chief Superintendent of British Trade in China	
3		Sir George Bonham 文咸 (1803–1863)	21 March 1848	13 April 1854	6 years, 23 days	London, England	East India Company	
4		Sir John Bowring 寶靈 (1792–1872)	13 April 1854	2 May 1859	5 years, 19 days	Exeter, England	Member of Parliament (MP)	
		William Caine 堅 (1799–1871); Acting Governor	2 May 1859	9 September 1859	130 days	Maynooth, Ireland	Colonial Secretary	
5		Sir Hercules Robinson 羅士敏 (1824–1897)	9 September 1859	15 March 1865	5 years, 187 days	Westmeath, Ireland	Colonial administrator	
		William Thomas Mercer 孖沙 (1821–1879); Acting Governor	15 March 1865	12 March 1866	362 days	London, England	Colonial Secretary	
6		Sir Richard Graves MacDonnell 麥當奴 (1814–1881)	12 March 1866	11 April 1872	6 years, 30 days	Dublin, Ireland	Colonial administrator	
		Henry Wase Whitfield 威非路 (1814–1877); Lieutenant-Governor	11 April 1872	16 April 1872	5 days	England	Commander and lieutenant governor	
7		Sir Arthur Kennedy 堅尼地 (1809–1883)	16 April 1872	1 March 1877	4 years, 319 days	County Down, Ireland	Colonial administrator	
		John Gardiner Austin 柯士甸 (1811–1900); Administrator	1 March 1877	23 April 1877	53 days	Lowlands Plantation, Demerara	Colonial administrator	
8		Sir John Pope Hennessy 軒尼詩 (1834–1891)	23 April 1877	7 March 1882	4 years, 318 days	County Cork, Ireland	Colonial administrator	
		Malcolm Struan Tonnochy 杜老誌 (1841–1882); Administrator	7 March 1882	28 March 1882	21 days	Uttar Pradesh, Bengal, India	Colonial administrator	
		Sir William Henry Marsh 馬師 (1827–1906); Administrator	28 March 1882	30 March 1883	1 year, 2 days	England	Colonial administrator	
9		Sir George Bowen 寶雲 (1821–1899)	30 March 1883	21 December 1885	2 years, 266 days	County Donegal, Ireland	Colonial administrator	
		Sir William Henry Marsh 馬殊 (1827–1906); Officer Administrating the Government	21 December 1885	25 April 1887	1 year, 125 days	England	Colonial administrator	
		William Gordon Cameron 金馬倫 (1827–1913); Officer Administering the Government	25 April 1887	6 October 1887	164 days	France	Commander and lieutenant governor, British Army	
10		Sir William Des Vœux 德輔 (1834–1909)	6 October 1887	7 May 1891	3 years, 213 days	Baden-Baden, German Confederation	Colonial administrator	
		Sir George Digby Barker 白加 (1833–1914); Officer Administering the Government	7 May 1891	10 December 1891	217 days	Clare, England	Commander and lieutenant governor, British Army	
11		Sir William Robinson 羅便臣 (1836–1912)	10 December 1891	1 February 1898	6 years, 53 days	Wetherden, England	Colonial administrator	
		Sir Wilsone Black 布力 (1837–1909); Officer Administering the Government	1 February 1898	25 November 1898	297 days	Glasgow, Scotland	Commander and lieutenant governor	
12		Sir Henry Arthur Blake 卜力 (1840–1918)	25 November 1898	21 November 1903	4 years, 361 days	Limerick, Ireland	Colonial administrator	
		Sir Francis Henry May 梅含理 (1860–1922); Officer Administering the Government	21 November 1903	29 July 1904	251 days	Dublin, Ireland	Colonial Secretary	
13		Sir Matthew Nathan 彌敦 (1862–1939)	29 July 1904	20 April 1907	2 years, 265 days	London, England	Colonial administrator	
		Sir Francis Henry May 梅含理 (1860–1922); Officer Administering the Government	20 April 1907	29 July 1907	100 days	Dublin, Ireland	Colonial Secretary	
14		Sir Frederick Lugard 盧吉 (1858–1945)	29 July 1907	16 March 1912	4 years, 231 days	Madras, India	Colonial administrator	
		Claud Severn 施勳 (1869–1933); Officer Administering the Government	16 March 1912	4 July 1912	110 days	Adelaide, South Australia	Colonial administrator	
15		Sir Francis Henry May 梅含理 (1860–1922)	4 July 1912	12 September 1918	6 years, 70 days	Dublin, Ireland	Colonial Secretary	
		Claud Severn 施勳 (1869–1933); Officer Administering the Government	12 September 1918	30 September 1919	1 year, 18 days	Adelaide, South Australia	Colonial administrator	
16		Sir Reginald Edward Stubbs 司徒拔 (1876–1947)	30 September 1919	31 October 1925	6 years, 31 days	Oxford, England	Colonial administrator	
17		Sir Cecil Clementi 金文泰 (1875–1947)	1 November 1925	1 February 1930	4 years, 92 days	Cawnpore, India	Colonial administrator	
		Thomas Southorn 修頓 (1879–1957); Officer Administering the Government	1 February 1930	9 May 1930	97 days	Durham, England	Colonial Secretary	
18		Sir William Peel 貝璐 (1875–1945)	9 May 1930	17 May 1935	5 years, 8 days	Hexham, England	Colonial administrator	
		Thomas Southorn 修頓 (1879–1957); Officer Administering the Government	17 May 1935	13 September 1935	119 days	Leamington Spa, England	Colonial Secretary	
		Norman Lockhart Smith 史美 (1887–1968); Officer Administering the Government	13 September 1935	1 November 1935	49 days	Durham, England	Colonial administrator	
		Thomas Southorn 修頓 (1879–1957); Officer Administering the Government	1 November 1935	12 December 1935	41 days	Leamington Spa, England	Colonial Secretary	
19		Sir Andrew Caldecott 郝德傑 (1884–1951)	12 December 1935	16 April 1937	1 year, 125 days	Kent, England	Colonial administrator	
		Norman Lockhart Smith 史美 (1887–1968); Officer Administering the Government	16 April 1937	28 October 1937	195 days	Durham, England	Colonial Secretary	
20		Sir Geoffry Northcote 羅富國 (1881–1948)	28 October 1937	6 September 1941	3 years, 313 days	London, England	Colonial administrator	
		Norman Lockhart Smith 史美 (1887–1968); Officer Administering the Government	6 September 1941	10 September 1941	4 days	Durham, England	Colonial Secretary	
21		Sir Mark Aitchison Young 楊慕琦 (1886–1974)	10 September 1941	25 December 1941	106 days	India	Colonial administrator	

=== Japanese occupation (1941–1945) ===
No.	Portrait	Name (Birth–Death)	Term of office			Origin	Background	Ref
No.	Portrait	Name (Birth–Death)	Took office	Left office	Duration	Origin	Background	Ref
		Takashi Sakai 酒井隆 (1887–1946); Administrator	25 December 1941	20 February 1942	57 days	Kamo, Hiroshima	Lieutenant general	
		Masaichi Niimi 新見政一 (1887–1993); Administrator	25 December 1941	20 February 1942	57 days	Hiroshima, Hiroshima	Vice admiral	
1		Rensuke Isogai 磯谷廉介 (1886–1967)	20 February 1942	24 December 1944	2 years, 308 days	Tanba, Hyōgo	Lieutenant general	
2		Hisakazu Tanaka 田中久一 (1889–1947)	1 February 1945	16 August 1945	196 days	Himeji, Hyōgo	Lieutenant general	

=== British administrators and governors (1945–1997) ===
No.	Portrait	Name (Birth–Death)	Term of office			Origin	Background	Ref
No.	Portrait	Name (Birth–Death)	Took office	Left office	Duration	Origin	Background	Ref
		Sir Franklin Charles Gimson 詹遜 (1890–1975); Provisional Governor	28 August 1945	30 August 1945	2 days	Leicestershire, England	Colonial Secretary	
		Sir Cecil Harcourt 夏愨 (1892–1959); Military administration	1 September 1945	1 May 1946	242 days	London, England	Admiral (Royal Navy)	
21		Sir Mark Aitchison Young 楊慕琦 (1886–1974)	1 May 1946	17 May 1947	1 year, 16 days	India	Colonial administrator	
		David Mercer MacDougall 麥道高 (1904–1991); Administrator	17 May 1947	25 July 1947	69 days	Perth, Scotland	Colonial Secretary	
22		Sir Alexander Grantham 葛量洪 (1899–1978)	25 July 1947	31 December 1957	10 years, 159 days	London, England	Colonial administrator	
		Edgeworth Beresford David 戴維德 (1908–1965); Administrator	31 December 1957	23 January 1958	23 days	Dulwich, England	Colonial Secretary	
23		Sir Robert Brown Black 柏立基 (1906–1999)	23 January 1958	31 March 1964	6 years, 68 days	Edinburgh, Scotland	Colonial administrator	
		Edmund Brinsley Teesdale 戴斯德 (1915–1997); Administrator	31 March 1964	14 April 1964	14 days	Shanghai, China	Colonial Secretary	
24		Sir David C. C. Trench 戴麟趾 (1915–1988)	14 April 1964	19 October 1971	7 years, 188 days	Quetta, India	Colonial administrator	
		Sir Hugh Norman-Walker 羅樂民 (1916–1985); Administrator	19 October 1971	19 November 1971	31 days	London, England	Colonial Secretary	
25		Sir Murray MacLehose 麥理浩 (1917–2000)	19 November 1971	8 May 1982	10 years, 170 days	Glasgow, Scotland	UK Ambassador to Denmark	
		Sir Philip Haddon-Cave 夏鼎基 (1925–1999); Acting governor	8 May 1982	20 May 1982	12 days	Hobart, Australia	Chief Secretary	
26		Sir Edward Youde 尤德 (1924–1986)	20 May 1982	4 December 1986	4 years, 198 days	Penarth, Wales	UK Ambassador to China	
		Sir David Akers-Jones 鍾逸傑 (1927–2019); Acting governor	4 December 1986	9 April 1987	126 days	Sussex, England	Chief Secretary	
27		Sir David Wilson 衛奕信 (born 1935)	9 April 1987	3 July 1992	5 years, 85 days	Clackmannanshire, Scotland	Diplomat	
		Sir David Ford 霍德 (1935–2017); Acting governor	3 July 1992	9 July 1992	6 days	England	Chief Secretary	
28		Chris Patten 彭定康 (born 1944)	9 July 1992	30 June 1997	4 years, 356 days	Lancashire, England	Chairman of Conservative Party	

== Firsts ==
- Charles Elliot, first administrator
- Sir Henry Pottinger, first governor, first Irishman and first Ulsterman to serve in the role
- Sir John Francis Davis, first Sinologist to serve as governor
- Sir John Bowring, first Puritan to serve as governor
- Sir John Pope Hennessy, first Irish Catholic to serve as governor
- Sir Matthew Nathan, first Jew to serve as governor
- Sir Francis H. May, first police chief to serve as governor and the first governor to suffer an assassination attempt (which failed)
- Sir Cecil Clementi, first Indian-born and Cantonese-speaking governor
- Sir Mark Young, first prisoner of war to serve as governor
- Takashi Sakai, first Japanese administrator to serve as governor
- Cecil Harcourt, first British military administrator to serve as governor (all past governors with military service had retired before assuming the post)
- Sir Murray MacLehose, first non-colonial officer to serve as governor; he was a diplomat, a foreign service officer
- Sir Edward Youde, first governor fluent in Mandarin; only governor to die in office
- Chris Patten, first politician to serve as governor; only governor not to don the formal dress as governor; only governor never to have held any title of nobility or knighthood during his tenure, the last Governor of Hong Kong under British rule before 1 July 1997

== Standards ==
Standard of the governor of Hong Kong, 1910–1955

Standard of the governor of Hong Kong, 1955–1959

Standard of the governor of Hong Kong, 1959–1997

== See also ==
- History of Hong Kong
- Lieutenant Governor of Hong Kong – second in command and acting governor (Colonial Secretary took over such role since 1870s) when the governor was not in Hong Kong until 1902
- Commander British Forces in Hong Kong
