= Transcription into Chinese characters =

Transcription
- Front cover of Names of the World's Peoples: A Comprehensive Dictionary of Names in Roman-Chinese, the official transcription guide of mainland China.
- Traditional Chinese: 音譯
- Simplified Chinese: 音译
- Literal meaning: sound translation
Transcriptions
Standard Mandarin
- Hanyu Pinyin: yīnyì

Transcription
- Traditional Chinese: 譯名
- Simplified Chinese: 译名
- Literal meaning: translated name
Transcriptions
Standard Mandarin
- Hanyu Pinyin: yìmíng

Transcription into Chinese characters is the use of traditional or simplified Chinese characters to phonetically transcribe the sound of terms and names of foreign words to the Chinese language. Transcription is distinct from translation into Chinese whereby the meaning of a foreign word is communicated in Chinese. Since English classes are now standard in most secondary schools, it is increasingly common to see foreign names and terms left in their original form in Chinese texts. However, for official and marketing use, and transliteration of names or words of Chinese minorities, transcription into characters remains very common.

Except for a handful of traditional exceptions, most modern transcription in mainland China uses the standardized Mandarin pronunciations exclusively.

== Official standards ==
Modern Standard Chinese consists of about 412 syllables in 5 tones, so homophones abound and most non-Han words have multiple possible transcriptions. This is particularly true since Chinese is written as monosyllabic logograms, and consonant clusters foreign to Chinese must be broken into their constituent sounds (or omitted), despite being thought of as a single unit in their original language. Since there are so many characters to choose from when transcribing a word, a translator can manipulate the transcription to add additional meaning. As an example, for the syllable jī, there is a choice of some 120 characters that have this as a Hanyu Pinyin reading.

In the People's Republic of China, the process has been standardized by the Proper Names and Translation Service of the state-run Xinhua News Agency. Xinhua publishes an official reference guide, the Names of the World's Peoples: a Comprehensive Dictionary of Names in Roman-Chinese (世界人名翻译大辞典 Shìjiè Rénmíng Fānyì Dà Cídiǎn), which controls most transcription for official media and publication in mainland China. As the name implies, the work consists of a dictionary of common names. It also includes transcription tables for names and terms which are not included. The English table is reproduced below; those for a number of other languages are available on the Chinese Wikipedia.

The Basic Laws of the Hong Kong (article) and Macau (article) Special Administrative Regions provide that "Chinese" will be the official languages of those territories, in addition to English and Portuguese, respectively, leaving ambiguous the relative preference for Cantonese and Mandarin. In practice, transcriptions based on both Cantonese and Mandarin pronunciations have been used.

In Singapore, transcription standards are established by the Translation Standardisation Committee for the Chinese Media and in 2014 was moved to National Translation Committee (NTC) of the Ministry of Communication and Information. In Malaysia, transcription/translation standards are established by Chinese Language Standardisation Council of Malaysia.

Increasingly, other countries are setting their own official standards for Chinese transcription and do not necessarily follow Xinhua's versions, just as Xinhua's version differs from Wade–Giles and other international standards. For example, the United States embassy in China recommends rendering "Obama" as 欧巴马 Ōubāmǎ, while Xinhua uses 奥巴马 Àobāmǎ.

== History ==
Transcription of foreign terms may date to the earliest surviving written records in China, the Shang oracle bones. As the Huaxia spread from their initial settlements near the confluence of the Wei and Yellow rivers, they were surrounded on all sides by other peoples. The Chinese characters developed to describe them may have originally transcribed local names, such as the proposed connection between the original "Eastern Yi" people (東夷) and an Austroasiatic word for "sea". However, the tendency within China was to fit new groups into the existing structure, so that, for example, "Yi" eventually became a word for any "barbarian" and the name "Yue" (戉 & 越), originally applied to a people northwest of the Shang, was later applied to a people south of the Yangtze and then to many cultures as far south as Vietnam. Interaction with the states of Chu, Wu, and Yue during the Spring and Autumn and Warring States periods of the later Zhou brings the first certain evidence of transcription: most famously, the word jiāng (江), originally krong, derives from the Austroasiatic word for "river".

Besides proper names, a small number of loanwords also found their way into Chinese during the Han dynasty after Zhang Qian's exploration of the Western Regions. The Western Han also saw Liu Xiang's transcription and translation of the "Song of the Yue Boatman" in his Garden of Stories. Some scholars have tried to use it to reconstruct an original version of the otherwise unrecorded language of the Yangtze's Yue people before their incorporation into the Han.

The expansion of Buddhism within China during the later Han and Three Kingdoms period required the transcription of a great many Sanskrit and Pali terms. According to the Song-era scholar Zhou Dunyi, the monk and translator Xuanzang (of Journey to the West fame) handed down guidelines of "Five Kinds of Words Not to Translate" (simplified Chinese: 五种不翻; traditional Chinese: 五種不翻). He directed that transcription should be used instead of translation when the words are:

1. Arcane, such as incantations
2. Polysemous
3. Not found in China
4. Traditionally transcribed, not translated
5. Lofty and subtle, which a translation might devalue or obscure

These ancient transcription into Chinese characters provide clues to the reconstruction of Middle Chinese. In historical Chinese phonology, this information is called duìyīn (simplified Chinese: 对音; traditional Chinese: 對音; lit. 'corresponding sounds'); in Western Sinology, Baron Alexander von Staël-Holstein was the first to emphasize its importance in reconstructing the sounds of Middle Chinese. The transcriptions made during the Tang dynasty are particularly valuable, as the then-popular Tantra sect required its mantras to be rendered very carefully into Chinese characters, since they were thought to lose their efficacy if their exact sounds were not properly uttered.

The History of Liao contains a list of Khitan words phonetically transcribed with Chinese characters. The History of Jin contains a list of Jurchen words phonetically transcribed with Chinese characters. In the History of Yuan, Mongol names were phonetically transcribed in Chinese characters.

In the Ming dynasty, the Chinese government's Bureau of Translators (四夷馆 Sìyí Guǎn) and the Bureau of Interpreters (会同馆 Huìtóng Guǎn) published bilingual dictionaries/vocabularies of foreign languages like the Bureau of Translators' multilingual dictionary (华夷译语 Huá-Yí yìyǔ, 'Sino-Barbarian Dictionary'), using Chinese characters to phonetically transcribe the words of the foreign languages such as Jurchen, Korean, Japanese, Ryukyuan, Mongolian, Old Uyghur, Vietnamese, Cham, Dai, Thai, Burmese, Khmer, Persian, Tibetan, Malay, Javanese, Acehnese, and Sanskrit.

During the Qing dynasty some bilingual Chinese-Manchu dictionaries had the Manchu words phonetically transcribed with Chinese characters. The book 御製增訂清文鑑 ("Imperially-Published Revised and Enlarged mirror of Qing") in Manchu and Chinese, used both Manchu script to transcribe Chinese words and Chinese characters to transcribe Manchu words with fanqie.

As part of the promotion of Kaozheng studies in the philological field, Qianlong decided that the Chinese character transcriptions of names and words of the Khitan language in the History of Liao, the Jurchen language in the History of Jin, and the Mongolian language in the History of Yuan were not phonetically accurate and true to the original pronunciation. The histories were in fact hastily compiled and suffered from inaccurate and inconsistent phonetic transcriptions of the same names. He ordered the "Imperial Liao Jin Yuan Three Histories National Language Explanation" (欽定遼金元三史國語解 Qīndìng Liáo Jīn Yuán sān shǐ guóyǔjiě) project to "correct" the Chinese character transcriptions by referring to the contemporaneous descendants of those languages. Qianlong identified the Solon language with the Khitan, the Manchu language with the Jurchen, and the Mongolian language with the Mongolian. Solon, Mongolian, and Manchu speakers were consulted with on the "correct" pronunciations of the names and words and their Chinese transcriptions were accordingly changed. However the Khitan language has now been found by modern linguists to be a Mongolic language and is unrelated to the Solon language. The project was part of the Siku Quanshu. Qianlong also promulgated a theory that the Daur people were descended from a Khitan clan, changing the Khitan clan name 大賀 Dàhè, found in the History of Liao, to 達呼爾 Dáhū'ěr. The Chinese transcription of the Manchu clan name Niohuru 鈕祜祿 (Niǔhùlù) was edited and inserted in place of the Jurchen clan name 女奚烈 (Nǚxīliè).

"2. A learned committee, consisting of Chinese, Manchus, Mongols, western Mohammedans, etc. was appointed by the emperor K'ien-lung to revise the Yüan shi, and especially the foreign names of men, places etc. occurring so frequently in that book. These savants in their reformatory zeal, proceeded on the idea, that all the proper names had been incorrectly rendered in the official documents of the Mongols, and had to be changed. They pronounced the same verdict with respect to the histories of the Liao and the Kin. Thus in the new editions of the histories of the Liao, Kin and Yüan, all the original proper names without exception disappeared, and were replaced by names of a new invention, which generally have little resemblance to the original. For further particulars, compare my Notes on Chinese Mediaeval Travellers, p. 58, note 1. By this way of corrupting the names of the original histories, which have generally rendered foreign sounds as correctly as the Chinese language permits, the K'ien-lung editions of these works have become completely unserviceable for historical and geographical investigations. K'ien-lung was very proud of the happy idea of metamorphosing the ancient proper names, and issued an edict, that in future no Chinese scholar should dare to use the ancient names.

After the three histories had been corrupted, K'ien-lung ordered the same committee to explain the meanings of the new names; and this gave rise to a new work entitled: 遼金元史語解 Liao kin yüan shi yü kai, or "Explanation of words (proper names) found in the histories of the Liao, Kin and Yüan." In this vocabulary, all the names of men, countries, places, mountains, rivers etc.—of the three histories have been systematically arranged, but according to the new spelling. The original spelling of the name however is always given, and the chapters are indicated where the name occurs. This renders the vocabulary very useful for reference, and we may lay aside the fact, that the principal object in view of the learned committee, was the absurd explanation of the meaning of the newly-invented names. I may give a few examples of the sagacity these savants displayed in their etymological commentaries. The city of Derbend (the name means "gate" in Persian), situated on the western shore of the Caspian sea, is mentioned in the Yuan shi, as a city of Persia, and the name is written 打耳班 Da-r-ban. The committee changed the name into 都爾本 Du-r-ben, and explain that durben in Mongol means, "four." The name of Bardaa, a city of Armenia, is rendered in the original Yuan shi by 巴耳打阿 Ba-r-da-a. The committee will have the name to be 巴勒塔哈 Ba-le-t'a-ha, and comment that this name in Manchu means "the neck part of a sable skin." By 别失八里 Bie-shi-ba-li in the uncorrupted Yuan shi, Bishbalik is to be understood. The meaning of this name in Turkish, is " Five cities," and the term 五城 Wu-ch'eng, meaning also "Five cities," occurs repeatedly in the Yuan shi, as a synonym of Bie-shi-ba-li. The committee however transformed the name into 巴實伯里 Ba-shi-bo-li, and state that Ba-shi in the language of the Mohammedans means "head" and bo-li "kidneys."

The most recent edition of the Yüan shi (also with corrupted proper names) is dated 1824, but Archimandrite Palladius has noticed that it was only finished about twenty years later. This edition is not difficult of purchase, and I fancy it is the only edition of the Yuan shi found in European libraries. The numerous translations from the "Mongol history," found in Pauthier's M. Polo, have all been made from this corrupted text. At the time Klaproth and Rémusat wrote, the Yuan shi was unknown in Europe, and it seems, that even the old Catholic missionaries in Peking had not seen it. The old sinologues knew only an extract of the great "Mongol History"." - E. Bretschneider, Notices of the Mediæval Geography and History of Central and Western Asia, pp. 5-6.

Marshall Broomhall commented that Though a great soldier and a great litterateur, K'ien-lung did not escape some serious errors. At one time he appointed a learned committee of Chinese, Manchus, Mongols, and Western Mohammedans to revise the foreign names of men and places which occur in the Yüan Records. So unscientific was this work that the K'ien-lung editions of the Liao, Kin, and Yüan histories are practically useless. The title Kalif rendered Ha-li-fu was changed by the Committee into Farkha and is explained as being "a village in Manchuria."

Transcriptions of English in Chinese characters were used in a book to learn English dating to 1860 in the reign of the Xianfeng Emperor. During the late 19th century, when Western ideas and products flooded China, transcriptions mushroomed. They include not only transcriptions of proper nouns but also those of common nouns for new products. The influence was particularly marked in dialects near the major ports, like Shanghainese. Many of these phonemic loans proved to be fads, however, and popular usage and linguistic reformers subsequently favored calques or neologisms in their place.

== Sound and meaning ==
A transcription into Chinese characters can sometimes be a phono-semantic matching, i.e. it reflects both the sound and the meaning of the transcribed word. For example, Modern Standard Chinese 声纳 shēngnà "sonar", uses the characters 声 shēng "sound" and 纳 nà "receive, accept". 声 shēng is a phonetically imperfect rendering of the English initial syllable. Chinese has a large number of homo/heterotonal homophonous morphemes, which would have been much better phonetically (but not nearly as good semantically) – consider the syllable song (cf. 送 sòng 'deliver, carry, give (as a present)', 松 sōng 'pine; loose, slack', 耸 sǒng 'tower; alarm, attract' etc.), sou (cf. 搜 sōu 'search', 叟 sǒu 'old man', 馊 sōu 'sour, spoiled' and many others) or shou (cf. 收 shōu 'receive, accept', 受 shòu 'receive, accept', 手 shǒu 'hand', 首 shǒu 'head', 兽 shòu 'beast', 瘦 shòu 'thin' and so forth)."

Belarus (lit. "White Russia") is transcribed in Chinese as 白俄罗斯 Bái'éluósī, with 白 bái ("white") and 俄罗斯 Éluósī ("Russia") preserving the meaning of the original name. Similarly, the common ending -va in Russian female surnames is usually transcribed as 娃 wā, meaning "baby" or "girl", and the corresponding masculine suffix -[o]v is rendered as 夫 fū, meaning "man". In literary translations, Utopia was famously transcribed by Yan Fu as 烏托邦/乌托邦 Wūtuōbāng ("unfounded country") and Pantagruel was written as 龐大固埃/庞大固埃 Pángdàgù'āi, from 龐大/庞大 ("gigantic") and 固 ("solid", "hefty"). More recently, one translation of World Wide Web is 萬維網/万维网 Wànwéi Wǎng, meaning "ten thousand-knot net". Sometimes the transcription reflects chengyu or other Chinese sayings and idioms. For example, the Beatles are known in mainland China as 披頭士/披头士 Pītóushì, "the mop-heads", and in Taiwan and Hong Kong, 披頭四/披头四 Pītóusì, "the mop-head four", reflecting the chengyu 披頭散髮/披头散发 pītóu sànfǎ concerning disheveled hair. They can also reflect subjective opinions or advertising. Esperanto, now known as "the international language" or literally "language of the world" (世界語/世界语 Shìjièyǔ), was first introduced to China as 愛斯不難讀/爱斯不难读 Àisībùnándú, meaning "[We] love this [because it's] not difficult to read".

Given that a Chinese neologism can be a phono-semantic matching (i.e. in accordance with both the meaning and the sound of the foreign lexical item), an "innocent" transcription may be unwittingly interpreted as reflecting the meaning of the original. During the Qing dynasty, some Chinese scholars were unhappy to find China was located on a continent called 亞細亞/亚细亚 Yàxìyà, i.e. Asia, as 亞/亚 means "secondary" and 細/细 "small", believing that the Europeans were deliberately belittling the East. The ancient Japanese, or the Wa people were upset by their name being represented by the character 倭 wō ("small, short, servile") by the Chinese, and replaced it with 和 hé ("peace, harmony"). Modern Africans have accused the Chinese of racism, as "Africa" is written as 非洲 Fēizhōu ("negative, wrong continent") in Chinese. Whether these accusations were justified is controversial.

Cultural differences and personal preference about negative meaning is subjective. However, some translations are generally held to be inappropriate and are usually not used in today's transcriptions:

- Mozambique as 莫三鼻給/莫三鼻给 Mòsānbígěi, with the characters meaning "Do not three noses give". Today the country is more often transcribed as 莫桑比克 Mòsāngbǐkè.
- Aberdeen is a common name for places and people, rendered as 鴨巴甸 Yābādiàn/Aapbādīn, with 鴨/鸭 meaning duck. However a place in Hong Kong, Aberdeen, was originally called 香港仔 Hēunggóngjái, meaning "Hong Kong minor"; that is now the official name, but 鴨巴甸 is still used colloquially. Moreover, today the place is more often transcribed as 阿伯丁 Ābódīng/Abaakdīng.

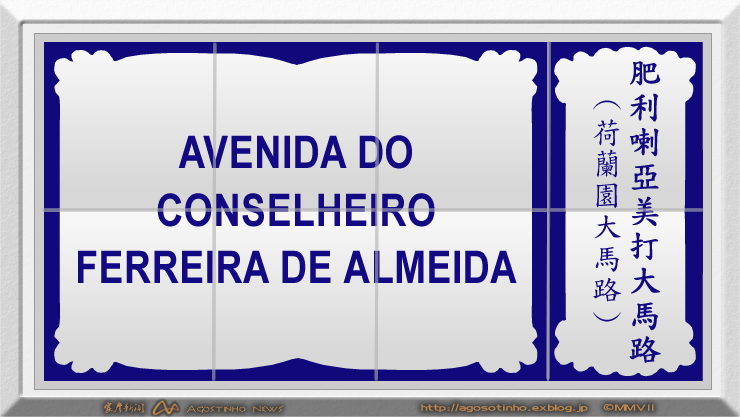
Sign for the Avenida do Conselheiro Ferreira de Almeida.

- A street in Macau is called Avenida do Conselheiro Ferreira de Almeida, after the official Ferreira de Almeida. Ferreira was transcribed as 肥利喇 Fèihleihla, as shown on the name of the street, with 肥 meaning "fat" (adj.).
- A street in Macau is called Avenida de Demetrio Cinatti. It has been transcribed as 爹美刁施拿地大馬路 Dēméihdīu Sīnàhdeih daaihmáhlouh, with 刁 dīu meaning cunning or wicked.

According to Ghil'ad Zuckermann, phono-semantic matching in Chinese is common in four semantic domains: brand names, computer jargon, technological terms and toponyms.

Some transcriptions are meant to have, or happen to have, positive connotations:

- United Kingdom is called 英國/英国 Yīngguó, literally "hero country". The first character, 英, is abbreviated from 英吉利 Yīngjílì, the early Chinese transcription of "English", but subsequently applied to the UK after it was formed from the union of England and Scotland.
- Germany is abbreviated as 德國/德国 Déguó, literally "moral country". The first character, 德, is abbreviated from 德意志 Déyìzhì (the Chinese transcription of "Deutsch", the German word for "German").
- United States of America is abbreviated 美國/美国 Měiguó, literally "beautiful country". It is abbreviated from 美利堅合眾國 Měilìjiān Hézhòngguó, 美利堅 being an early phonetic transcription of "America".
- Philippines as 菲律宾/菲律賓 Fēilǜbīn through transliteration. However, Filipino-Chinese in the Philippines uses 菲國 Fēiguó, meaning "Fragrant Lands".
- Athens as 雅典 Yǎdiǎn, literally "elegant" and "classical".
- Champs-Élysées as 香榭麗舍/香榭丽舍 Xiāngxièlìshè, meaning "fragrant pavilion (and) beautiful house".
- Dublin as 都柏林 Dūbólín, meaning "cypress forest capital".
- Firenze as 翡冷翠 Fěilěngcuì (by the poet Xu Zhimo), 翡翠 meaning "jadeite" and 冷 "cold". Today the city is usually known as 佛羅倫薩/佛罗伦萨 Fóluólúnsà or 佛羅倫斯 Fóluólúnsī, transcriptions based on the Anglo-French Florence rather than the endonym.
- Fontainebleau as 楓丹白露/枫丹白露 Fēngdānbáilù, meaning "red maple (and) white dew".
- Ithaca as 綺色佳/绮色佳 Qǐsèjiā, literally "gorgeous colour wonderful".
- Yosemite as 優山美地/优山美地 Yōushānměidì (also 優仙美地/优仙美地 Yōuxiānměidì, 優聖美地/优圣美地 Yōushèngměidì, 優詩美地/优诗美地 Yōushīměidì, or 優勝美地/优胜美地 Yōushèngměidì), meaning "elegant mountain / excellent and holy / elegant poem / superior (and) beautiful land".
- Champagne as 香檳/香槟 xiāngbīn, meaning "fragrant areca".

Foreign companies are able to choose representations of their names which serve advertising purposes:

- Coca-Cola as 可口可樂/可口可乐 Kěkǒu Kělè, meaning "delicious (and) fun".
- Sheraton Hotels as 喜來登/喜来登 Xǐláidēng, "love to visit".
- Best Buy as 百思買/百思买 Bǎisīmǎi, "buy (after) thinking a hundred times".
- Subway restaurants as 賽百味/赛百味 Sàibǎiwèi, "competing (with) a hundred tastes".
- Ikea as 宜家 Yíjiā, "suitable/proper for a home".
- Costco as 好市多 Hǎoshìduō, "market of many great things".
- Duolingo as 多鄰國/多邻国 Duōlínguó, "multiple neighboring countries".
- KFC as 肯德基 Kěndéjī, "agree to (a) virtuous foundation".
- McDonald's as 麥當勞/麦当劳 Màidāngláo, "wheat serve as labor". The name was also chosen because it represented a "well-known local street", MacDonnell Road (麥當勞道), with 道 meaning 'Road', in Hong Kong, which was the first Chinese speaking territory where a McDonald's restaurant opened (in 1975).
- BMW as 寶馬/宝马 Bǎomǎ, meaning "precious horse", sounding like its colloquial name "Beamer".
- Pizza Hut as 必勝客/必胜客 Bìshèngkè, "the guest must win".
- Wikipedia is 維基百科/维基百科 Wéijī Bǎikē, meaning "Wiki Encyclopedia". The Chinese transcription of "Wiki" is composed of two characters: 維/维, whose ancient sense refers to "ropes or webs", and alludes to the Internet; and 基, meaning "foundations". The name can be interpreted as "the encyclopedia that connects the fundamental knowledge of humanity".

== Regional differences ==
Mainland China, Singapore and Malaysia use simplified characters in its transcriptions, while Taiwan, Hong Kong and Macau typically use traditional characters. In addition, transcriptions used in Chinese speaking regions sometimes differ from official transcriptions. For example "Hawaii" (哈瓦伊 Hāwǎyī) is rendered as 夏威夷 Xiàwēiyí in most Chinese-language media while New Zealand (新西兰 Xīnxīlán) is transcribed by Taiwan media as 紐西蘭 Niǔxīlán.

In general, mainland China tends to preserve the pronunciation of names deriving from their language of origin while Taiwan often transcribes them according to the English pronunciation. For example, the Russian President Vladimir Putin is known as 普京 Pǔjīng in mainland sources after the native Russian pronunciation [ˈputʲɪn], whereas the name is rendered as 普丁 Pǔdīng in Taiwan. Meanwhile, Hong Kong and Macau transcribe names using Cantonese pronunciations, although this has become less common following their handovers.

Cantonese transcriptions are now frequently cribbed from the mainland, even if the transcription's local pronunciation does not match up with the original language. For example, sources in Hong Kong and Macau follow the mainland transcription 普京 for Putin, even though its Cantonese pronunciation being Póugīng.

In 2016, a controversy arose in Hong Kong when protestors petitioned Nintendo to reverse its decision of converting the Hong Kong names of over 100 Pokémon into the mainland Chinese equivalents of their names, including its most famous character Pikachu. In the first half of 2016, Nintendo announced that it would change Pikachu's name from its original Cantonese name, Béikāchīu 比卡超, to Pèihkāyāu in favor of fitting the Mandarin pronunciation, Píkǎqiū 皮卡丘, in the most recent series of Pokémon games, Pokémon Sun and Moon, in order to standardize marketing in the Greater China region.

Regional transcriptions into Chinese
English	Mainland China, Singapore and Malaysia	Hong Kong and Macau	Taiwan
Hitler	希特勒(Xītèlè)	希特拉(Hēidahklāai)	希特勒(Xītèlè)
Clinton	克林顿(Kèlíndùn)	克林頓(Hāaklàhmdeuhn)	柯林頓(Kēlíndùn)
Bush	布什(Bùshí)	布殊(Bousyùh)	布希(Bùxī)
Obama	奥巴马(Àobāmǎ)	奧巴馬(Oubāmáh)	歐巴馬(Ōubāmǎ)
Sydney	悉尼(Xīní)	悉尼(Sīknèih)	雪梨(Xuělí)
Donald Trump	唐纳德(Tángnàdé)·特朗普(Tèlǎngpǔ)	當勞(Dōnglòuh)·特朗普(Dahklóhngpóu)	唐納(Tángnà)·川普(Chuānpǔ)

Even though Malaysia had their official transliteration names for ministers and currency unit (Malaysian Ringgit), China did not accept those transliterations and proceed to use their own transliterations. For Malay names, transliterations usually uses their pronunciation to transliterate into Chinese characters instead of their appeared romanization (e.g., Xinhua's translation usually transliterate letter by letter instead of following their pronunciation).

== Transcription table ==
The table below is the English-into-Chinese transcription table from Xinhua's Names of the World's Peoples. This table uses the International Phonetic Alphabet for English vowels (rows) and consonants (columns).

Transcription from English (IPA) into Chinese
	–	b	p	d	t	ɡ	k	v	w	f	z, dz	ts	s, ð, θ	ʒ	ʃ	dʒ	tʃ	h	m	n	l	r	j	ɡʷ	kʷ	hʷ
–		布(bù)	普(pǔ)	德(dé)	特(tè)	格(gé)	克(kè)	夫(fū) (弗(fú))	夫(fū) (弗(fú))	夫(fū) (弗(fú))	兹(zī)	茨(cí)	斯(sī) (丝(sī))	日(rì)	什(shí)	奇(qí)	奇(qí)	赫(hè)	姆(mǔ)	恩(ēn)	尔(ěr)	尔(ěr)	伊(yī)	古(gǔ)	库(kù)	胡(hú)
ɑː, æ, ʌ	阿(ā)	巴(bā)	帕(pà)	达(dá)	塔(tǎ)	加(jiā)	卡(kǎ)	瓦(wǎ) (娃(wá))	瓦(wǎ) (娃(wá))	法(fǎ) (娃(wá))	扎(zhā)	察(chá)	萨(sà) (莎(shā))	扎(zhā)	沙(shā) (莎(shā))	贾(jiǎ)	查(chá)	哈(hā)	马(mǎ) (玛(mǎ))	纳(nà) (娜(nà))	拉(lā)	拉(lā)	亚(yà) (娅(yà))	瓜(guā)	夸(kuā)	华(huá)
ɛ, eɪ	埃(āi)	贝(bèi)	佩(pèi)	德(dé)	特(tè)/泰(tài)	盖(gài)	凯(kǎi)	韦(wéi)	韦(wéi)	费(fèi)	泽(zé)	策(cè)	塞(sài)	热(rè)	谢(xiè)	杰(jié)	切(qiè)	赫(hè)/黑(hēi)	梅(méi)	内(nèi)	莱(lái)	雷(léi) (蕾(lěi))	耶(yē)	圭(guī)	奎(kuí)	惠(huì)
ɜ, ə	厄(è)	伯(bó)	珀(pò)	德(dé)	特(tè)	格(gé)	克(kè)	弗(fú)	沃(wò)	弗(fú)	泽(zé)	策(cè)	瑟(sè)	热(rè)	舍(shè)	哲(zhé)	彻(chè)	赫(hè)	默(mò)	纳(nà) (娜(nà))	勒(lè)	勒(lè)	耶(yē)	果(guǒ)	阔(kuò)	霍(huò)
iː, ɪ	伊(yī)	比(bǐ)	皮(pí)	迪(dí)	蒂(dì)	吉(jí)	基(jī)	维(wéi)	威(wēi)	菲(fēi)	齐(qí)	齐(qí)	西(xī)	日(rì)	希(xī)	吉(jí)	奇(qí)	希(xī)	米(mǐ)	尼(ní) (妮(nī))	利(lì) (莉(lì))	里(lǐ) (丽(lì))	伊(yī)	圭(guī)	奎(kuí)	惠(huì)
ɒ, ɔː, oʊ	奥(ào)	博(bó)	波(bō)	多(duō)	托(tuō)	戈(gē)	科(kē)	沃(wò)	沃(wò)	福(fú)	佐(zuǒ)	措(cuò)	索(suǒ)	若(ruò)	肖(xiāo)	乔(qiáo)	乔(qiáo)	霍(huò)	莫(mò)	诺(nuò)	洛(luò)	罗(luó) (萝(luó))	约(yuē)	果(guǒ)	阔(kuò)	霍(huò)
uː, ʊ	乌(wū)	布(bù)	普(pǔ)	杜(dù)	图(tú)	古(gǔ)	库(kù)	武(wǔ)	伍(wǔ)	富(fù)	祖(zǔ)	楚(chǔ)	苏(sū)	茹(rú)	舒(shū)	朱(zhū)	楚(chǔ)	胡(hú)	穆(mù)	努(nǔ)	卢(lú)	鲁(lǔ)	尤(yóu)		库(kù)	
juː, jʊ	尤(yóu)	比尤(bǐyóu)	皮尤(píyóu)	迪尤(díyóu)	蒂尤(dìyóu)	久(jiǔ)	丘(qiū)	维尤(wéiyóu)	威尤(wēiyóu)	菲尤(fēiyóu)	久(jiǔ)	丘(qiū)	休(xiū)		休(xiū)	久(jiǔ)	丘(qiū)	休(xiū)	缪(miù)	纽(niǔ)	柳(liǔ)	留(liú)				
aɪ	艾(ài)	拜(bài)	派(pài)	代(dài) (黛(dài))	泰(tài)	盖(gài)	凯(kǎi)	韦(wéi)	怀(huái)	法(fǎ)	宰(zǎi)	蔡(cài)	赛(sài)		夏(xià)	贾(jiǎ)	柴(chái)	海(hǎi)	迈(mài)	奈(nài)	莱(lái)	赖(lài)	耶(yē)	瓜伊(guāyī)	夸(kuā)	怀(huái)
aʊ	奥(ào)	鲍(bào)	保(bǎo)	道(dào)	陶(táo)	高(gāo)	考(kǎo)	沃(wò)	沃(wò)	福(fú)	藻(zǎo)	曹(cáo)	绍(shào)		绍(shào)	焦(jiāo)	乔(qiáo)	豪(háo)	毛(máo)	瑙(nǎo)	劳(láo)	劳(láo)	尧(yáo)		阔(kuò)	
æn, ʌn, æŋ	安(ān)	班(bān)	潘(pān)	丹(dān)	坦(tǎn)	甘(gān)	坎(kǎn)	万(wàn)	万(wàn)	凡(fán)	赞(zàn)	灿(càn)	桑(sāng)		尚(shàng)	詹(zhān)	钱(qián)	汉(hàn)	曼(màn)	南(nán)	兰(lán)	兰(lán)	扬(yáng)	关(guān)	宽(kuān)	环(huán)
ɑn, aʊn, ʌŋ, ɔn, ɒn, ɒŋ	昂(áng)	邦(bāng)	庞(páng)	当(dāng)	唐(táng)	冈(gāng)	康(kāng)	旺(wàng)	旺(wàng)	方(fāng)	藏(zàng)	仓(cāng)	桑(sāng)	让(ràng)	尚(shàng)	章(zhāng)	昌(chāng)	杭(háng)	芒(máng)	南(nán)	朗(lǎng)	朗(lǎng)	扬(yáng)	光(guāng)	匡(kuāng)	黄(huáng)
ɛn, ɛŋ, ɜn, ən, əŋ	恩(ēn)	本(běn)	彭(péng)	登(dēng)	滕(téng)	根(gēn)	肯(kěn)	文(wén)	文(wén)	芬(fēn)	曾(zēng)	岑(cén)	森(sēn)	任(rèn)	申(shēn)	真(zhēn)	琴(qín)	亨(hēng)	门(mén)	嫩(nèn)	伦(lún)	伦(lún)	延(yán)	古恩(gǔ'ēn)	昆(kūn)	
ɪn, in, ɪən, jən	因(yīn)	宾(bīn)	平(píng)	丁(dīng)	廷(tíng)	金(jīn)	金(jīn)	温(wēn)	温(wēn)	芬(fēn)	津(jīn)	欣(xīn)	辛(xīn)		欣(xīn)	金(jīn)	钦(qīn)	欣(xīn)	明(míng)	宁(níng)	林(lín) (琳(lín))	林(lín) (琳(lín))	因(yīn)	古因(gǔyīn)	昆(kūn)	
ɪŋ	英(yīng)	宾(bīn)	平(píng)	丁(dīng)	廷(tíng)	京(jīng)	金(jīn)	温(wēn)	温(wēn)	芬(fēn)	京(jīng)	青(qīng)	辛(xīn)		兴(xìng)	京(jīng)	青(qīng)	兴(xìng)	明(míng)	宁(níng)	林(lín) (琳(lín))	林(lín) (琳(lín))	英(yīng)	古英(gǔyīng)		
un, ʊn, oʊn	温(wēn)	本(běn)	蓬(péng)	敦(dūn)	通(tōng)	贡(gòng)	昆(kūn)	文(wén)	文(wén)	丰(fēng)	尊(zūn)	聪(cōng)	孙(sūn)		顺(shùn)	准(zhǔn)	春(chūn)	洪(hóng)	蒙(méng)	农(nóng)	伦(lún)	伦(lún)	云(yún)			
ʊŋ	翁(wēng)	邦(bāng)	蓬(péng)	东(dōng)	通(tōng)	贡(gòng)	孔(kǒng)	翁(wēng)	翁(wēng)	丰(fēng)	宗(zōng)	聪(cōng)	松(sōng)	容(róng)	雄(xióng)	琼(qióng)	琼(qióng)	洪(hóng)	蒙(méng)	农(nóng)	隆(lóng)	龙(lóng)	永(yǒng)			洪(hóng)

=== Notes ===
- When ⟨a⟩ is pronounced as [ə] at the beginning of a word, transcribe it according to the [ɑː] row.
- When ⟨ia⟩ is at the end of a word, transcribe the ⟨a⟩ as 亚(yà).
- When vowels ⟨a⟩, ⟨e⟩, ⟨i⟩, ⟨o⟩, and ⟨u⟩ are in an unstressed syllable, generally transcribe them according to their written forms.
- When diphthongs ⟨ai⟩ and ⟨ay⟩ are at the beginning of a word, transcribe them according to the [aɪ] row.
- When ⟨r⟩ or ⟨re⟩ is at the end of a word with a phonetic transcription of [ə], transcribe both as 尔(ěr).
- Transcribe [tr] and [dr] as [t] plus [r]- and [d] plus [r]-row characters.
- Transcribe ⟨m⟩ as [n] when it is before a ⟨b⟩ or ⟨p⟩. But when a ⟨b⟩ after ⟨m⟩ is not pronounced, still transcribe ⟨m⟩ according to [m].
- Generally still transcribe an aspirated unaspirated-consonant or an unaspirated aspirated-consonant according to its written form.
- 娅(yà), 玛(mǎ), 琳(lín), 娜(nà), 丽(lì), 莉(lì), 莎(shā), 黛(dài), 丝(sī), 妮(nī), etc. (shown as alternatives above) are used in female names.
- 弗(fú) is used at the beginning of a word. (shown as an alternative above)

== Exceptions ==
=== Translating names ===
The characters now employed in standardized transcription tend to have abstract or obscure meanings and have fallen out of use, so that their phonetic use is apparent. Therefore, in many cases, the Chinese names non-Chinese people adopt for themselves are not those that are phonetically equivalent but are instead "adapted" from or "inspired" by (i.e., translations of) the original. See, for instance, the Chinese names of the Hong Kong governors.

Some place names are translated instead of using transcription. For example, Salt Lake City is referred as 鹽湖城 in Chinese, which is a direct translation.

=== New characters ===
Very rarely, characters are specially made for the transcribed terms. This was formerly more common: by adding the appropriate semantic radical, existing characters could be used to give a sense of the sound of the new word. 江, for instance, was formed out of 氵 (the water radical) + 工, which at the time had the sound value khong, to approximate the Yue name *Krong. Similarly, the addition of 艹 (the grass radical) produced 茉莉 mòlì to translate the Sanskrit name for jasmine (malli) and 衣 (clothes) was added to other characters to permit 袈裟 jiāshā, the Chinese version of Sanskrit kasaya. Another such example is 乒乓 pīngpāng, the Chinese word for ping pong, in which both characters are formed by removing a stroke from the similar sounding character 兵 bīng, and at the same time, the two characters look like a net and a paddle. The most general radical for transcription is the mouth radical, which is used to transcribe not only certain foreign terms (such as 咖啡 kāfēi, "coffee"), but also terms for which no Chinese characters exist in non-Mandarin varieties of Chinese (such as in Cantonese). Such phono-semantic compounds make up the majority of Chinese characters, but new ones coined to communicate foreign words only infrequently reach common use today. Notable exceptions are the Chinese characters for chemical elements, which mostly consist of combining pre-existing characters with the appropriate radicals, such as 气 for gases.

== See also ==
- Sinicization
- Chinese Language Standardisation Council of Malaysia
- Romanization of Chinese
- Cyrillization of Chinese
- Ateji, the Japanese equivalent
- Place names in China
- Chinese exonyms
- Chinese characters for transcribing Slavonic, for transcription from Church Slavonic
- Jingtang Jiaoyu, for transcribing Arabic to Chinese characters
- The Secret History of the Mongols, a surviving document written in Mongolian transcribed to Chinese characters
- Official Cantonese translations of English names for British officials
