= National Education Examinations Authority =

Non-profit institution under the Ministry of Education of China

- 教育部教育考试院

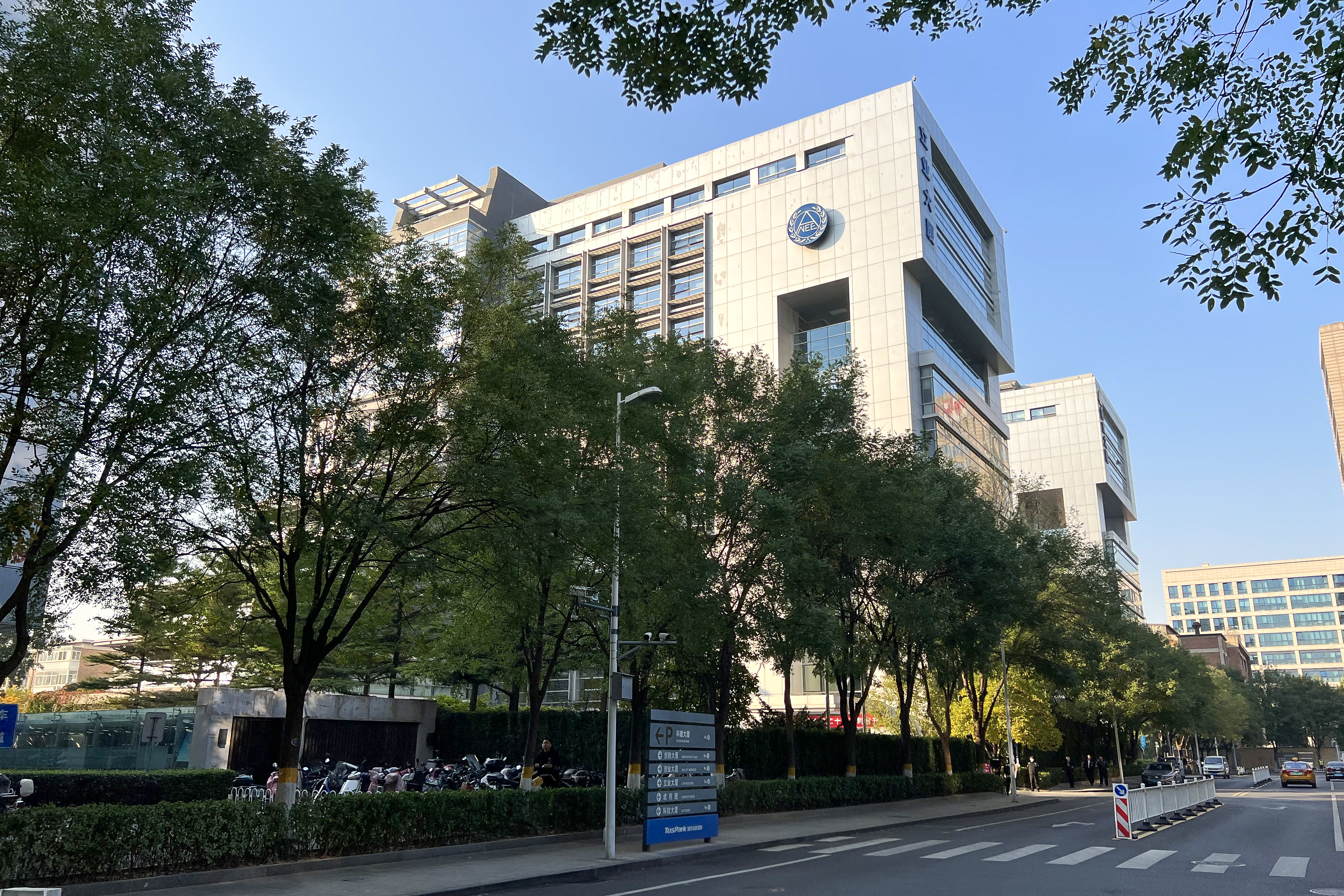
- Headquarters of NEEA
- Abbreviation: NEEA
- Predecessor: National Education Commission Examination Management Center (1987); National Education Commission Testing Center (1990); National Education Examinations Authority(1998)
- Type: Independent, Non-profit
- Headquarters: Haidian, Beijing
- Parent organization: Ministry of Education
- Website: neea.edu.cn

The National Education Examinations Authority (NEEA; Chinese: 教育部教育考试院) is a public institution affiliated with the Ministry of Education of China. Headquartered in Haidian, Beijing, it is mainly responsible for major education examinations in China.

On February 16, 2022, following the Ministry of Education's organizational adjustment on its subordinate independent institutions, NEEA's Chinese name changed from "教育部考试中心" (lit. 'Examination Center at the Ministry of Education') to "教育部教育考试院" (lit. 'Educational Examination Institution at the Ministry of Education').

== Tests ==
=== National examinations ===
- Gaokao (普通高等学校招生全国统一考试): Regular university or college entrance exam for students who have experienced senior high school education
- National College Entrance Examination For Adults (成人高等学校招生全国统一考试): Test to enter adult college or adult(continuing) education college in regular university
- Nationwide Master's Program Unified Admissions Examination (全国硕士研究生招生考试): an admission requirement for all graduate schools
- Self-Taught Higher Education Examinations (高等教育自学考试, STHEE): tests for getting a graduate certificate and bachelor's degree through self-study
- National Teacher Certification Examination (中小学教师资格考试, NTCE)

=== Social certificate examinations ===
- College English Test
- National Computer Rank Examination (全国计算机等级考试, NCRE)
- National Applied Information Level Test (全国计算机应用水平考试, NIT): Test inspired by Cambridge Information Technology
- Quanguo Waiyu Shuiping Kaoshi (WSK), including the Public English Test System (PETS) which goes up to PETS-5
- Chinese Calligraphy and Painting Test (书画等级考试, CCPT)
- Test of Chinese Language Ability for Ethnic Minorities (中国少数民族汉语水平等级考试, also known as 民族汉考; mínzúhànkǎo, MHK)

==== Stopped ====
- National Accreditation Examinations for Translators and Interpreters (NAETI)

=== Overseas examinations in mainland China ===
- TOEFL
- IELTS
- TestDaF
- JLPT
- TOPIK
- GRE
- GMAT
- DELF-DALF (Diplôme d'études en langue française and Diplôme approfondi de langue française )
- DELE
- LSAT
- GELPE-BRAS (CELPE-Bras)
- CYLE (Cambridge English: Young Learners)
- MSE (Main Suite Examinations of Cambridge Assessment English)
- CAEL (Canadian Academic English Language Assessment)
