= CET4 =

CET4 or CET-4 may be:

- College English Test CET-4, national English level test in the People's Republic of China
- Fort Simpson Island Airport, CET4 ICAO airport code, in the Northwest Territories, Canada
