= Broken English (disambiguation) =

Broken English refers to certain forms of incorrect or ungrammatical use of the English language.

Broken English may also refer to:

== Film ==
- Broken English (1981 film), a 1981 film
- Broken English (1996 film), a 1996 New Zealand film
- Broken English (2007 film), a 2007 film
- Broken English (2025 film), a British documentary

== Music ==
- Broken English (album), a 1979 album by Marianne Faithfull
  - "Broken English" (song)
- Broken English (band), a 1980s pop band
- "Broken English", a song by Adam Lambert from the album Trespassing
- "Broken English", a song by Rise Against from the album Revolutions per Minute
- Broken English (label), a part of the East West Records family of labels

== English language ==
- Engrish (Japanese: イングリッシュ) bad English found in Asia
  - Chinglish, bad English found in Asia
- Mute English, English as a written/read unspoken language
- Non-native pronunciations of English
- Torres Strait Creole, a creole language spoken in Australia

== See also ==
- List of English-based pidgins
- English-based creole languages
- List of macaronic forms of English
- Bad English (disambiguation)
