= NCRE =

NCRE may refer to:

- National Computer Rank Examination
- Renewable energy
