= Quanguo Waiyu Shuiping Kaoshi =

Language proficiency tests in China

- Simplified Chinese: 全国外语水平考试
- Traditional Chinese: 全國外語水平考試
Transcriptions
Standard Mandarin
- Hanyu Pinyin: Quánguó Wàiyǔ Shuǐpíng Kǎoshì

Quanguo Waiyu Shuiping Kaoshi ("National Foreign Language Proficiency Test," WSK) is a series of foreign language tests administered in mainland China for educators who did not major in foreign languages. The National Education Examinations Authority (NEEA) of China developed these tests. Performance on the WSK determines whether one is permitted to take training, studies, or additional studies within one's major in institutions outside of China.

Some universities make successful completion of the WSK as a requirement for promotion in one's academic title.

== Variants ==
- English: PETS-5 (Public English Test System).
- French: TNF
- German: NTD
- Japanese: NNS (日本語能力試験 Nihongo Nōryoku Shiken; 日语水平考试; Rìyǔ Shuǐpíng Kǎoshì)
- Russian: ТПРЯ (Russian: Тест по проверке уровня владения русским языком "Russian Language Proficiency Test"; 俄语水平考试; Éyǔ Shuǐpíng Kǎoshì).

== See also ==
- College English Test (CET)
