= Bad English (disambiguation) =

Bad English is an Anglo-American rock supergroup.

Bad English may also refer to:

== Music ==
- Bad English (album), 1989 debut album from the eponymous band

== English language ==
- Broken English, certain forms of incorrect or ungrammatical use of the English language.
- English profanity, coarse/foul/bad language in English
- Vernacular English, as opposed to standardized or school English
- English slang, not proper English
- Mute English, English as a written/read unspoken language
- Non-native pronunciations of English
- Engrish (Japanese: イングリッシュ) bad English found in Asia
  - Chinglish, bad English found in Asia

== See also ==
- List of English-based pidgins
- English-based creole languages
- List of macaronic forms of English
- Broken English (disambiguation)
