= List of official Cantonese translations of English names =

This is a list containing Cantonese translations of English names for foreign dignitaries, as translated by British or Hong Kong officials.

Most of the Cantonese translations in the list are those of British officials, which are made by the British Consulate General in Hong Kong. During the colonial period (until the Handover of Hong Kong in 1997), such translations were handled by government agencies including Official Languages Agency (superseding the Chinese Language Division of the Chief Secretary's Office) and British Trade Commission (predecessor of the Consulate General).

== British politicians ==
As remarked by the British officials, the translations are not definitive and it is possible that these may change over time or there may be alternative translations.

English	Cantonese	Year since (Note: "PM" indicates Prime Minister, "Cabinet" as cabinet minister, "Speaker" as Speaker of the House of Commons, "MP" as Member of House of Commons, "FM" as First Ministers, and "Lord" as Member of House of Lords.)	Source	Remarks
BLAIR, Tony	貝理雅	PM, 1997		
BROWN, Gordon	白高敦	PM, 2007		
BURNHAM, Andy	貝安德	PM, 2026		
CAMERON, David	甘民樂	PM, 2010	(Note: See official list: "FOI2024/17651 UK Cabinet List 2023.11.13". Foreign, Commonwealth & Development Office.)	卡梅倫 instead of the translated name is used (see the main article)
JOHNSON, Boris	莊漢生	PM, 2019		約翰遜 instead of the translated name is used (see the main article)
MAY, Theresa	文翠珊	PM, 2016		
MAJOR, John	馬卓安	PM, 1990		
STARMER, Keir	施紀賢	PM, 2024	(Note: See official list: "FOI2024/17651 UK Cabinet List 2024.07.05". Foreign, Commonwealth & Development Office.)	
SUNAK, Rishi	辛偉誠	PM, 2022		
THATCHER, Margaret (Mrs.)	戴卓爾夫人	PM, 1979		
TRUSS, Liz	卓慧思	PM, 2022		
ADONIS, Andrew	艾德思	Cabinet, 2009		
AINSWORTH, Bob	艾思和	Cabinet, 2009		
ALEXANDER, Douglas	艾禮遜	Cabinet, 2003		previously 艾力生
ALEXANDER, Danny	艾德禮	Cabinet, 2010		
ALEXANDER, Heidi	艾凱迪	Cabinet, 2024	(Note: See official list: "FOI2025/31083 Annex". Foreign, Commonwealth & Development Office.)	
ARGAR, Edward	晏嘉華	Cabinet, 2022		
ARMSTRONG, Hilary	艾希妮	Cabinet, 2001		
ASHTON, Catherine	艾嘉蓮	Cabinet, 2007		
ATKINS, Victoria	顏詠彤	Cabinet, 2023		
BADENOCH, Kemi	栢丹娜	Cabinet, 2022		or erroneously 柏丹娜
BALLS, Ed	博雅文	Cabinet, 2007		
BARCLAY, Steve	柏建熙	Cabinet, 2018		
BECKETT, Margaret	貝嘉晴	Cabinet, 1997		
BENN, Hilary	彭浩禮	Cabinet, 2003		
BERRY, Jake	包澤君	Cabinet, 2019		
BLEARS, Hazel	貝海珊	Cabinet, 2006		
BLUNKETT, David	白文傑	Cabinet, 1997		
BOTTOMLEY, Virginia (Mrs.)	包定禮夫人	Cabinet, 1992		
BRADLEY, Karen	龐碧琳	Cabinet, 2016		
BRADSHAW, Ben	白德生	Cabinet, 2009		
BRAVERMAN, Suella	柏斐文	Cabinet, 2020		
BROKENSHIRE, James	博敬誠	Cabinet, 2016		
BROWN, Nick	白禮勤	Cabinet, 1997		
BROWNE, Des	彭德	Cabinet, 2005		
BRYANT, Chris	柏懷恩	Cabinet, 2026		
BUCKLAND, Robert	白樂彬	Cabinet, 2019		
BYRNE, Liam	白理安	Cabinet, 2008		
CABLE, Vince	祈維信	Cabinet, 2010		or 祁維信
CAIRNS, Alun	祈啟思	Cabinet, 2016		
CAMPBELL, Alan	簡柏邦	Cabinet, 2024		
CARMICHAEL, Alistair	甘文康	Cabinet, 2013		
CHALK, Alexander	卓傲山	Cabinet, 2021		previously 卓艾歷
CHANNON, Paul	程隆	Cabinet, 1986		
CHAPMAN, Jenny	卓珍妮	Cabinet, 2025		
CLARK, Greg	祈國光	Cabinet, 2015		
CLARKE, Charles	祈卓禮	Cabinet, 2001		
CLARKE, Kenneth	祁淦禮	Cabinet, 1987		
CLARKE, Simon	夏簡勤	Cabinet, 2021		
CLEVERLY, James	祁湛明	Cabinet, 2019		previously 祁維利
COCKFIELD, Arthur	郭菲德	Cabinet, 1982		
COFFEY, Thérèse	高翠玲	Cabinet, 2019		
COOK, Robin	郭偉邦	Cabinet, 1997		
COOPER, Yvette	顧綺慧	Cabinet, 2008		
COUTINHO, Claire	郭嘉兒	Cabinet, 2023		
COX, Geoffrey	郝思賢	Cabinet, 2018		
CRABB, Stephen	郝智恆	Cabinet, 2014		
DARLING, Alistair	戴理德	Cabinet, 1997		
DAVEY, Ed	戴宏	Cabinet, 2012		
DAVIES, David TC	戴德瑋	Cabinet, 2022		
DAVIES, John	戴偉時	Cabinet, 1972		
DAVIS, David	戴德偉	Cabinet, 2016		
DENHAM, John	鄧俊安	Cabinet, 2007		
DODDS, Anneliese	杜迪詩	Cabinet, 2024		previously 杜安妮
DORRIES, Nadine	杜慧詩	Cabinet, 2021		
DONELAN, Michelle	唐萃蘭	Cabinet, 2020		
DOWDEN, Oliver	杜永敦	Cabinet, 2019		
EAGLE, Angela	葉安琪	Cabinet, 2026		
ELLIS, Michael	艾文浩	Cabinet, 2021		
EUSTICE, George	尤俊仕	Cabinet, 2020		
EVANS, Natalie	歐樂怡	Cabinet, 2016		
FAHNBULLEH, Miatta	方寶妮	Cabinet, 2026		
FALCONER, Charles	范克林	Cabinet, 2003		
FALLON, Michael	房應麟	Cabinet, 2014		
FLINT, Caroline	費嘉琳	Cabinet, 2008		
FORD, Vicky	霍慧琪	Cabinet, 2022		
FOX, Liam	霍理林	Cabinet, 2010		
FRAZER, Lucy	方惠珊	Cabinet, 2023		
FROST, David	霍禮思	Cabinet, 2021		
GAUKE, David	郭達瑋	Cabinet, 2016		
GILLAN, Cheryl	紀卓琳	Cabinet, 2010		
GLEN, John	簡俊恆	Cabinet, 2022		
GOLDSMITH, Peter	高仕文	Cabinet, 2001		
GOVE, Michael	高文浩	Cabinet, 2010		
GRAYLING, Chris	紀嘉林	Cabinet, 2012		
GREEN, Damian	祈達文	Cabinet, 2016		
GREENING, Justine	簡意寧	Cabinet, 2011		
GRIEVE, Dominic	葛偉富	Cabinet, 2010		
HAGUE, William	夏偉林	Cabinet, 2010		
HAIGH, Louise	賀樂怡	Cabinet, 2024		
HAIN, Peter	韓培德	Cabinet, 2002		
HAMMOND, Philip	夏文達	Cabinet, 2010		
HANCOCK, Matthew	夏國賢	Cabinet, 2015		
HANDS, Greg	夏漢仕	Cabinet, 2015		
HARMAN, Harriet	夏雅雯	Cabinet, 2007		
HARPER, Mark	夏萬恒	Cabinet, 2015		
HART, Simon	夏世民	Cabinet, 2019		
HAVERS, Michael	夏永善	Cabinet, 1987		
HEALEY, John	賀理安	Cabinet, 2024		
HEAPPEY, James	許澤明	Cabinet, 2022		
HEATON-HARRIS, Chris	夏禮思	Cabinet, 2022		
HERMER, Richard	何爾文	Cabinet, 2024		
HESELTINE, Michael	夏舜霆	Cabinet, 1983		
HEWITT, Patricia	賀韻芝	Cabinet, 2001		
HAILSHAM (Lord)	許琛(勳爵)	Cabinet, 1957		
HINDS, Damian	夏軒仕	Cabinet, 2018		
HOLDEN, Richard	何禮澤	Cabinet, 2023		
HOON, Geoffrey	禤智輝	Cabinet, 2007		
HOWARD, Michael	夏偉明	Cabinet, 1990		
HOWE, Geoffrey	賀維	Cabinet, 1979		
HOWELL, David	侯偉樂	Cabinet, 1979		
HUGHES, Cledwyn	郭偉賢	Cabinet, 1968		
HUHNE, Chris	禤傑思	Cabinet, 2010		
HUNT, Jeremy	侯俊偉	Cabinet, 2010		
HUTTON, John	夏敦	Cabinet, 2005		or 夏頓
HURD, Douglas	韓達德	Cabinet, 1984		
IRVINE, Derry	艾偉儀	Cabinet, 1997		
JACK, Alister	張毅德	Cabinet, 2019		
JAVID, Sajid	賈偉德	Cabinet, 2014		
JAYAWARDENA, Ranil	蔣華達	Cabinet, 2022		
JENKIN, Patrick	曾栢力	Cabinet, 1972		
JENKINS, Roy	曾競時	Cabinet, 1965		
JENRICK, Robert	鄭偉祺	Cabinet, 2019		
JOHNSON, Alan	莊翰生	Cabinet, 2004		
JOHNSON, Jo	—	Cabinet, 2019		約翰森 is used as Boris Johnson is named 約翰遜
JONES, Darren	鍾德麟	Cabinet, 2024		
JONES, David	鍾仕維	Cabinet, 2012		
JOSEPH, Keith	鍾基富	Cabinet, 1970		
JOWELL, Tessa	蔣黛思	Cabinet, 2001		
KEEGAN, Gillian	喬芝蘭	Cabinet, 2022		
KELLY, Ruth	簡樂芙	Cabinet, 2002		
KENDALL, Liz	簡麗詩	Cabinet, 2024		
KINNOCK, Stephen	祁世勳	Cabinet, 2026		
KWARTENG, Kwasi	關浩霆	Cabinet, 2021		
KYLE, Peter	靳秉德	Cabinet, 2024		
LAMMY, David	林德偉	Cabinet, 2024		
LAMONT, Norman	賴諾民	Cabinet, 1989		
LANG, Ian	梁治國	Cabinet, 1990		
LANSLEY, Andrew	凌士禮	Cabinet, 2010		
LAWS, David	羅德偉	Cabinet, 2010		
LAWSON, Nigel	羅信	Cabinet, 1981		
LEADSOM, Andrea	利雅華	Cabinet, 2016		
LEE, Frederick	李輝德	Cabinet, 1964		
LETWIN, Oliver	利凱輝	Cabinet, 2014		
LEWIS, Brandon	盧柏敦	Cabinet, 2018		
LIDDELL, Helen	利凱琳	Cabinet, 2001		
LIDINGTON, David	李達德	Cabinet, 2016		
MAHMOOD, Shabana	馬曼婷	Cabinet, 2024		
MALTHOUSE, Kit	莫孝傑	Cabinet, 2022		
MANDELSON, Peter	文德森	Cabinet, 1997		
McCARTNEY, Ian	麥家禮	Cabinet, 2003		
McFADDEN, Patrick	麥法德	Cabinet, 2024		
McLOUGHLIN, Patrick	麥樂賢	Cabinet, 2010		
McVEY, Esther	麥蔚宜	Cabinet, 2018		
MERCER, Johnny	麥忠義	Cabinet, 2022		
MIDGLEY, Anneliese	文安妮	Cabinet, 2026		
MILBURN, Alan	苗易彬	Cabinet, 1998		
MILIBAND, David	文禮彬	Cabinet, 2006		
MILIBAND, Ed	文立彬	Cabinet, 2007		
MILLER, Maria	麥瑪麗	Cabinet, 2012		
MILLING, Amanda	繆敏婷	Cabinet, 2020		
MITCHELL, Andrew	麥俊高	Cabinet, 2010		
MORDAUNT, Penny	莫佩琳	Cabinet, 2017		
MORGAN, Nicky	莫麗琪	Cabinet, 2014		
MORTON, Wendy	莫韻婷	Cabinet, 2022		
MOWLAM, Mo	毛美琳	Cabinet, 1997		
MUNDELL, David	萬達偉	Cabinet, 2015		
MURPHY, Paul	馬偉輝	Cabinet, 1999		
MURPHY, Jim	麥偉俊	Cabinet, 2008		
MURRAY, Ian	麥彥安	Cabinet, 2024		
MURRAY, James	梅俊明	Cabinet, 2024		
NANDY, Lisa	藍麗珊	Cabinet, 2024		
NEWTON, Tony	廖善同	Cabinet, 1988		
NOKES, Caroline	盧嘉蓮	Cabinet, 2018		
NORRIS, Alex	洛傲山	Cabinet, 2026		
OSBORNE, George	歐思邦	Cabinet, 2010		
PARKINSON, Cecil	白啟新	Cabinet, 1981		
PATEL, Priti	彭黛玲	Cabinet, 2016		
PATERSON, Owen	彭德森	Cabinet, 2010		
PATTEN, Chris	彭定康	Cabinet, 1989		
PERRY, Claire	彭麗雅	Cabinet, 2017		
PHILIP, Chris	范翹思	Cabinet, 2022		
PHILLIPSON, Bridget	方佩芝	Cabinet, 2024		
PICKLES, Eric	白高志	Cabinet, 2010		
POWELL, Enoch	鮑威賢	Cabinet, 1962		
POWELL, Lucy	布樂詩	Cabinet, 2024		
PRENTIS, Victoria	彭雅婷	Cabinet, 2022		
PRESCOTT, John	彭仕國	Cabinet, 1997		
PURNELL, James	貝禮高	Cabinet, 2007		
QUIN, Jeremy	祁澤明	Cabinet, 2022		
RAAB, Dominic	藍韜文	Cabinet, 2018		
RAYNER, Angela	韋雅蘭	Cabinet, 2024		
REED, Steve	李世勳	Cabinet, 2024		
REES, Peter	李必達	Cabinet, 1983		
REES-MOOG, Jacob	李思銘	Cabinet, 2019		
REEVES, Rachel	李韻晴	Cabinet, 2024		
REID, John	韋俊安	Cabinet, 2003		
RENTON, Tim	李連登	Cabinet, 1989		
REYNOLDS, Emma	韋樂婷	Cabinet, 2025		
REYNOLDS, Jonathan	韋諾韜	Cabinet, 2024		
RIFKIND, Malcolm	聶偉敬	Cabinet, 1986		
RIPPON, Geoffrey	李甫安	Cabinet, 1970		
ROBERTSON, George	羅沛誠	Cabinet, 1997		
RUDD, Amber	盧綺婷	Cabinet, 2015		
St JOHN-STEVAS, Norman	莊仕華	Cabinet, 1979		
SCOTLAND, Patricia	施佩雅	Cabinet, 2007		
SHACKLETON, Edward	石高頓	Cabinet, 1968		
SHAPPS, Grant	夏博思	Cabinet, 2019		
SHARMA, Alok	岑浩文	Cabinet, 2019		
SHEPHERD, Malcolm	石寶德	Cabinet, 1974		
SHORE, Peter	邵雅宜	Cabinet, 1967		
SHORT, Clare	商麗雅	Cabinet, 1997		
SMITH, Angela	施安琳	Cabinet, 2024		or 沈安琪?
SMITH, Chloe	施皓兒	Cabinet, 2022		
SMITH, Chris	冼敏治	Cabinet, 1997		
SMITH, Iain Duncan	施志安	Cabinet, 2010		
SMITH, Jacqui	沈妙思	Cabinet, 2006		previously 施卓琪
SMITH, John	施明輝	Cabinet, 1978		
SMITH, Julian	施俊安	Cabinet, 2017		
SOAMES, Christopher	蘇美斯	Cabinet, 1958		
SPELMAN, Caroline	施珮文	Cabinet, 2010		
SPENCER, Mark	施炳森	Cabinet, 2019		
STEVENS, Jo	施頌雅	Cabinet, 2024		
STEWART, Rory	施達偉	Cabinet, 2019		
STOWELL, Tina	司徒慧兒	Cabinet, 2014		
STRAW, Jack	施仲宏	Cabinet, 1997		
STRATHCLYDE (Lord)	施瑞德(勳爵)	Cabinet, 2010		
STREETING, Wesley	施卓添	Cabinet, 2024		
STRIDE, Mel	施榮達	Cabinet, 2019		
STUART, Graham	施敬恆	Cabinet, 2022		
TEBBIT, Norman	譚百德	Cabinet, 1981		
THORNEYCROFT, Peter	方禮嘉	Cabinet, 1951		
TIMMS, Stephen	唐士勳	Cabinet, 2006		
TREVELYAN, Anne-Marie	卓雅敏	Cabinet, 2020		
TROTT, Laura	卓諾華	Cabinet, 2023		
TRUE, Nicholas	杜立勤	Cabinet, 2022		
TUGENDHAT, Tom	董勤達	Cabinet, 2022		
TURLEY, Anna	杜安妮	Cabinet, 2025		
VILLIERS, Theresa	韋莉雅	Cabinet, 2012		
WALLACE, Ben	華禮仕	Cabinet, 2019		
WARSI, Sayeeda	韋倩婷	Cabinet, 2010		
WHITELAW, William	韋德羅	Cabinet, 1979		
WHITTINGDALE, John	韋廷毅	Cabinet, 2015		
WILLIAMS, Gareth	韋廉思	Cabinet, 1999		
WILLIAMSON, Gavin	韋廉信	Cabinet, 2016		
WOODWARD, Shaun	伍劭恩	Cabinet, 2007		
WRIGHT, Jeremy	衛俊明	Cabinet, 2014		
YOUNG, George	楊佐義	Cabinet, 1995		
ZAHAWI, Nadhim	查學禮	Cabinet, 2021		
BOOTHROYD, Betty	龐碧婷	Speaker, 1992		
BERCOW, John	柏爾勤	Speaker, 2009		previously 白高漢
HOYLE, Lindsay	賀立紳	Speaker, 2019		
AP IORWERTH, Rhun	楊偉思	FM, 2026		
DRAKEFORD, Mark	翟景輝	FM, 2018		previously 查克佛
GETHING, Vaughan	紀偉敬	FM, 2024		
FOSTER, Arlene	范愛玲	FM, 2016		
MORGAN, Eluned	文綺蘭	FM, 2024		
O'NEILL, Michelle	敖美雪	FM, 2024		
STURGEON, Nicola	施雅晴	FM, 2014		
SWINNEY, John	施榮禮	FM, 2024		
ABBOTT, Diane	艾德雅	MP		
AMESS, David	顏敏時	MP		
ANCRAM, Michael	艾敬文	MP		
ALEXANDER, Douglas	艾禮遜	MP		
ALLIN-KHAN, Rosena	艾露珊	MP		
ASHDOWN, Paddy	艾思定	MP		
BATTLE, John	貝德禮	MP		
BEBB, Guto	貝嘉濤	MP		
BLACKFORD, Ian	柏家輝	MP		
BROWNE, Jeremy	白偉明	MP		
CABORN, Richard	簡邦安	MP		
CORBYN, Jeremy	郝爾彬	MP		
DOUGHTY, Stephen	杜敬霆	MP		
ELMORE, Chris	晏啟思	MP		
EVANS, Nigel	艾文思	MP		
FALCONER, Hamish	方國林	MP		
FATCHETT, Derek	范卓德	MP		
FIELD, Mark	田銘祺	MP		
GAPES, Mike	祈沛思	MP		
GIBB, Nick	祈禮勤	MP		
JARVIS, Dan	翟偉紳	MP		
KEETCH, Paul	祈智忠	MP		
KHAN, Sadiq	簡世德	MP		
LAING, Eleanor	黎恩	MP		
LAWRENCE, Ivan	羅禮善	MP		
LONG-BAILEY, Rebecca	呂碧嘉	MP		
MacSHANE, Denis	麥守謙	MP		
MAUDE, Francis	麥浩德	MP		
MALHOTRA, Seema	馬詩敏	MP		
McDONNELL, John	麥祖恩	MP		
McMAHON, Jim	麥文翰	MP		
NARAYAN, Kanishka	藍偉恩	MP		
PEARSON, Ian	裴毅生	MP		
PENNYCOOK, Matthew	彭立勤	MP		
RAMMELL, Bill	韋明浩	MP		
REEVES, Ellie	李雅怡	MP		
SKINNER, Dennis	施謙禮	MP		
SMITH, Owen	施安偉	MP		
SOURBY, Anna	蘇碧玲	MP		or 蘇愛琳
SWINSON, Jo	施詠淳	MP		
SWIRE, Hugo	施維爾	MP		
THOMAS-SYMONDS, Nick	佟世民	MP		
THORNBERRY, Emily	方璧琳	MP		
WARNER, Norman	華樂民	MP		
WEST, Catherine	衛倩婷	MP		
WILLETTS, David	韋力生	MP		
BOSWELL, Tim	布思域	Lord		
COLLINS, Ray	郝偉文	Lord		
DAVIDSON, Ruth	戴慧沁	Lord		
MAIR, Robert	馬賢雅	Lord		
TIMPSON, James	田柏舜	Lord		
WILLOUGHBYDE BROKE (Lord)	韋朗布(勳爵)	Lord		
VALLANCE, Patrick	華磊思	Lord		

== British Diplomatic Service ==
This include British Consuls General and Deputy Consuls General to Hong Kong.

English	Cantonese	Source
BLYTHE, Esther	彭雅慧	
BRADLEY, Stephen	柏聖文	
BROWN, Stuart	鮑旭	
BURNS, Robert Andrew	貝恩德	
CORNISH, Francis	鄺富劭	
DAVIDSON, Brian	戴偉紳	
DOREY, Greg		
HEATH, Tamsin	何思婷	
HEYN, Andrew	賀恩德	
HODGE, James	何進	
LINDSAY, Iain	黎思安	
LYNCH, Paul	林博儒	
RAYNER, Bob	韋諾文	
ROBINSON, Sarah Elizabeth	樂秀慧	
SEATON, Andrew	奚安竹	
WILSON, Caroline	吳若蘭	
WOODWARD, Christopher Peter	胡德偉	

== Judges from Anglosphere ==
Cantonese names are assigned to overseas judges serving in Hong Kong judiciary as non-permanent judges in the Court of Final Appeal, including British judges. The translations are provided by the judiciary.

== Hong Kong colonial officials ==
The list include all Governors of Hong Kong as well as Chief Secretaries (known as Colonial Secretaries before 1976) since the governorship of Edward Stubbs.

English	Cantonese	Remarks
AKERS-JONES, David	鍾逸傑	
BLACK, Robert	柏立基	23rd Governor
BLAKE, Henry Arthur	卜力	12th Governor (Note: Governors prior to Edward Stubbs did not have official Cantonese names.)
BONHAM, George	般咸	3rd Governor; or 文咸
BOWEN, George	寶雲	9th Governor
BOWRING, John	寶靈	4th Governor; or 包令
BURGESS, Claude Bramall	白嘉時	
CALDECOTT, Andrew	郝德傑	19th Governor
CATER, Jack	姬達	
CLEMENTI, Cecil	金文泰	17th Governor
DAVID, Edgeworth	戴維德	
DAVIS, John Francis	爹核士	2nd Goveneror; or 戴維斯 or 德庇時
DES VOEUX, William	德輔	10th Governor
FORD, David	霍德	
GASS, Michael David Irving	祈濟時	
GIMSON, Franklin	詹遜	
GRANTHAM, Alexander	葛量洪	22nd Governor
HADDON-CAVE, Philip	夏鼎基	
HARCOURT, Cecil	夏慤	
HENNESSY, John Pope	軒尼詩	8th Governor
KENNEDY, Arthur	堅尼地	7th Governor
LUGARD, Frederick	盧吉	14th Governor; or 盧嘉
MacDONNELL, Richard Graves	麥當奴	6th Governor
MacDOUGALL, David Mercer	麥道高	
MacLEHOSE, Murray	麥理浩	25th Governor
MARSH, William Henry	馬師	or 馬殊 or 孖庶
MAY, Francis Henry	梅含理	15th Governor
NATHAN, Matthew	彌敦	13th Governor
NICOLL, John	列誥	
NORMAN-WALKER, Hugh	羅樂民	
NORTHCOTE, Geoffry	羅富國	20th Governor
PATTEN, Chris	彭定康	28th Governor
PEEL, William	貝璐	18th Governor
POTTINGER, Henry	砵甸乍	1st Governor; or 璞鼎查 (see also the main article for more information)
ROBERTS, Denys	羅弼時	
ROBINSON, Hercules; later Lord Rosmead	羅便臣 later 樂善美勳爵	5th Governor; or 羅士敏勳爵; 勳爵 refers to Lord
ROBINSON, William	羅便臣	11th Governor
SMITH, Norman Lockhart	史美	
SOUTHORN, Thomas	修頓	
STUBBS, Edward	司徒拔	16th Governor
TEESDALE, Edmund	戴斯德	
TRENCH, David	戴麟趾	24th Governor
WILSON, David	衛奕信	27th Governor; previously 魏德巍 (see the description in his entry for explanation)
YOUDE, Edward	尤德	26th Governor
YOUNG, Mark Aitchison	楊慕琦	21st Governor

== Other foreign dignitaries ==
English	Cantonese	Position / Title	Source
ARTHUIS, Jean	顏銓里	French minister	
Bertil (Prince)	貝迪(親王)	Swedish prince, Duke of Halland	
BLESSED, Brian	柏尚斌	English actor	
COORE, David	顧雅	Jamaican minister	
DAVIGNON, Étienne	戴偉幹	European Commission VP (in 1982)	
DE CROO, Herman	狄高	Belgian minister	
HAFERKAMP, Wilhelm	夏霍金	European Commission VP (1967–85)	
HARTLING, Poul	何特靈	Danish Prime Minister (1973–75)	
HELLSTRÖM, Mats	夏思朗	Swedish minister	
Joachim (Prince)	尤華京(皇子)	Danish prince, Count of Monpezat	
JONES, Gwyneth	鍾君蓮	Welsh operatic soprano	
MULLOVA, Viktoria	梅洛娃	Russian violinist	
PINDLING, Lynden	卞道寧	Bahamian Prime Minister (1973–92)	
RACAMIER, Henry	洛卡馬	French businessman, president of Louis Vuitton	
RAMPHAL, Shridath	林富爾	Commonwealth Secretary-General (1975–90)	
RINGADOO, Veerasamy	凌格度	Mauritian President (1992)	
ROSSINOT, André	羅斯諾	French minister	
SÉGUIN, Philippe	施健	French minister	
STUDER, Cheryl	施杜迪	American operatic soprano	
THORN, Gaston	唐吾	Luxembourgish Prime Minister (1974–79); European Commission President (1981–85)	
VAN AGT, Dries	范雅達	Dutch Prime Minister (1977–82)	
VAN ROOY, Yvonne	范羅依	Dutch minister	
VERITY, William Jr.	華理達	US official	
WISSMANN, Matthias	魏斯曼	German minister	
WOLFOWITZ, Paul	胡富域	President of the World Bank Group (2005–07)	
YEUTTER, Clayton	邱德	US official	
ZUKERMAN, Pinchas	蘇加文	Israeli-American violinist	
