= National Institute for Lifelong Education =

The National Institute for Lifelong Education (NILE) is a national level organization established in February 2008 as a result of the National Lifelong Education Policy as set forth in Article 19 of the Lifelong Education Act.

NILE aims to boost lifelong learning of people by efficiently carrying out tasks regarding the promotion of lifelong education.

== History ==
2007.11.22	The National Assembly passed Lifelong Act, Wholly Amended
2007.12.14	Promulgated Lifelong Education Act(Enforced 15 FEB 2008)
2007.12.20	Authorized statute of NILE
2008. 1. 2	Registration of NILE as a foundation
2008. 1.11	In Joo Park appointed first president of NILE
2008. 2.15	NILE launched
2008.10.6~8	Hosted CONFINTEA VI Asia–Pacific Regional Preparatory Conference
2009. 2.13	Commemorated 1st anniversary seminar
2009. 2.23	Ceremony of conferment of degrees of Academic Credit Bank System & Bachelor's Degree Examination for Self-Education

== See also ==
- Lifelong education
- Bachelor's Degree Examination for Self-Education System
- Academic Credit Bank System
