= Web International English =

Chinese English-language training center chain

- Simplified Chinese: 韦博英语
- Traditional Chinese: 韋博英語
Transcriptions
Standard Mandarin
- Hanyu Pinyin: Wéibó Yīngyǔ

Web Education
- Simplified Chinese: 韦博教育
- Traditional Chinese: 韋博教育
Transcriptions
Standard Mandarin
- Hanyu Pinyin: Wéibó Jiàoyù

Web International English (or WEBi) was a chain of English-language training centers in mainland China, operated by Web Education. Its headquarters was in Xuhui District, Shanghai.

Established by Gao Weiyu (高卫宇), who remained the CEO for the company's lifetime, in 1998, it was one of the first language center chains in the country. In 2019 locations began closing because of bankruptcy. Before the bankruptcy it had operations in 62 mainland Chinese cities with a total of 154 shops. The bankruptcy on Web resulted in scrutiny of and closure of other English language training centers. Students were redirected to EF Education First. Web closed in October 2019.

== See also ==
- English language education in China
