= Public English Test System =

The Public English Test System (PETS; simplified Chinese: 全国公共英语等级考试; traditional Chinese: 全國公共英語等級考試; pinyin: Quánguó Gōnggòng Yīngyǔ Děngjí Kǎoshì) is a test developed by the National Education Examinations Authority (NEEA) of the People's Republic of China. The PETS is the edition of the Quanguo Waiyu Shuiping Kaoshi (WSK) for the English language. It is available in five levels: PETS-1 through PETS-5. PETS testing is open to persons of all professions, ages, and academic backgrounds.

The tests were designed in 1996 as a way to test persons outside of the college and university system; the University of Cambridge Local Examinations Syndicate (UCLES) gave professional and technical support to the development. In 1999 pilot tests of the PETS occurred in several cities. The first mass-offering of the PETS was in 2003.

The testing levels are:

- PETS-5: Advanced level, sufficient for studying and/or working outside of China, sufficient for equivalent to an English major at a Chinese university after two years of studying English.
- PETS-4: Upper intermediate level, equivalent to that of a non-English major student at a Chinese university after three years of studying English.
- PETS-3: Intermediate level, equivalent to that of a non-English major student at a Chinese university after two years of studying English.
- PETS-2: Lower intermediate level, equivalent to that of a student entering university in China.
- PETS-1: Elementary level, equivalent to completion of three years of English instruction, or what someone would have at the junior high school level.

There is also a PETS-1B, which is below PETS-1.

== See also ==
- College English Test (CET)
- English education in China
