= Self-Taught Higher Education Examinations =

Educational qualification in China

- Simplified Chinese: 高等教育自学考试
- Traditional Chinese: 高等教育自學考試
Transcriptions
Standard Mandarin
- Hanyu Pinyin: Gāoděng Jiàoyù Zìxué Kǎoshì

Self-Taught Higher Education Examinations (STHEE) is a test for graduation of higher education and bachelor's degree in China. STHEE allows students to finish studies through self-study without going to school. It is practiced by National Education Examinations Authority (NEEA) of China. NEEA is an agency of the Chinese Ministry of Education.

== History ==
Since 1981, China has held STHEE every year. In 1988, temporary regulations of STHEE was enacted by the State Council of China and the STHEE system combined with self-study, social help and national examinations was confirmed.

In 1998, the 9th National People's Congress, the legislature in Mainland China, adopted Higher Education Law of the People's Republic of China and Article 21 of the Law states:

The state practices self-taught higher education examination system. Students having passed the examination shall be issued corresponding certificates of educational background or other certificates of studies.

A similar test, the Bachelor's Degree Examination for Self-Education, was established in South Korea in the early 1990s.

== Major ==
Same as students on regular university or college via the National College Entrance Examination, STHEE also has two levels, specialized (equivalent to two- or three- year specialized program in regular) and undergraduate (equivalent to four-year undergraduate program in regular).

Not all majors will be opened in a region and a same major may have different courses by region or examiner university.

=== Undergraduate ===
- Economics: 9
- Law: 8
- Education: 11
- Literature: 19
- Science: 5
- Engineering: 46
- Agriculture: 10
- Medicine: 8
- Management: 32
- Art: 9

A total of 157 specific majors.

=== Specialized ===
- Agriculture, Forestry, Husbandry and Fishing: 5
- Natural Resources and Safety: 3
- Energy Power and Materials: 1
- Civil Engineering and Architecture: 6
- Equipment Manufacturing: 9
- Biology and Chemical Engineering: 2
- Food, Medicine and Grain: 3
- Transportation and Communication: 3
- Electronic Information: 8
- Medical and Health: 5
- Finance, Economics and Business: 16
- Tourism: 4
- Culture and Arts: 12
- Journalism and Communication: 3
- Education and Sport: 13
- Public Security and Justice: 3
- Public Management and Service: 5

A total of 101 specific majors.

== Organization ==
=== Provincial educational examinations authority ===
Each provincial educational examinations authority (regional EEA) organizes and manages STHEE in its province or municipality or autonomous region. In the military, the People's Liberation Army (PLA), has an independent authority, the STHEE Committee of the Chinese People's Liberation Army (中国人民解放军高等教育自学考试委员会), to organize and manage its STHEE.

=== Examiner university ===
The examiner university is a college or university chosen by regional EEA and responsible for participating in the course, rating of papers, holding practical courses including dissertation and issuing degree certificate(undergraduate only).

The examiner universities in the army STHEE are all related to the PLA.

== Examinations ==
In general, for self-taught examination programmes at the Diploma level, the total number of examination subjects should not be lesser than 15, with a total credit requirement of no less than 70 credits. For undergraduate programmes, the total number of examination courses should not be lesser than 13, with a total credit requirement of no less than 70 credits.

A plan of a major normally has two types of tests, practical courses and written courses which are also categorized into national examinations and provincial examinations, but many majors do not have provincial examinations.

National examinations is produced by NEEA or others designated by NEEA, and NEEA organizes teachers and experts to write and publish textbooks for it. The content of textbooks and exam refer to the same level of regular university or college.

Provincial examinations and created by region EEA or inter-provincial organizations or the army authority.

=== Process ===
National examinations is generally held twice a year, once for two days, in April and October. Students can freely choose any one to four course(s) in national examination each time.

In several provinces or in the army, provincial examinations is held there twice a year, in January and July. In other provinces, the date may be the day(s) after or before the national performance, it is decided by region EEA or the army authority.

Practical course is held by examiner university. If the practical course has corresponding written course, student must pass it before taking the practical course. For undergraduate students, practical includes dissertation.

== Graduating ==
Students passing the examinations of all courses that a major requires can be issued a graduate certificate.

For undergraduate students, in order to obtain a bachelor's degree, he/she must meet other requirements by examiner university.

== See also ==
- Bachelor's Degree Examination for Self-Education System (South Korea)
