= Academic Credit Bank System =

Academic Credit Bank System (Korean: 학점은행제) is a system of South Korea in which various forms of learning and qualifications that occur not only in school but also outside of school are recognized as academic credits in accordance with the "Act on Credit Recognition" (학점인정 등에 관한 법률) and students can obtain a degree by accumulating credits and meeting certain standards.

Academic Credit Bank System is governed by National Institute for Lifelong Education.

A bachelor's degree is granted if all degree requirements set forth in the law are met, including 140 credits or more, including major and liberal arts credits, and 80 credits or more (120 credits or more for a 3-year system), including major and liberal arts credits, for a bachelor's degree. You can acquire . Degrees awarded through the Credit Bank System are recognized as equivalent to those who graduated from a university under Article 2, Paragraph 1 of the Higher Education Act or a junior college under Article 2, Subparagraph 4 of the same Act.

== Equivalence with bachelor's degree ==
A bachelor's degree can be obtained if all degree requirements set forth in the law are met, including a total of 140 or more credits, including major and liberal arts credits.

A two-year associate degree can be earned by earning more than 80 credits, including major and liberal arts credits, and a three-year associate degree can be earned by earning more than 120 credits.

A bachelor's degree awarded through the Academic Credit Bank System is recognized as having an academic background equivalent to that of a graduate of a university specified in Article 2, Paragraph 1 of the "Higher Education Act" (고등교육법). An associate degree awarded through the Academic Credit Bank System is recognized as having an academic background equivalent to that of a graduate of a junior college under Article 2, Paragraph 4 of the Higher Education Act.

== See also ==
- Bachelor's Degree Examination for Self-Education System
- National Institute for Lifelong Education
