= Bachelor's Degree Examination for Self-Education System =

South Korean higher education exam

The Bachelor's Degree Examination for Self-Education System (BDES, Korean: 독학학위제) makes it possible to obtain a bachelor's degree without attending a regular college or university by passing the examination administered by the South Korean government.

The Constitution of the Republic of Korea states the government should promote lifelong education. To actualize this, "the Law of Bachelor’s Degree Examination for Self-Education" was established on 7 April 1990.

== History ==
- 1990 April 7, Promulgation of the Act of bachelor's degree Examination for Self-Education (Statute No. 4227)
- 1990 June 20, Establishment of the Department of the Degree Approval at the National Board of Educational Evaluation
- 1992, The 1st Conferment of bachelor's degrees
- 1998 January 1, Transfer of the control to Korea National Open University (KNOU)
- 2008 February 15, Transfer of control to National Institute for Lifelong Education (NILE) according to "the amendment of the Lifelong Education Act"

== Major ==
- Korean Language & Literature
- English Language & Literature
- Business Administration
- Public Administration
- Law
- Computer Science
- Home Economics
- Psychology
- Information & communications engineering
- Childhood Education (Only 3rd and final exam)
- Nursing (Only final exam)
- Chinese Language & Literature (Closed)
- Mathematics (Closed)
- Agriculture (Closed)

Three major fields (Chinese Language & Literature, Mathematics, and Agriculture) were closed because of the decrease in the number of applicants. But, those who already passed more than a course in the three major fields are still allowed to apply for their further examinations.

Childhood education is established only in the 3rd and the final examination, and Nursing is established only in the final examination because it requires a practicum.

== Process ==
There are 4 exams for obtaining a bachelor's degree. Applying for each exam requires qualification. For example, a person who is eligible to apply for the second exam does not need to pass the first exam.

- 1st exam: Qualifying Examination for Liberal Arts
- 2nd exam: Qualifying Examination for Major-Basic
- 3rd exam: Qualifying Examination for Major-Advanced
- Final exam: Comprehensive Examination

Each exam is held once a year, which means that it takes at least a year to obtain a bachelor's degree.

== See also ==
- Self-Taught Higher Education Examinations (China)
- National Institute for Lifelong Education
- Academic Credit Bank System
