= Mute English =

Term for limited speaking and listening comprehension of English

Mute English is a term coined in the People's Republic of China to describe a phenomenon where people cannot speak English well and have a poor listening comprehension as a second language, typically through the traditional method of English language teaching where English is only taught as a subject. The phrase is a calque of the Chinese phrase "哑巴英语" (yǎbā yīngyǔ in pinyin). The phenomenon is sometimes referred to as Dumb English.

Mute English occurs primarily due to an emphasis on literacy, grammar, and correctness in language education. Efforts to mitigate Mute English in China have resulted in numerous commercial products including TEFL schools and teach-yourself courses, international exchanges, and the eagerness with which Chinese students strive to practice their English with foreign visitors.

Though any language can have its form of mute speakers (e.g. Mute Polish), the phenomenon of 'Mute English' in China, Japan and Korea is a massive, acknowledged problem, one which the school systems and students are attempting to address.

A related concept is the less-common Deaf English.

== Speech Patterns ==
In places where Mute English seems to be most prominent, the English education is often described as "a communicative language taught as if it were a dead language, like Latin". There is little to no emphasis on developing speaking abilities of the students under the system. As a result, Mute English speakers struggle with piecing together basic sentences despite having gone through roughly eight years' worth of formal English education. Their pronunciation is typically described as "choppy" with a "robotic inflection".

Typically affected by Mute English are countries that use East Asian languages, which belong to various language families while English belongs to the Indo-European Language family. These language families are considered to be very far apart from one another because they all have significant phonetical, semantic and syntactic differences. Hence, to be able to master English, a great amount of effort is required from the learner.

Some of the difficulties Mute English speakers have been observed to have are difficulties with the /rl/ combination of consonants. For example, when they pronounce the word "world", it comes off as sounding more like "word" or "ward". They also tend to struggle with minimal pairs such as /ɛ/ versus /æ/, because these sounds do not exist in their language, so they often have trouble differentiating and pronouncing words that only differ by a minimal pair (i.e. "bet" and "bat").

== Mute English in China ==
In spite of the rising quality and heightened efforts in English education in China, it has not translated into good English proficiency, with many fresh graduates complaining that they were unable to carry out simple communicative functions since the late 1980s even after years of studying English, resulting in 'mute english'.

=== Prominence of English in China ===
Under the new post cultural revolution Chinese leadership, a large pool of English-proficient personnel was deemed to be required for China in securing its access to global scientific and technological advances in propelling towards modernisation. This resulted in a venture to expand the provision and improve the quality of English learning teaching since the 1970s, through a series of reforms carried out in areas such as curriculum development, syllabus design, textbook production, teacher training and pedagogy.

Since the mid-1990s, English has become one of the three core components in China's College Entrance Examinations, known as Gaokao, alongside Chinese and Math. In 2001, the Chinese Ministry of Education launched Chinese-English bilingual education in tertiary institutions to meet the needs of economic globalisation and technical revolution, potentially train competent and multi-talented candidates for the new century, and to further improve the overall quality of higher education in China. Today, millions of Chinese take English proficiency tests every year to secure employment or professional promotion in lines of work that do not necessarily require substantial or any use of English.

As such, English is seen to have a vital role in national and personal development and has a spreading acceptance in the country as the language of prestige, social progress, cultural refinement, and economic development, in which English proficiency is emphasised to be one of the most important and defining characteristics of talent in present-day society.

=== English Pedagogy in China ===
In China, English is considered to be one of the core subjects. Students study it for eight years from elementary through high school. A typical English lesson in China would span four hours a week; three hours for intensive reading and one hour for listening. Occasionally, some teachers will allocate 30 minutes of speaking practice once every two to three weeks. However, a big factor that contributes to the rise of Mute English is the teaching pedagogy of Chinese teachers of the English language. This section will cover some of the major mistakes that teachers make in the classroom or within the Chinese education system.

==== Overuse of Chinese during English lessons ====
In a 2011 study conducted by Yuru Shen, she observed 15 teachers for a month. She noticed that 80% of the teachers used both English and Chinese in their lessons by first speaking in English then translating the instruction or learning material into Chinese. Another 13% of teachers just lectured all the way through in Chinese, only using English to read passages or exercises. Only one teacher used English most of the time and used Chinese only when trying to explain a difficult point to the students to better facilitate their understanding. Furthermore, all informal conversations between student and teacher are held in Chinese. 90% of the teachers observed used a "Grammar Translation" method which inadvertently taught students instead to be able to translate things from Chinese to English. This then does not strengthen the students' foundation or mastery in the language and the main focus of learning English then becomes the mastery of grammar via translation. Consequently, students do not properly learn how to express themselves and instead mistakenly believe that the study of English is the study of translation between English and Chinese. Moreover, 64% of English majors at Leshan Normal University agreed that there was too much use of Chinese during English lessons which could have affected their overall mastery of the language. Therefore, when Chinese is overused in the classroom it undermines a student's ability to learn English in its communicative or expressive form.

==== Lack of native English speakers as teachers ====
The need for native speakers in English is very important because it helps to foster good pronunciation and communicative habits when speaking the language. Furthermore, learners will have a clear point of reference and could potentially mimic the speaker's pronunciation. There are not many native speakers of English in China or even teachers who managed to achieve a native-like fluency in the language. As a result, these teachers struggled to explain basic grammar rules or vocabulary in English. The initial lack of native English speakers in China was due to several deep-seated political sentiments that China had towards the British as the ex-colonisers and the Americans as the new imperialists in the Korean War. Furthermore, students in China are more used to a prescriptivist approach to their education and as a result may not be too receptive to the teaching methodology of native English speakers in explaining rules. These two factors have greatly affected Chinese students' ability to acquire English as a second language.

==== Lack of communicative opportunities ====
In June 2011, a survey on "Hierarchical Teaching" was conducted by the writer and her colleagues in Leshan Normal University. It was between 18 and 20-year-old students who had eight years worth of English education in local Chinese schools. None of these students had ever been to an English-speaking country, nor did they presently have any opportunity to practice English for communicative purposes outside of a school setting. The survey showed that 49.44% of the participants did not get to practice their speaking skills at an individual level. Moreover, as mentioned in the above section about prescriptivism in the Chinese syllabus, there is a very strong focus on test-taking. As such, students are not particularly interested in the workings and communicative aspects of English as a language, but instead are more interested in how their knowledge in English will transfer onto test papers. As such, the focus of English teaching is removed from speaking skills and is instead focused on growing the skills required for written tests. As a result, 94% of students found that the compulsory oral courses were not of use in their future careers. The evident lack of spoken opportunities for English, coupled with no motivation to master English as a language, it is no wonder the spoken proficiency of English in China is generally poor.

==== Deficiency of written tests ====
As mentioned in the above section of lack of communicative opportunities, part of the problem is the test-taking culture in China. As the need for English grew rapidly, companies started to vy for communicatively competent students, putting pressure on schools to produce such talents. This then escalated testing in English. All possible forms of test-taking in China, from elementary school through to university, emphasises on accuracy. These examinations focus on written grammar and vocabulary, neglecting listening and speaking. These tests have been highlighted to affect student's prospective job opportunities and whether or not they can graduate. As such, there is immense pressure from the student to perform during these tests which deviates their focus from English mastery, to just being able to score during examinations. As a result, despite years of formal education in English, the vast majority of these students are unable to express themselves in English.

== Mute English in Japan ==
It is widely known that Japanese people have difficulties in communicating in English, which is seen to be a result from the entrance examination, student's lack of motivation and teachers' insufficient communicative competence in English. Many point to this uncommunicativeness as a source of failure when referring to English language education in Japan. The situation of years of training not translating into an ability to interact with native English speakers beyond surface level causes some dissatisfaction among English teachers and students. On the flip side, in preparing the students for what is required in the entrance exams, the English education is considered more than successful.

Japan ranks 55th out of the 100 countries measured in the 2020 EF English Proficiency Index, overall tallying to 'low proficiency'.

=== Prominence of English in Japan ===
After the conclusion of the Treaty of Peace and Amity with the United States, English language education in Japan started in 1854 and opened up to the West. The popularity of English in Japan today is largely due to Japan's prospering economy, the increased need for foreign language skills and proficiency brought about by industrialisation, as well as favourable attitudes towards the west that were developed during Japan's industrialisation. Fascination with the outside world and desire of internalisation can be seen through the usage of English across advertisements and products in Japan. Over the past decades, there has also been rapid adoption of English loanwords into Japanese, where in some instances differently connotes formality and degree of technicality between Japanese words and the English loanwords.

Today, English enjoys prestige as the top foreign language despite not having a legal status in Japan. The Japanese Ministry of Education has laid down for all middle and high school students to study a foreign language, where in most cases English is the foreign language chosen. The teaching of English in schools is primarily aimed at preparing students for college entrance examinations, where it can be seen to have a crucial role as education and prestige of school is highly valued and a determining factor for vocational success and opportunities.

=== English Pedagogy in Japan ===
Unlike China, Japan is largely considered to be monolingual, but they have consistently included English education in their syllabus. The Japanese study English for 3 years in junior high school, 3 years in high school and at least another 2 years at university, yet until 1999, they have averaged less than 500 for the TOEFL. However, its severe lack of practical application has caused the proliferation of Mute English in the country. Despite the continued efforts, it has even been discovered that Japan's level of English has even decreased. Hence, this section will explore some of the pedagogical and policy mistakes that have resulted in this phenomenon.

==== Insufficient practical training ====
There are fundamental issues with Japan's qualifications of a teacher. Firstly, a Japanese student can obtain a teaching certificate from any public or private university so long as they fulfil the required amount of credits. Hence, candidates can potentially gain a teaching certificate in English at a university without a full-time English faculty. As a result, most prospective teachers do not have in-depth training in the English language, most of these classes they take are literature or linguistics. With only 3% of teachers majoring in English Second Language (ESL)/English Foreign Language (EFL), there is therefore a gap in teaching methodology when it comes to communicative teaching. Moreover, teachers do not have sufficient practical experience when it comes to actually teaching in classrooms, hence they tend to mimic the way that they were taught when they were students. Additionally, in-service teaching training is available for current English teachers, but it is clear that at a national level, it is inconsistently conducted. This is due to the different legislatures from prefecture to prefecture and the presence of privatised Japanese high schools of which these trainings are not available to. As a result, the English education in Japan has suffered due to insufficient practical training.

==== Yakudoku ====
Yakudoku is the most popular teaching methodology of any foreign language in Japan. It stresses the word-by-word translation of English to Japanese. This method is commonly applied to long reading passages because government-approved English texts are usually of higher difficulty than what the student can actually cope with. This is further fuelled by the insufficient training of Japanese English teachers because they usually do not have a strong enough command of English to be able to understand the passage without translations. As a result of this Yakudoku, English lessons in Japan are almost fully conducted Japanese; including grammatical explanations. The only exception is during reading exercises. As such, students do not have any English speaking opportunities in class except for when they repeat after the teacher during reading aloud exercises. This therefore has negatively impacted the speaking ability of Japanese students of the English Language, resulting in the development of Mute English.

==== Issues with standardised testing ====
Like China, Japan's English curriculum is also driven by standardised testing. The Japanese tend to use standardised international tests (TOEFL, TOEIC, Cambridge ESOL, etc.) as their benchmark. There are also internal, in-class testing, called "Jidō Eiken" that is done with younger children while they are still within Japan's education system. "Jidō Eiken" is a test done voluntarily by young pupils, but it is highly popular, attracting over 1.4 million test-takers annually. "Eiken" has other forms of tests for students at higher levels, but they are all done voluntarily. These tests are considered to be one of the most accurate ways to measure English-language proficiency in Japan and affects employment and further education opportunities. As a result, many government and private institutions have used this test as an objective means of measuring a student's English language abilities. Furthermore, these tests are canonically harder than the actual level of English of the examinees which encourages students to study English as a "requirement" rather than as a means of communication. Additionally, despite the "Eiken" having oral tests, examinees must first pass the written and listening parts before qualifying for the oral test. This is bad for communicative learning because there is a lot of emphasis on written and reading proficiency instead which perpetuates the Mute English phenomenon.

== Mute English in South Korea ==
From elementary school to high school, South Korean students spend about 730 hours on English classes at school alongside private tutoring and cram schools, online English classes and even going abroad to improve their English. With the ability of English communicative competence in bringing potential opportunities, office workers voluntarily or involuntarily take up offline or online English classes as well. However, there seems to be no noticeable improvement in South Koreans' communicative competence in English despite efforts and pressure in attaining it. It was noted in 2009 that South Koreans ranked 136th out of 161 nations in speaking skills, with points falling below average in the internet-based test (iBT) of TOEFL.

=== Prominence of English in South Korea ===
After the Korean War in the 1950s, there is a rising demand for English and is currently being taught as the mandatory foreign language at secondary schools. Recognised as a vital tool of competition in society, proficiency in English is required to enter a competitive school, to get a prestigious job, and to be promoted at work. Education in South Korea has been valued for centuries deeply rooted by Confucian attitudes and neoliberal ideologies, with it seen as the most powerful means to achieve upward social mobility and economic prosperity.

In the late 1990s, English listening tests in the entrance examinations were introduced, and later revised to be less grammar-focused and towards a more communicative approach in 1994. This created an increasing competition for English learning and proficiency in order to be academically, thereafter socioeconomically, successful, leading to the boom of English in South Korea. Globalisation was another driving force in the English boom, with the 1997 Korean financial crisis causing Koreans to realise how valued English was in this process.

English has become a symbol of modernisation and globalisation, and is seen as one of the most significant "soft skills" for employment, with the mandatory submission of TOEIC scores for white-collar jobs. As of 2013, the number of TOEIC applicants exceeded 2.07 million in South Korea. Deemed as "a lifelong project for individual excellence", English has become a necessity for Koreans and associated with one's aspirations in enhancing their worth in a competitive society.

A widespread use of English in street signs, brand and government policy names, entertainment, beauty and fashion industries and academia today reflects the positive attitude towards the language. Other ways of usage include borrowing, compounding or deriving of English words, alongside mixing English words with Korean expressions or switching to English.

=== English pedagogy in Korea ===
Amongst these three countries, South Korea first began introducing English into their elementary school curriculum in 1997. In fact, the South Korean government has expressed plans to turn English into the second official language of the country. This would mean plans to implement English-medium instructions and a restructuring of English teaching licensure, but they are still largely considered to be monolingual. However, the issue of Mute English is still incredibly prevalent in Korea. In this section, like the other countries, it will be covering some of the issues in teaching and policies that could have led to the spread of Mute English.

==== Class size ====
In a typical Korean classroom, the class size is roughly 30-37 per class. This is an incredibly large class size as compared to North American English Second Language classes which rarely have more than 20 students per class . As a result, this has fostered a hierarchical student-teacher relationship so that the teacher can better manage the class. Despite South Korea adapting a communicative style of teaching, the large class size has significantly raised students' resistance to class participation, contributing to poor spoken English due to lack of practice. In fact, in a survey conducted by Jeon in 2009, it was found that the greatest stress that teachers experience while teaching English, is the number of students. With a smaller class, teachers can make the lessons more communicative and interactive, which helps to mitigate the effects of Mute English . Presently, Korea is trying to cut their class sizes down to 24 by 2022, but until that happens, Mute English will continue to be a significant issue in Korea.

==== University entrance examinations ====
Korea has a strong test-taking culture to the point that they are even known as "exam hell". Annually, South Koreans spend $752 million on additional support to take English proficiency tests and they are globally regarded as the largest market to take the TOEFL. Furthermore, there is a phenomenon called "jogi yuhak'', where middle to high income parents send their children to English-speaking countries such as the US or Australia to help improve their English. However, these efforts are mainly skewed towards the national university entrance examinations, CSAT, so that their children can enter top-class universities. The English syllabus in Korea is no exception. Centered mainly around the entrance exams, English lessons leave little to no room for oral skills. This is because the entrance exam only assesses a student's reading and listening comprehension abilities. If they do poorly on the English section, it greatly reduces a Korean student's chance of getting into a top university, which continues encouraging them to only focus on what is tested. This therefore perpetuates the Mute English issue because the focus on entrance exams would mean less opportunities to develop speech skills in the classroom.

==== Lack of quality learning materials ====
In a 2009 study by Jeon, she wanted to see what were some of the stresses that English teachers in Korea faced. She found that at every level of education (elementary, middle and high school), teachers ranked supplementing interesting and additional materials for their students were the fourth and fifth most reasons for stress. In general, the teachers felt that the school sanctioned materials for English lessons were neither practical nor interesting. As such, teachers feel the need to produce their own materials to better help their students understand lessons. However, teachers have no time and have no access to supporting material. As such, without improved quality in educational materials, students still continue to have to make do with whatever is given, stagnating their English learning progress.

== Attempts to mitigate Mute English ==
"Mute English" students may display limited pragmatic English knowledge with a highly restricted repertoire of language learning strategies. Schools mainly employ the traditional 'grammar-translation' and 'examination-oriented' method that does not take into consideration pragmatics. This ends up reducing English- learning students into 'mute' and 'deaf' language learners. Students may lack the pragmatic knowledge on the ways to interpret discourse by relating utterances to their meanings, understanding the intention of a speaker, and the way the English language is used in different settings In order to correct Mute English, the approach to teaching English have to transition from language learning to language acquisition.

=== China ===
China employs the use of Foreign English Teachers, fluent in speaking English, to teach English lessons. They primarily work in private language schools or public schools in China, teaching around 20–25 hours a week, with an additional 10–12 hours on average for lesson planning and grading assessments The Foreign English Teachers are certified with TEFL, where the first-time foreign teachers would have to receive 20 hours of ideology training on the Chinese constitution and regulations.

=== Japan ===
==== Earlier Mandatory English Education ====
From education year 2020 onwards, English teaching is mandatory from elementary school onwards. Students in the third and fourth grades go through "foreign language activities" for 35 hours per year, about one or two lessons per week, to learn the basics of English language. Fifth- and sixth-graders will study the language for 70 hours a year to achieve the goal of reading, writing, comprehending and speaking English properly with a vocabulary estimated to be around 600 to 700 words.

==== Teaching English in English ====
English classes will deviate from the norm of being taught in Japanese, with new reforms mandating the language of teaching English to be English itself as a basic rule. In 1994, Oral Communication, a subject consisting of three courses: listening, speaking and discussion/debate, was introduced as a subject and implemented across many high schools. This allows the high school students to place emphasis on the practical usage of the English language, rather than learning the English language for academic achievements only.

==== Japan Exchange and Teaching (JET) Programme ====
The JET programme is a Japanese Government initiative which brings native English speaking Assistant Language Teachers (ALTs) to Japan to assist public school English classes. In 2019, there were 5,234 participating ALTs from 57 countries.

==== New Standardised University Entrance Exam ====
Starting 2020, private testers will take over English assessments such as the TOEFL and TOEIC, as universities are requiring students to attain certain scores in such private tests.

=== South Korea ===
Since introducing English education into the curriculum in 1997, there have been several improvements made to improve the quality of English from year 2000 onwards namely, emphasizing communicative language in teaching and testing, emphasizing performance assessment as part of language testing, and teaching English in English.

==== National English Competence Assessment Test ====
The Korean Ministry of Education, Science and Technology (MEST) developed and officially accredited the National English Competence Assessment Test from 2010 onwards, assessing all four skills of listening, reading, speaking and writing. There are three levels aimed to achieve different goals, namely:

- Level 1 (Highest Level): For college sophomores and juniors, for usage after graduation, application of jobs and for overseas education (to replace TOEIC and TOEFL).
- Level 2: For college departments that uses English
- Level 3: Level required for general college education

The test will be mainly online.

==== Increasing Class Hours in Elementary School ====
English class hours of elementary school students will increase by one hour per week to improve their English abilities. Students in the third and fourth grades go through 2 hours of English lesson per week, while fifth- and sixth-graders go through 3 hours of English lessons per week. The increased exposure and time spent on learning English aims to enhance and expedite the student's English learning progress.

==== Jogiyuhak ====
Jogiyuhak or jogi yuhak (early study abroad) is the educational and linguistic investment that many Korean families take part in, in order to achieve good English standards - a native-like fluency and accent. Families would migrate with the intention of submersion in an English monolingual environment among native speakers to access better quality of English education in an English-speaking environment to hone the child's English fluency skills from young.

==== English Villages ====
English Villages in South Korea provide a short-term immersion English experience in a live-in environment to promote English learning and to build students' Anglo-American cultural awareness. The first English village was opened in August 2004 in Ansan, Gyeonggi-do province. Additional English villages have been opened in both Gyeonggi-do and Seoul. As of September 2012, there are 32 of such mini towns in suburban areas.

English villages employ a mixture of foreign native speakers of English and fluent English-speaking Korean staff. They are intended to help students face the particular challenges of speaking English in the Korean context. Many families seek to improve their children's English ability by sending them to several expensive after-school programs and by sending them to study abroad in English-speaking countries. Study abroad results in a substantial amount of money leaving the country. The English villages are intended to reduce this loss, and make the immersion experience accessible to students from low-income families as well. However, many questions remain as to whether the English villages will be cost-effective. In fact, most have been privatized due to operating losses.

The English village concept is to be expanded in the near future as financially it has not been a complete failure. The government will begin to use money for projects like this in the future in addition to sending students on scholarships overseas, despite spending money on short term construction projects.

There are several English Villages in different areas in Korea, namely, the Gyeonggi-do English Village, the Ansan English Village on Daebu Island on the coast of the Yellow Sea, and the Seoul English Village.

== See also ==
- Second language acquisition
- Chinglish
- English Education in China

== Sources ==
- Mao, Luming; Min, Yue (2004). "Foreign Language Education in the PRC". Language Policy in the People's Republic of China. Vol. 4. pp. 319–329. doi:10.1007/1-4020-8039-5_18. ISBN 1-4020-8038-7.
- Stevens, Gillian; Jin, Kinam; Song, Hyun Jong (March 2006). "Short-term Migration and the Acquisition of a World Language". International Migration. 44 (1): 167–180. doi:10.1111/j.1468-2435.2006.00359.x.
- 董洪亮. "莫学'哑巴英语'" [Don't learn 'dumb English'] (in Chinese). Archived from the original on 16 October 2012.
- Fang, Guo (2003). "A Comparison Between Online English Language Teaching and Classroom English Language Teaching". Archived from the original on 27 February 2007.
