= English education in China =

Revolution of education of English language in China

The emphasis on English-language education in the People's Republic of China only emerged after 1979, three years after the end of Cultural Revolution, when China adopted the reform and opening up policy, and the United States and China established strong diplomatic ties. One estimate (in 2007) put the number of English speakers in China at over 200 million and rising, with 50 million secondary school pupils now studying the language.

However, online test score data from the 2018 EF English Proficiency Index rank the nation 47th out of the 88 countries measured, with an overall score of "Low proficiency." It suggested that Internet users in economically developed cities and provinces such as Shanghai, Beijing, Tianjin, and Jiangsu generally had a decent command of the language, while those in other areas were limited to basic vocabulary. A 2017 article from The Telegraph also suggests that fewer than 1 percent of people in China (approximately 10 million) speak English conversationally.

According to a China Daily report, many Chinese students begin learning English in kindergarten before starting formal schooling. Most schoolchildren receive their first English lessons in the third grade of primary school, at the age of 8 or 9. English language teaching in China has been criticised for focusing primarily on the skills tested in national examinations. This approach has resulted in a strong emphasis on the memorisation of grammar rules and vocabulary. Ma and Kelly note that the Grammar-Translation and Audio-Lingual methods—which had already been largely rejected as fundamentally flawed by Western educationalists and linguists—aligned well with traditional Chinese learning practices and the exam-oriented education system, and were therefore widely adopted.

== History ==
China's first contact with the English language came through Chinese and English traders, and the first missionary schools to teach English were established in Macau in the 1630s. In the 19th century, after frequent contacts with English traders, several handbooks for teaching English to local merchants were published in Guangzhou. From the late 1840s, English became popular and was widely used in Shanghai, leading to the publication of books to teach the language to local residents. Between 1911 and 1949, English was taught in missionary schools and thirteen Christian colleges.

After the founding of the People's Republic of China in 1949, Russian was originally the primary foreign language. English began to transition into the education system during the 1960s as a result of the Sino-Soviet split. Because of the condemnation of the English language during the Cultural Revolution, English education did not return until Richard Nixon visited China in 1972. Until the end of the Cultural Revolution in 1976 and the restoration of the Gaokao in 1977, the major textbooks used for English instruction in China were translations of Mao Zedong's works. These textbooks were of poor quality, filled with political jargon such as "Never forget class struggle!" or "Young educated people must go to the countryside for re-education!", and lacked any up-to-date information on language learning or teaching methods.

In 1978 about 500,000 people in China were subscribed to the magazine Learning English, and in 1982 the BBC program Follow Me had about 10 million households in China as viewers. Once China established the reform and opening up policy under Deng Xiaoping, the popularity of English and other languages began to thrive. English became very popular between the late 1970s to 1990s in areas that dealt with trading and tourism.

In the 2010s, the weighting of the English component of the gaokao was reduced. Some academics have attributed this with Chinese Communist Party's increased emphasis on "patriotic education" and its desire to reduce the soft power of the English language. In 2021, journalist Li Yuan (Chinese: 袁莉; pinyin: Yuán Lì) in The New York Times wrote that there was a trend countering English language education in China. According to EF Education First, China's ranking in English proficiency fell from "moderate" to "low" in the early 2020s.

== Testing ==
The College English Test (CET) is the primary English language test in China. As of 2011, employers have made scores in the CET 4 and CET 6 requirements for employment, and The Lowdown on China's Higher Education stated that in China "CET 4 and CET 6 National English examinations have become the symbol of English proficiency in reading and writing."

There is also the Public English Test System (PETS).

== Hospitality industry ==
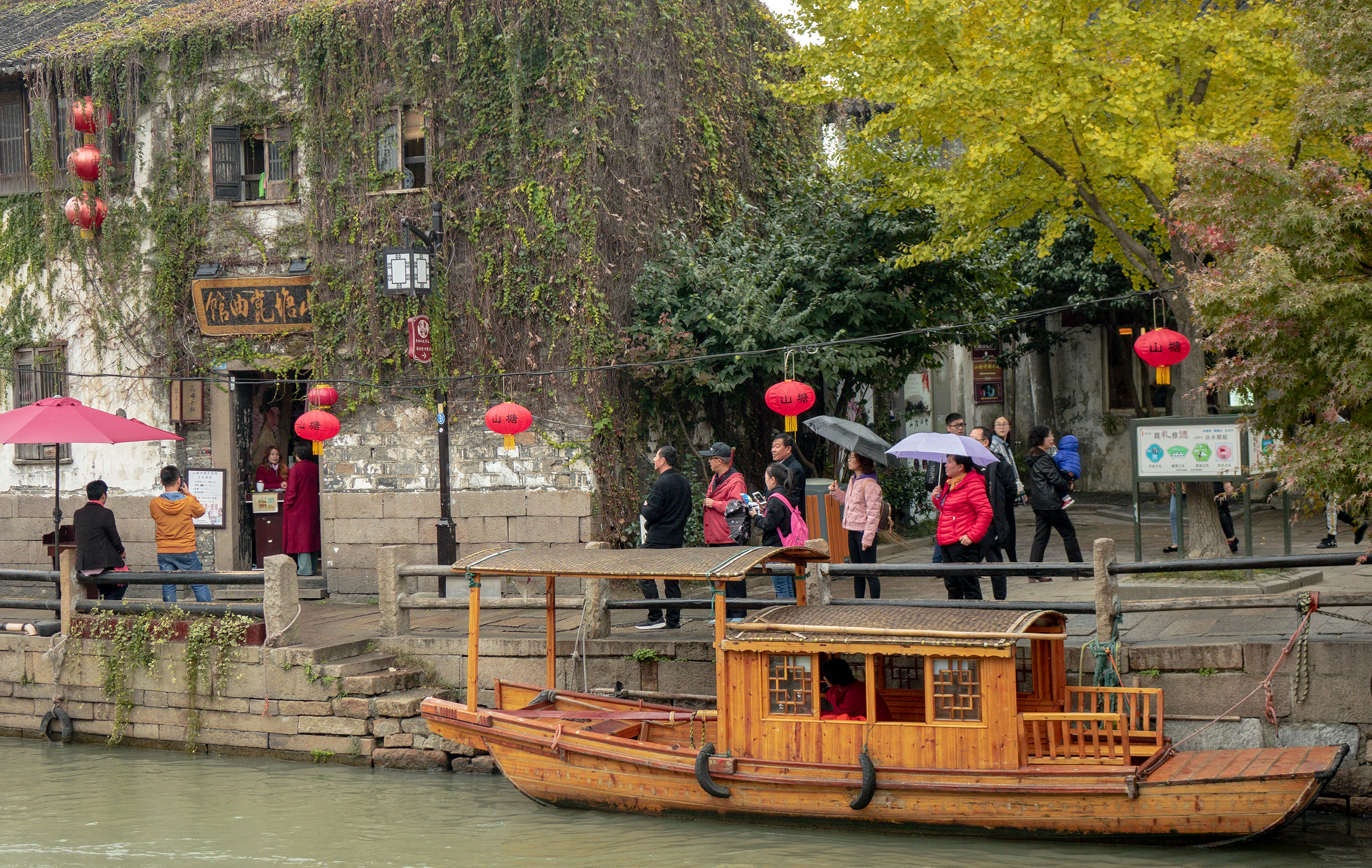
Grand Canal tour boat, Suzhou

Tourism in China is a major industry, producing 11.04% of the GDP and contributing direct and indirect employment of up to 28.25 million people. Nonetheless, not many employees in the hospitality sector speak English. One source indicates that it's more common in premium-grade hotels "while less expensive hotels might have few or no staff members who speak English". Bilingual guide services are readily available, however.

== Online English education ==
Recently, online education has become a choice for English learners in China, including online one on one English education. Chinese online education companies are known to source teachers from English-speaking countries.

== See also ==
- Teaching English as a foreign language
- English-medium education
- Web International English - A former chain of English education centers
- EMI schools - English medium schools in Hong Kong
- Esperanto in China
- Chinglish

== Notes ==
- Some content originates from Education in China
