= Official Cantonese translations of English names for British officials =

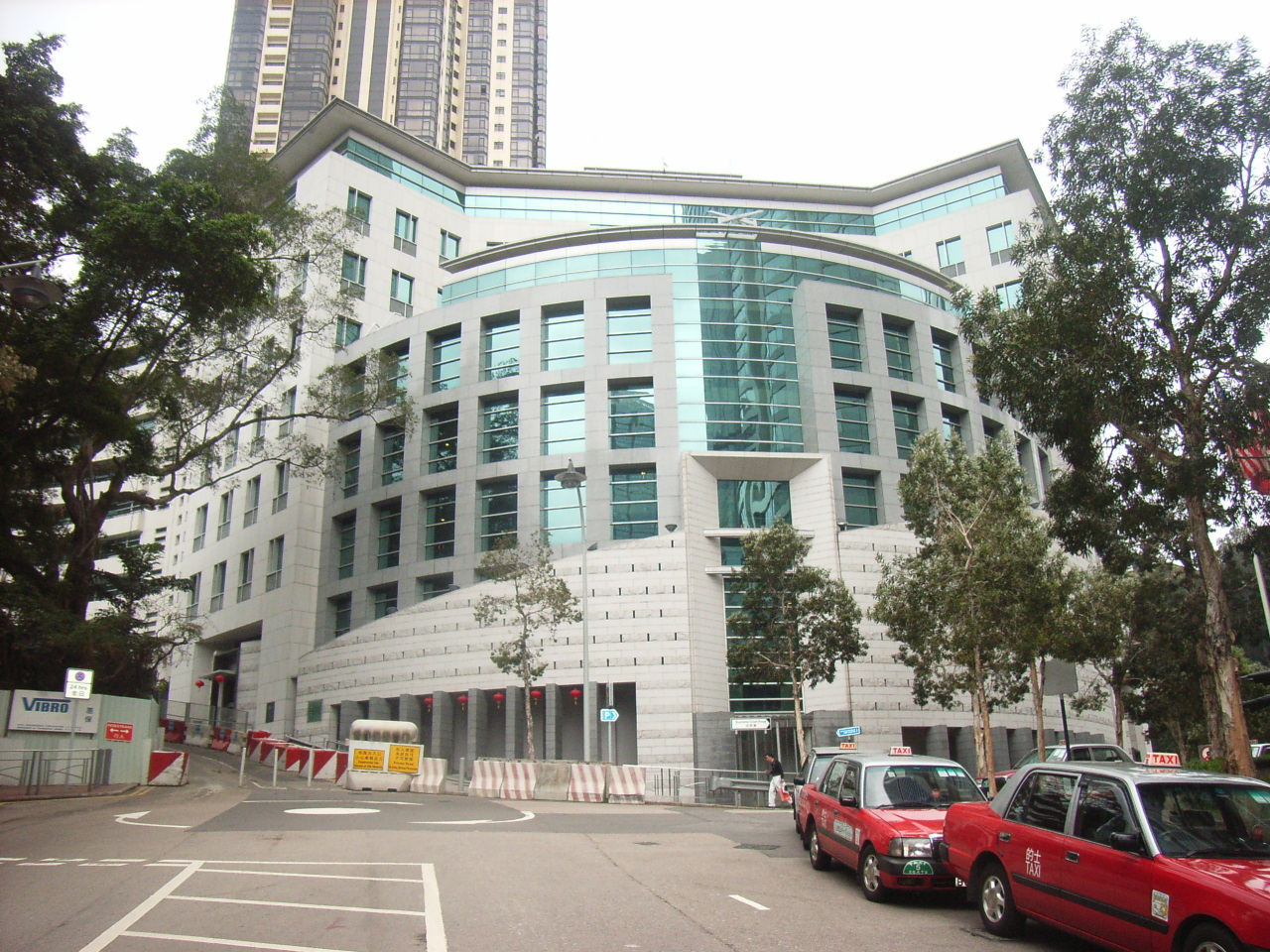
British Consulate General Hong Kong

The British Consulate General Hong Kong is the sole governmental agency currently tasked with offering professional formal English-to-Cantonese name translation services to British officials. No similar services are offered by UK diplomatic missions within the Greater China area.

The practice has its origin in the aftermath of the distasteful translation of the name of colonial governor Edward Stubbs, which has since evolved into a long-standing tradition for the British government to provide such translations for cabinet members and other officials. The translation process follows a set of principles to avoid taboo, undesirable, or embarrassing translations, as well to make translated names more relatable, approachable, and agreeable to Hongkongers.

These translated names are widely adopted and used by Cantonese media outlets in Hong Kong and Macau as well as their foreign correspondents and bureaus, which spread these names to Cantonese-speaking expatriate communities including Australia, Canada, the United Kingdom and the United States.

== Background ==
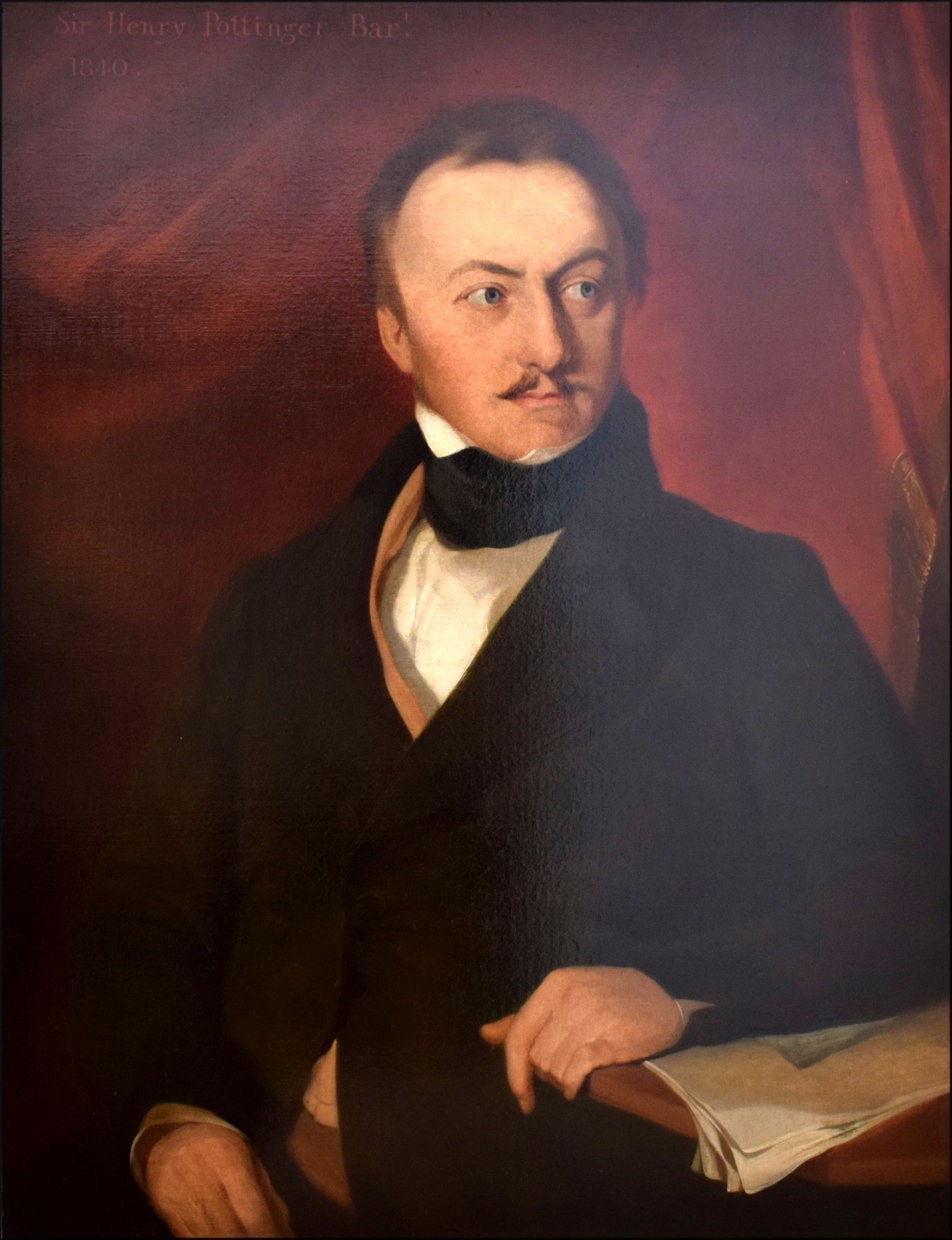
The name of Henry Pottinger was initially translated into one that meant "a nutter brews tea"

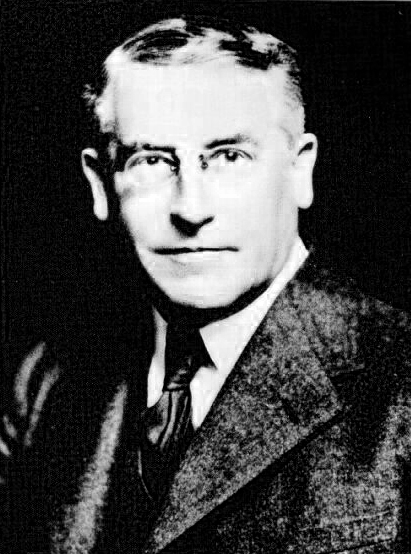
Edward Stubbs's original Cantonese name has a literal meaning of "history; a tower; a vassal"

It was not uncommon for British officials to be given translation of their names in history. Before getting a new translation, the name of the very first Hong Kong colonial governor, Henry Pottinger, was originally translated as 煲顛茶 or Bōu Dīn Chàh in Cantonese which phonetically rhymes with his family name Pottinger but literally means "to brew crazy tea" or implies "a nutter brews tea". Some of these degrading translations have survived into modern times: Lord William Napier and Sir Edward Belcher had their names translated into 律勞卑 or Leuht Lòuh Bēi and 卑路乍 or Bēi Louh Ja respectively, and both have multiple demeaning literal meaning or rhyming elements to it, such as "to discipline the servant inferior" for the former or "an inferior road for the cunning" for the latter.

The 16th Governor of Hong Kong, Sir Reginald Stubbs, was first given a particularly distasteful Cantonese translation for his name. 史塔士 or Sí Taap Sí was the original Cantonese translation, literally meaning "history; a tower; a vassal". However, the first and the third characters of 史 and 士 share the same archaic pronunciation of the character 死 (sí), meaning "to die", and more troublesomely, the same pronunciation of the character 屎 (sí), meaning "shit". Also, Cantonese speakers sometimes call a toilet bowl 屎塔 (sí taap), being homophones to the first two characters of his newly translated name. Thus, Stubbs's first Cantonese name translation rendered a wide variety of somewhat unpalatable translations and interpretations, like "toilet bowl's shit", "shit tower's death" etc.

Stubbs, as a result, became the very first governor given a formal Cantonese name translation, 司徒拔 or Sī Tòuh Baht. For native English speakers, 司 (sī) may still sound very much the same as 屎 (sí), but as the two different tone marks show, they are different. This difference in tones changes a lot in the meanings, given the fact that Cantonese is a tonal language. And at the same time, Stubbs believed having an authentically translated name would create an approachable image and help the colonial government build a closer relationship with ethnically Chinese Hongkongers and indigenous villagers. A new governmental tradition of English-to-Cantonese name translation for British officials was thus born.

== Translation service ==
Prior to Hong Kong's sovereignty transfer in 1997, it was the joint effort of the Chinese Language Division of the colonial Chief Secretary's Office and the British Trade Commission in Hong Kong to come up with seemly name translations for British officials. It is now the responsibility of the Hong Kong British Consulate-General, and they usually supply the press with a list of translated names when there is a new cabinet.

== General guidelines ==
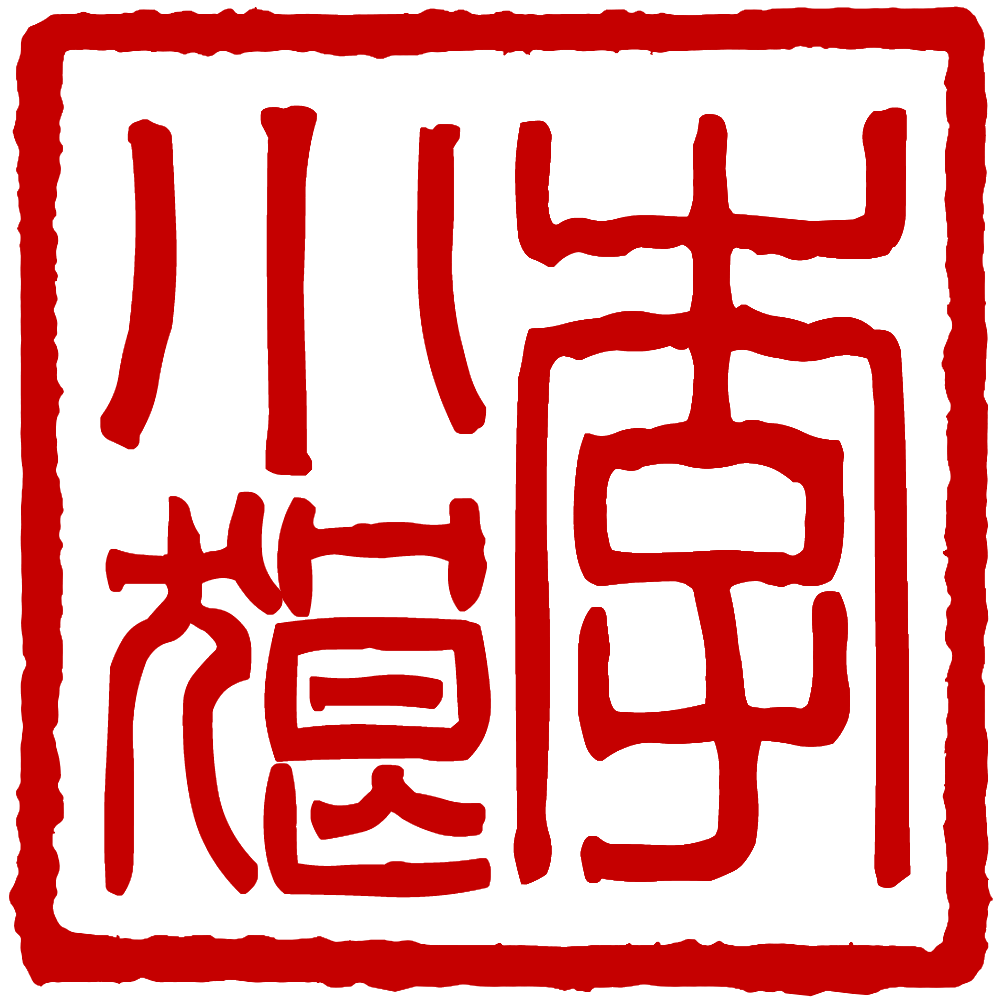
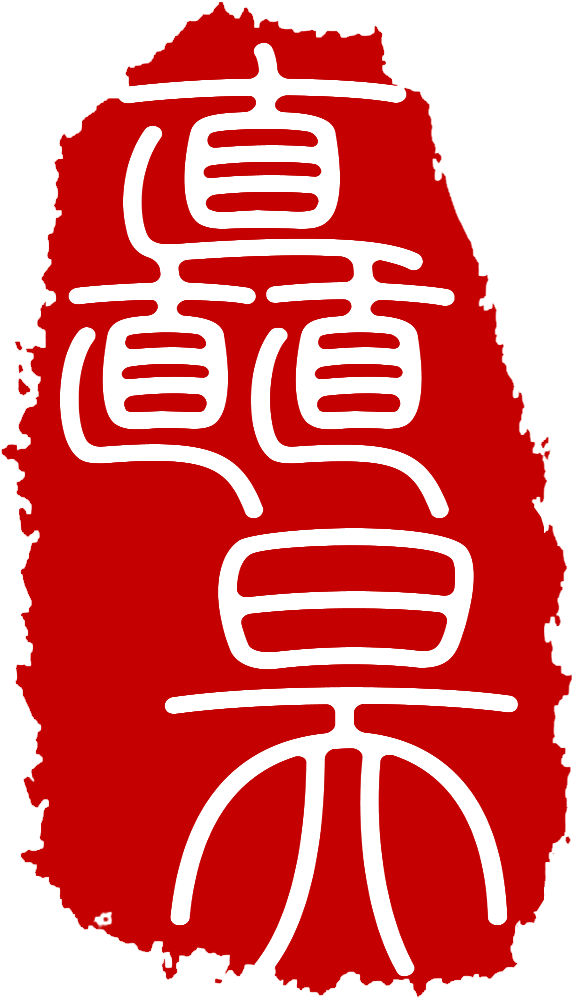
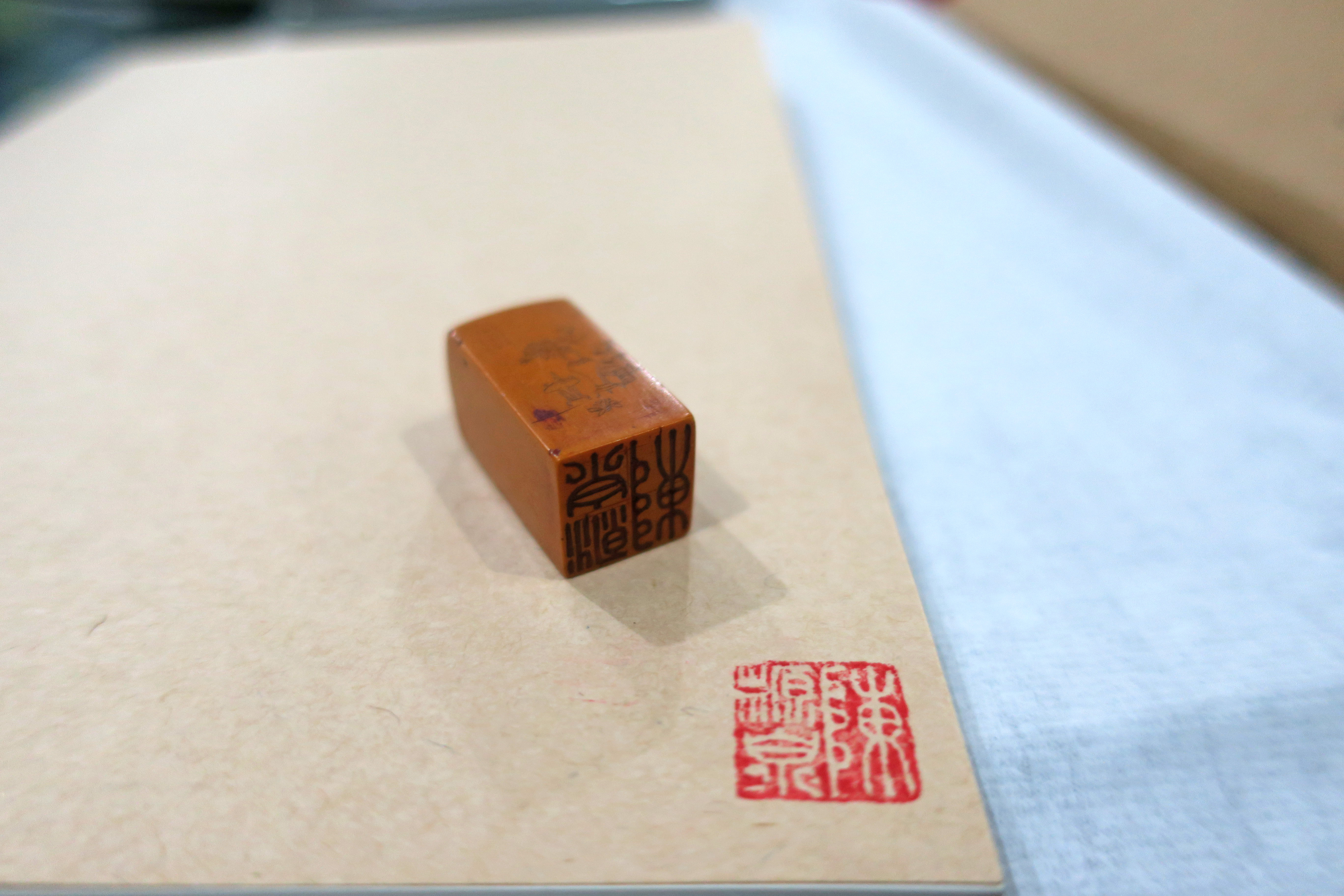
East Asian Chops

The early translation method mainly focused on phonetic or homophonic translation of an official's family name. As the system matured, the official's given names started having a role to play. The translation process has become very sophisticated in modern times. There is a considerable emphasis on localisation and domestication instead of phonetic imitation of the English pronunciation. Furthermore, matters that are culturally only significant to local Hongkongers, especially for the middle-to-upper class, but not so much to foreigners, like aesthetic values of different calligraphic styles of the characters on an East Asian seal or chop, divinatory feng-shui and suan-ming assessment of the character total stroke count, etc. are all part of the translation service.

The Consulate-General has revealed some general guidelines that they now follow for the process:

- Cantonese should be taken as the target language, as most Hongkongers speak Cantonese. The translated name should be as indistinguishable from locals' names as possible so that ethnically Chinese Hongkongers find it relatable.
- English pronunciation should be taken as the basis and then look for homophonic Cantonese characters. Stressed syllables of the English name should be considered first.
- Family name in a translated name should come first and given names to follow, to match the Cantonese convention. For Prime Minister Theresa May, her surname is translated into 文 or Màhn, her first name is translated into 翠珊 or Cheui Sāan. The full Cantonese name is therefore 文翠珊.
- Common Cantonese family names should be used when possible. The translated given names should be pleasant to the ear, divinatorily auspicious, and with decent meanings and metaphors. When the colonial government was trying to provide the former Governor Patten's wife Lavender with a Cantonese name, all the options were given divinatory suan-ming assessment of the character total stroke count. She ultimately settled on a common family name 林 and given names 穎彤 or Làhm Wihng Tùhng in whole, meaning “a forest” for 林, “intelligent” for 穎, “scarlet” for 彤, and in all denoting an outstanding, clever, and beautiful lady. As for Theresa May, her Cantonese name 文翠珊 carries the meaning of "refined; jade; coral".
- A three-character name is usually adopted. Ignore the official's English given names if that individual's English family name is enough to provide for a meaningful three-character Cantonese name. Then-Chancellor Philip Hammond's family name was enough to provide for 夏文達 or Hah Màhn Daaht.
- Names that sound similar to public figures in Hong Kong are generally avoided. The Consulate originally planned to name then-Chancellor Rachel Reeves as Lee Wai-ching (李慧晴). Since the name sounded similar to the Hong Kong Legislative Council member Lee Wai-king, she was ultimately named Lee Wan-ching (李韻晴).

== Reception ==
This practice of providing comprehensive official name translation services has never been extended to Mandarin or to other UK diplomatic missions out of Hong Kong in the Greater China region. As such, places where Mandarin is their official language usually have different Mandarin-translated names for British officials. The Mandarin-translated names do not only differ from their Cantonese counterparts but also among Mandarin-speaking regions, e.g. between Mainland China and Taiwan. Also, these name translations are not used by Chinese state-owned media in Hong Kong, e.g. Ta Kung Pao and Wen Wei Po. Instead, they use names following standards of Mainland state media.

For instance, Hong Kong media observe the Cantonese name translated by the Consulate-General and call former Prime Minister Theresa May 文翠珊 or Màhn Cheui Sāan, meaning "refined". She is known as 梅伊 or Méi Yī in Mandarin in Taiwan, meaning "a Chinese plum" for 梅 and "that" (a pronoun) for 伊. However, the Chinese Xinhua News Agency, being the official standard setter of name translation in China and known to have declined to accept the US government's suggested name translation for former President Obama, calls Theresa May 特雷莎．梅 or Tè Léi Shā Méi, literally meaning "special" for 特, "thunder" for 雷, "sedge" for 莎, and "a Chinese plum" for 梅. This is a phonetic translation that preserves the English name structure.

Hongkongers are generally concerned with having good names, as embodied in the Cantonese proverb of 唔怕生壞命，最怕改壞名 (fear not born to be unlucky, but fear most for giving one a bad name), which shares some similarities with the Latin idea of nomen est omen. It is thus not unusual to hear stories about adults in Hong Kong in their 30s or 40s changing their names after consulting with feng-shui and suan-ming practitioners in the hope of improving various aspects of their lives. Hong Kong parents of newborns are just as concerned, if not more so. Against this cultural backdrop, the Cantonese-translated names prepared by the Consulate-General are generally very well received and often praised by the Hong Kong public, as well as some Mandarin-speaking commentators in Taiwan.

== Exceptions ==
Although it is the usual practice that the Consulate-General provides a new cabinet with Cantonese-translated names, individual officials may still turn down such suggestions and opt for Mandarin-translated names instead, and they occasionally do. When this happens, Hong Kong mainstream media usually adopt the Mandarin-translated names, but some members of the Hong Kong public may frown upon these names. For instance, David Cameron was offered 甘民樂 or Gām Màhn Lohk as his Cantonese name by Consulate-General when he became Prime Minister in 2010, meaning "willingly; people; joy" and signifying that he had "the will to make the people happy". Instead, Cameron chose to forgo the offer and decided to stick to the Mandarin-translated name 卡梅倫 as his official name, meaning "to get stuck; a Chinese plum; ethics", which had already been in use by Chinese media and some Hong Kong media as well. It was later reported that he thought not taking up a new Cantonese name would save some hassle for the media in Hong Kong. However, quite a few of the Hong Kong public held negative views towards his Mandarin-translated name, especially when previous British officials, like Chris Patten, the final Governor of Hong Kong, had adopted a new Cantonese-translated name despite having an existing Mandarin-translated name. Some in Hong Kong continued to find Cameron's Mandarin-translated name objectionable until his resignation in 2016. He was even made fun of having probably been destined to have his premiership cut short because of "having a wrong name".

Apart from Cameron, the Cantonese-translated names of the then-Deputy Prime Minister Nick Clegg was also not used by the media. The Cantonese name was 紀理歷 or Géi Léih Lihk, meaning "epoch; to manage; history" and where the given name 理歷 happens to be homophones of “résumé” 履歷 or léih lihk, signifying a leader with years of management experience. The Mandarin translation 克莱格 or Kè Lái Gé prevailed, where the character 克 is the simplified character of 剋 that means "to defeat" with an ominous connotation in feng-shui in certain situations. The Cantonese name was revived years after him leaving the government.

Another Prime Minister Boris Johnson was referred to by Hong Kong media as 约翰逊 or Yuē Hàn Xùn, the common Mandarin translation deployed for the name Johnson. The Consulate suggested 莊漢生 or Jōng Hon Sāng, which would have meant "solemn; man to grow; to develop" and implying a solemn leader for growth and development. It was reported that he neither accepted nor rejected the Consulate-General's suggestion. As a result of the non-adoption of a Cantonese name for Boris Johnson, his brother Jo Johnson was named by the Consulate-General as "約翰森" or Yuē Hàn Sēn, using the Mandarin translation, with the brothers sharing the first two characters "約翰" (John) to suggest their relationship.
