= College English Test =

Chinese college exam

The College English Test (Chinese: 全国大学英语四、六级考试), better known as CET, is a national English as a foreign language test in the People's Republic of China. It examines the English proficiency of undergraduate and postgraduate students in China. It is meant to ensure that Chinese undergraduates and postgraduates reach the required English levels specified in the National College English Teaching Syllabuses (NCETS). This test has existed in China for 26 years and now 18 million people take it annually. It includes two levels, CET4 (四级) and CET6 (六级), and prefers American English.

Another kind of national English as a foreign language test is Test for English Majors (Chinese: 全国高等学校英语专业四、八级考试), better known as TEM. It includes two levels—TEM4 (四级) and TEM8 (八级).

== College English Test ==
Generally, all non-English-major university students are allowed to take the College English Test.

=== Before 2005 reform ===
Before the 2005 reform, the maximum score was 100 points. A test score higher than 85 is graded as "Excellent", and a test score higher than 60 but below 85 is graded as "Pass" in the certificate. This test was held nationally twice a year in summer and winter. The CET consisted of the non-English-specialized "Band 4" (CET4), in which certificate-holders have reached the English level of non-English major undergraduate students, and "Band 6" (CET6), in which the certificate-holders have reached the English level of non-English major postgraduates. The test included listening, reading and writing sections. The spoken test was optional.

=== 2005 reform ===
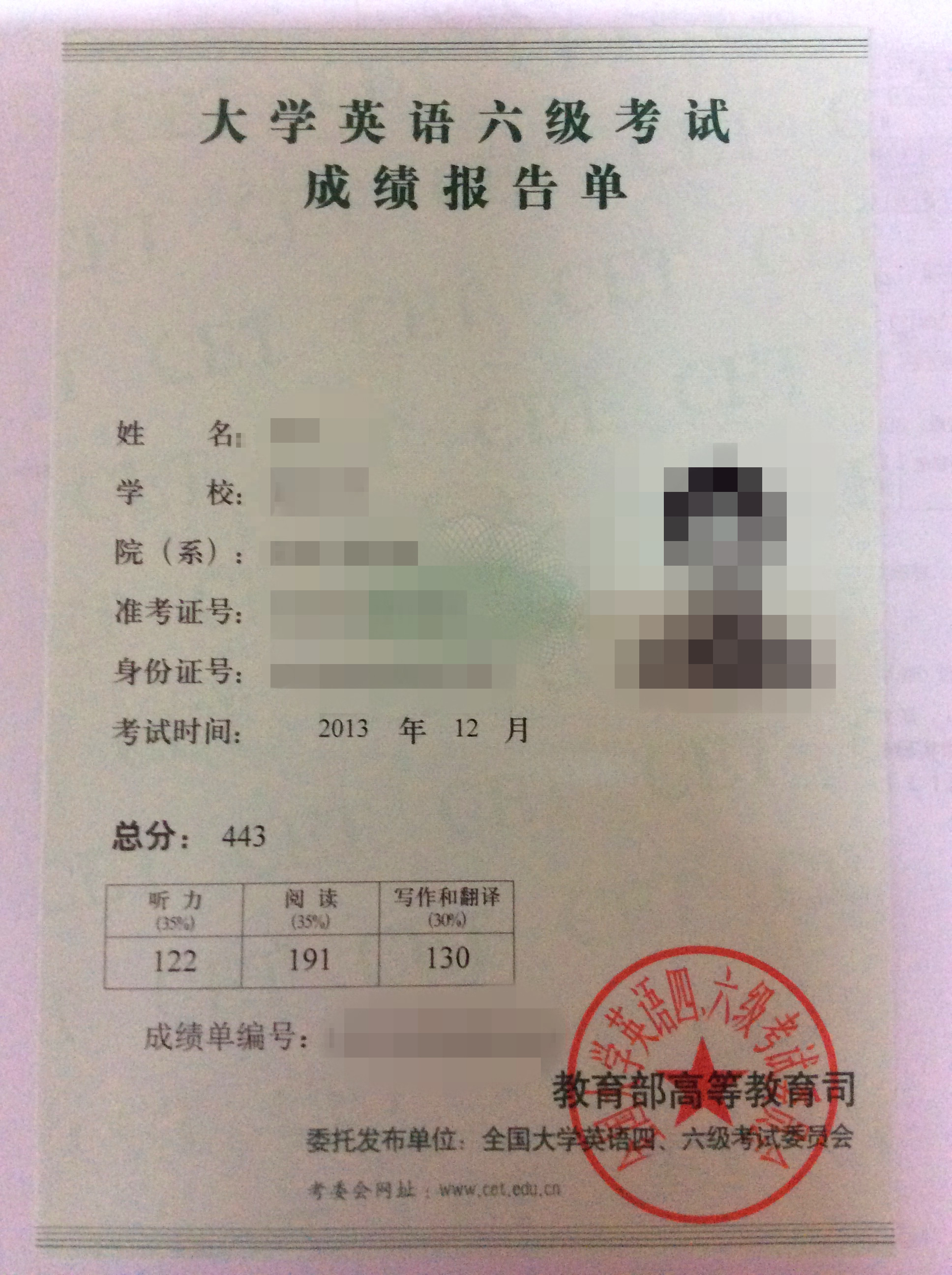
CET-6 Score Report for non-English-Major students

The CET was reformed in 2005. Several changes were made, including:

- Re-ordered and re-organized sections; more listening and spoken sections; new "Skimming & Scanning" and "Translation" sections;
- New grading system: scores are graded on a curved scale, so that the highest score possible is 710, while the lowest mark is a score of 290 (finish all questions but all wrong);
- Passing grades and qualification certificate elimination;
- A more detailed score report on each section;
- Public service elimination: only university students need to take the test.

The CET-4 is important for university students in China who are not English majors. It is not a prerequisite for a bachelor's degree but some universities in China require students get 425 scores in CET4 to get the degree. Many postgraduate universities also require CET4 at least 425 or CET6 at least 425. In some universities, if students want to get the qualification to be enrolled as a master student without an exam (Bishi), that is to say, he or she can Baoyan, they should get CET6 certification. Many employers in China prefer applicants with CET-4 or even CET-6 certification.

Passing the CET is important for Chinese college students. Graduates may only be able to get a degree or a good job if they can pass the CET with a high score.

While the CET tests reading, writing and listening, it does have a separate test for speaking. The speaking test is held twice a year and only students with a CET Band-4 score higher than 550 or a CET Band-6 higher than 485 are eligible for the test.

== Test for English Majors ==
A similar but more rigorous test, the Test for English Majors (TEM), is mandatory for English majors, and it is generally only for English majors. For these students, passing the TEM-4 is a graduation requirement. The test should be taken by the end of the second academic or sophomore year. TEM-8 ("Band 8") is the highest level for English major students; it should be taken during the end of the last academic or senior year.

If an English-major student fails to pass the TEM-4 during their sophomore year, they may attempt to pass the TEM-8 during their senior year. Those failing the TEM-8 are only allowed one re-test (during the following year after they have graduated from college). A second failure results in lifelong disqualification.

Both TEM4 and TEM8 are the only two lifelong qualifications for any student.

== Vocabulary requirements ==
=== CET series ===
- CET-4: 4500 words
- CET-6: 6500 words

=== TEM series ===
- TEM-4: 8000 words
- TEM-8: 13000 words

== Social consequences ==
Some Chinese researchers point out the positive social consequences of the CET as it has promoted the role of English teaching and learning at the tertiary level in China over its 20-year history. At the same time, other researchers challenge the CET by pointing out that the test does not assess communicative competence as the teaching syllabus requires. Before the recent reform of the CET, the large proportion of multiple choice questions made this test an efficient one, but possible sacrifices in accurately measuring English language ability remained a concern. Since the CET certificates had been one of the graduation requirements of undergraduates in the majority of Chinese universities for almost 20 years, test-oriented teaching was another severe problem. However, changes made in the CET test content, format, and scoring systems are evidence of the endeavors to bring about positive washback of the test on English teaching and learning in China. It is the expectation of the CET committee that the test can reflect and catch up with the needs of rapid economic reform and the new open-door policy.

== Exam score distributions ==
Answering all questions incorrectly will result in 330, the lowest score a test taker can get in CET4. By contrast, receiving a score higher than 600 is usually regarded as "perfect" and that means the test taker has not only answered most multiple choice questions correctly but also received positive feedback on their performance in the writing section.

330	350	370	390	410	430	450	470	490	510	530	550	570	590	610	630	650+
1%	2%	4%	7%	11%	17%	25%	34%	44%	55%	65%	74%	83%	90%	95%	98%	99%

== See also ==
- National College Entrance Examination
- English education in China
- Education in the People's Republic of China
- Teaching English as a foreign language
- Public English Test System
