= Yuhuatai Memorial Park of Revolutionary Martyrs =

Public feature in Nanjing, Jiangsu Province, China

Coordinates: 32.0038°N 118.7792°E

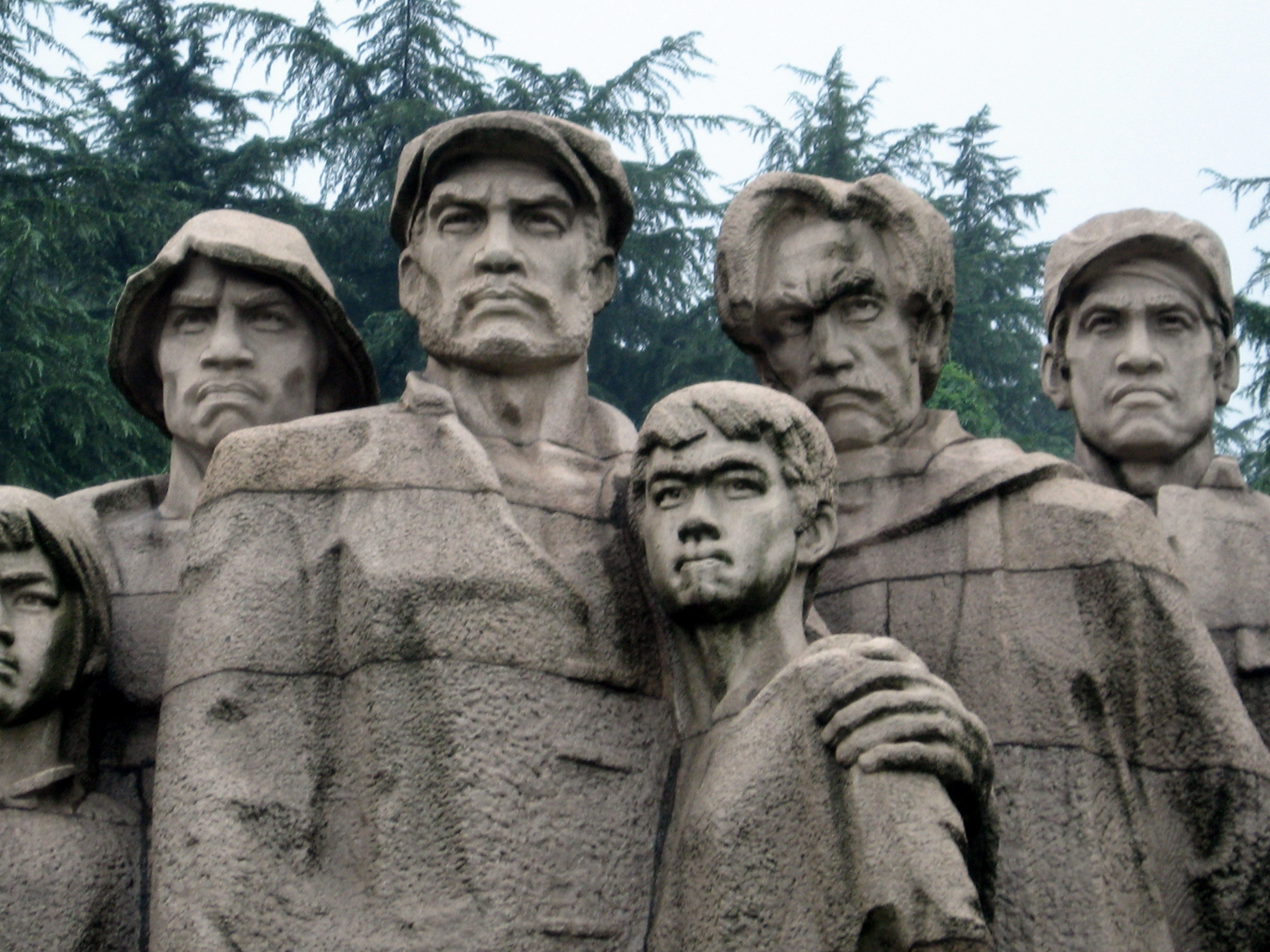

Yuhuatai Memorial Park of Revolutionary Martyrs (雨花台烈士陵园) is a park and tourist site in the Yuhuatai District of Nanjing, Jiangsu Province, China. The name Yuhuatai comes from yu (rain), hua (flower), tai (platform). A prominent feature of the park is a statue of nine figures. The statue commemorates the Chinese Communist Party members killed by the Kuomintang.

== History ==
During the Republic of China period, Yuhuatai was used as a torture chamber where over thousands of communists were executed, including Deng Zhongxia. In 1940, after the establishment of the Wang Jingwei regime, some agents of Bureau of Investigation and Statistics were also killed in Yuhuatai. After the end of the Second Sino-Japanese War, many Japanese war criminals were executed there.

After the founding of the People's Republic of China, Yuhuatai was set up as a mausoleum of revolutionary martyrs, planting trees, building roads in 1950. Then in 1970, the Nanjing Government built the 10 meter-high North Martyrdom and 14 meter-long group of martyrs sculpture there. In 1984, the local government built a memorial hall in the southern part of the mausoleum and a 42-meter-high monument on the summit of the main peak. In 1988, Yuhuatai was included in the third batch of National Key Cultural Relic Protection Unit.

In 2010, Yuhuatai Martyrs' Memorial Museum added Zhu Chi, Hua Pinzhang, Han Xianyuan and Gao Zhisong, four generals of the National Revolutionary Army who sacrificed their lives in the Battle of Yuhua in the Battle of Nanking in the Second Sino-Japanese War.

=== Executed Japanese War Criminals ===
The following is a list of Japanese war criminals of World War II who were executed at Yuhuatai:

- Takashi Sakai (酒井隆): Supreme Governor of the Hong Kong War Office.
- Junichi Tanaka (田中軍吉): Squadron Leader of the Sixth Division of the Japanese Invasion Dispatch Army.
- Toshiaki Mukai (向井敏明): Second Lieutenant of the Ninth Division of the 16th Japanese Invasion Dispatch Corps.
- Tsuyoshi Noda (野田毅): Second Lieutenant of the Ninth Wing of the 16th Division of the Japanese Invasion Forces.
- Hisao Tani (谷寿夫): Lieutenant General of the Imperial Japanese Army, the person mainly responsible for the Nanjing Massacre.
- Mitsuyoshi Tsurumaru (鶴丸光吉): a member of the Kyushu Kokura Kempeitai of the Imperial Japanese Army, responsible for the massacre of non-military personnel during the Nanjing Massacre.

== Gallery ==
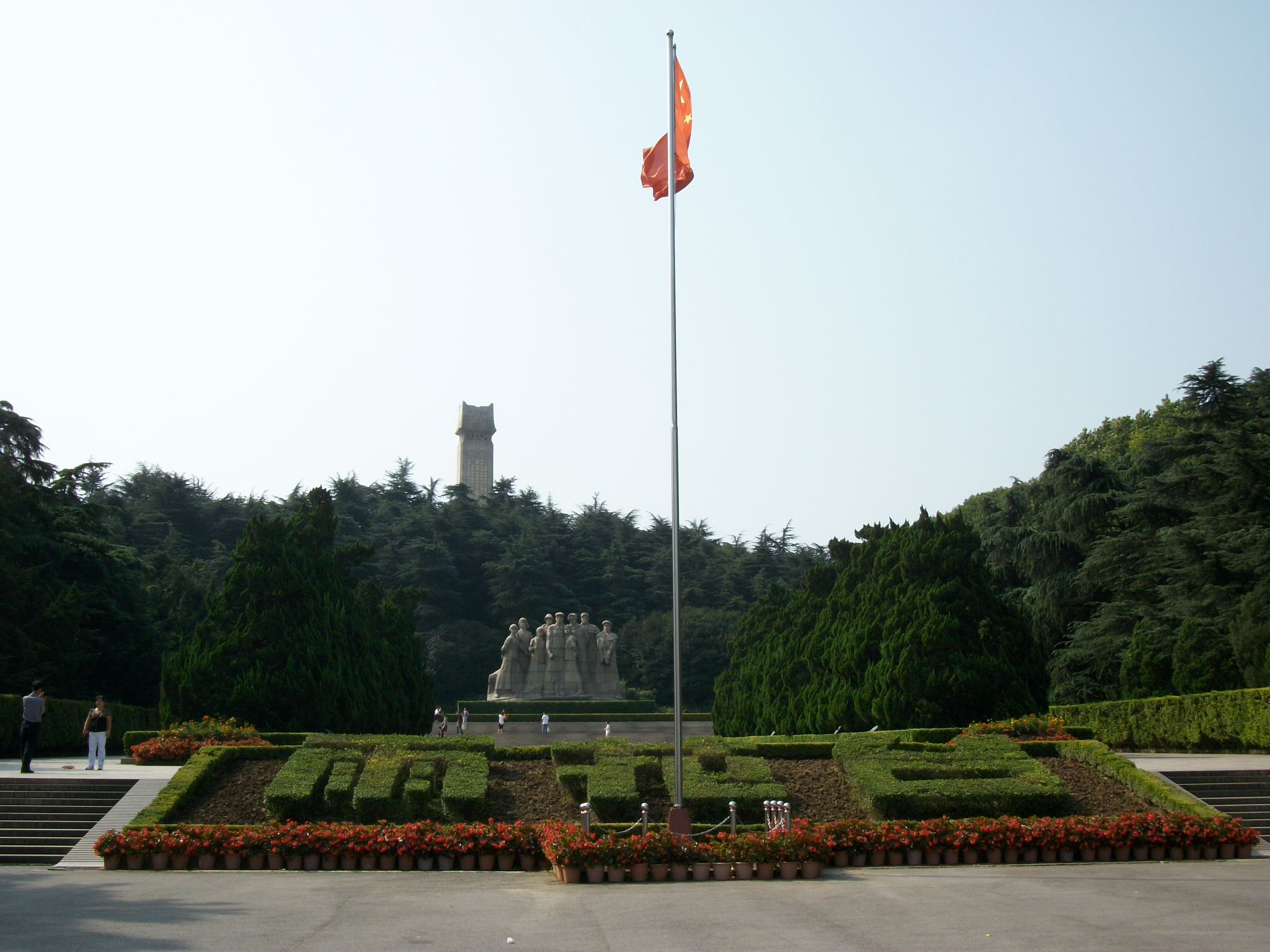
North Main Gate

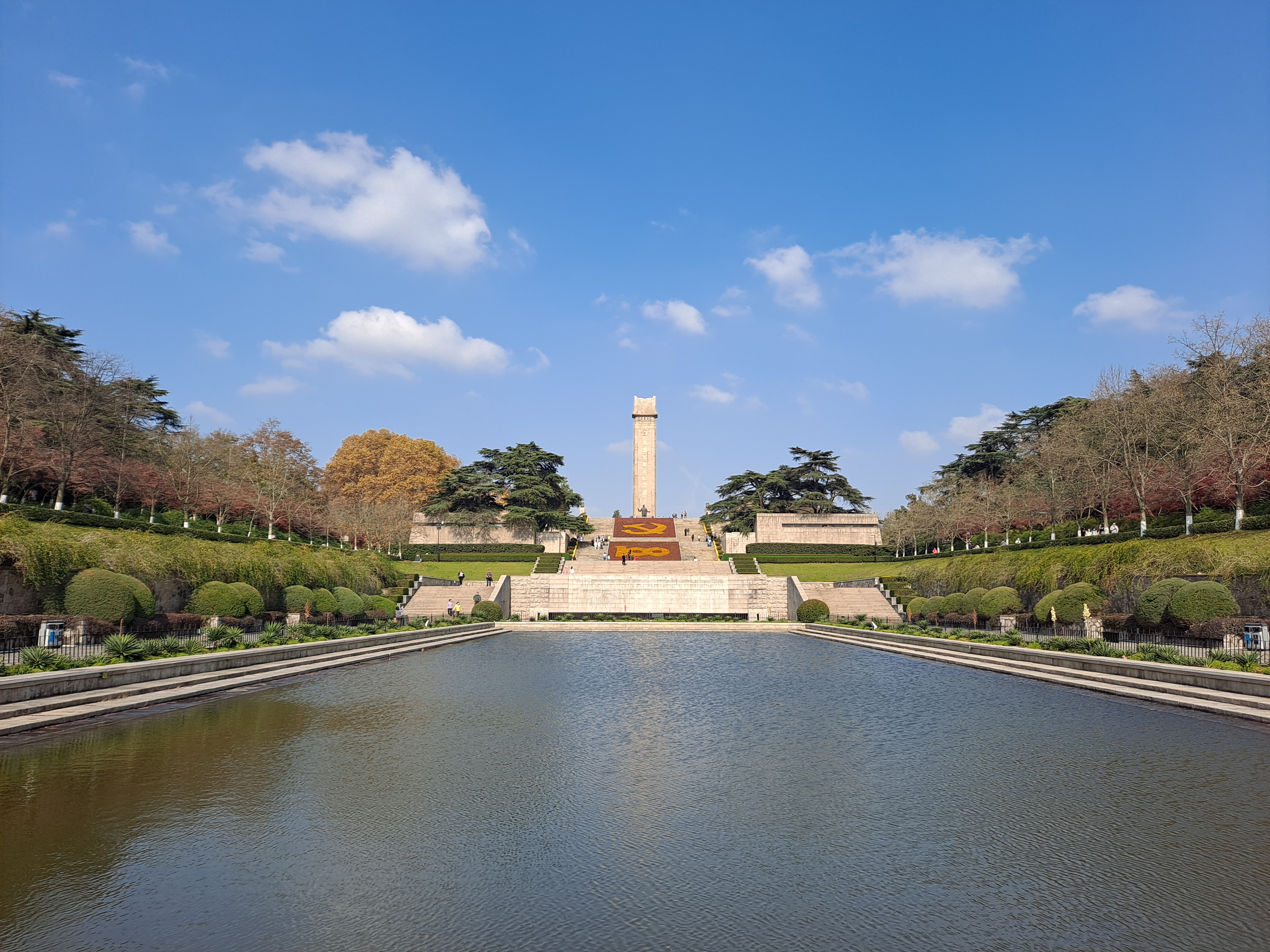
Yuhuatai Martyrs' Cemetery

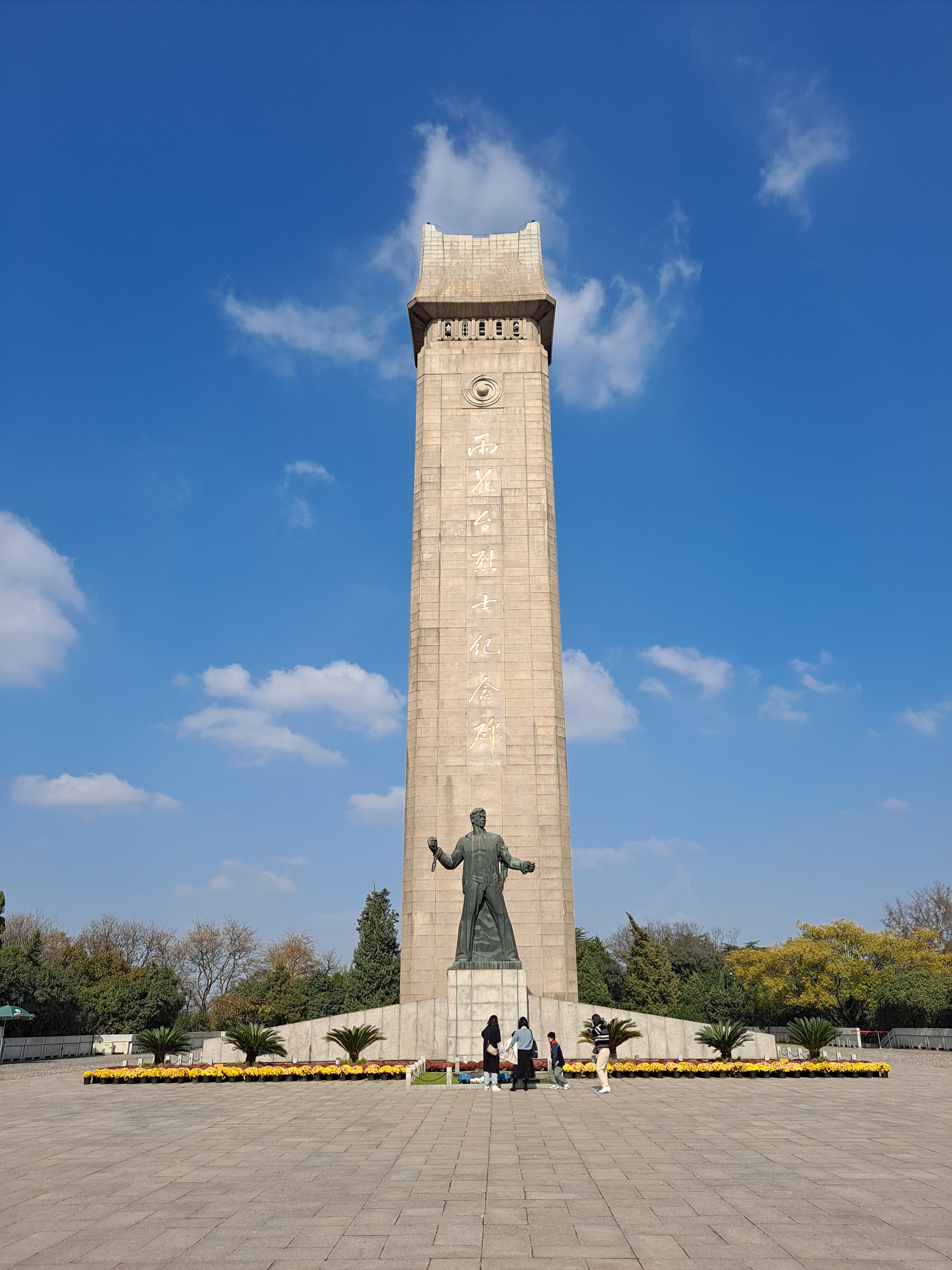
Yuhuatai Martyrs' Cemetery

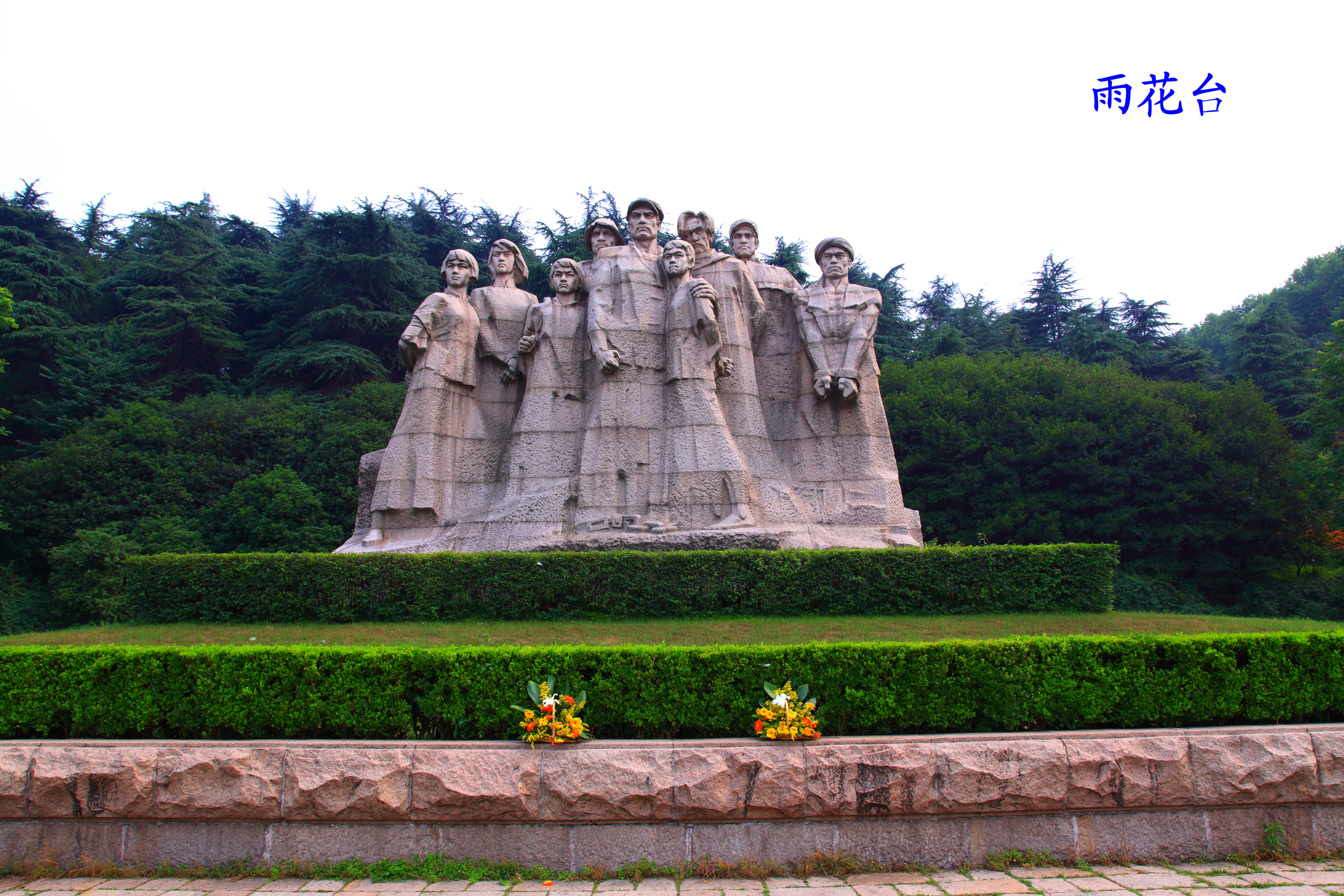
Martyrs' Cemetery

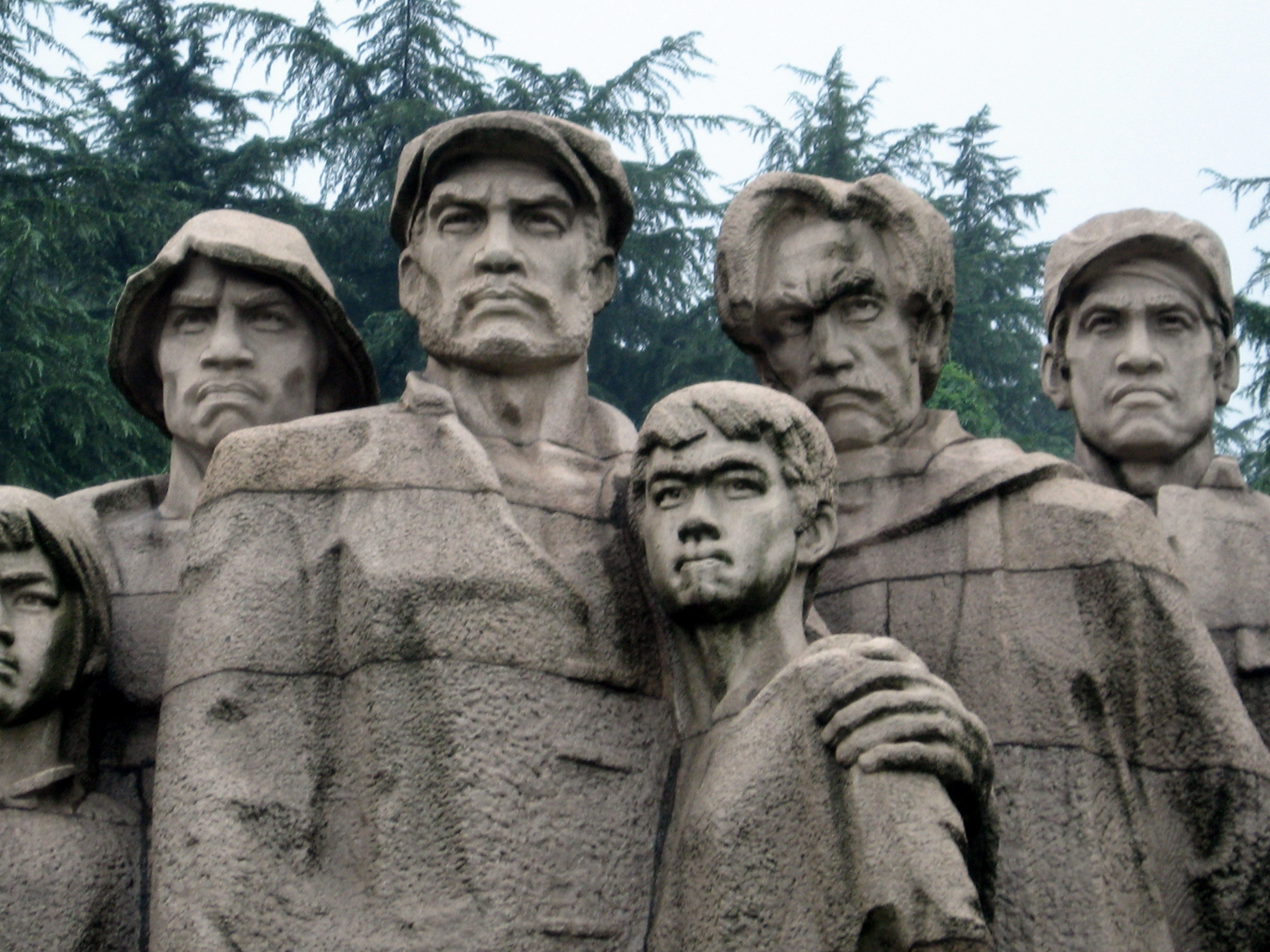
Martyrs' Cemetery

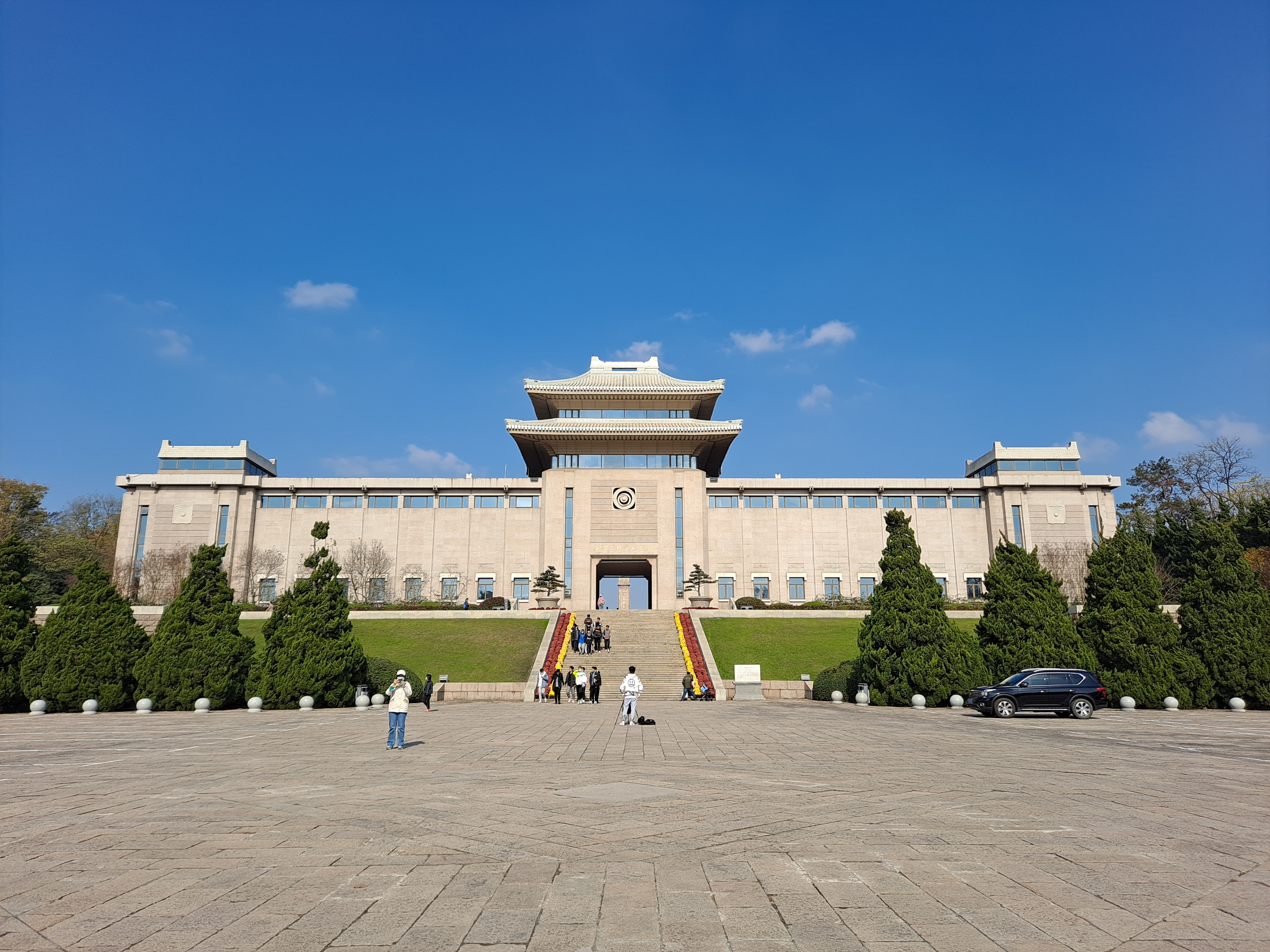
Memorials

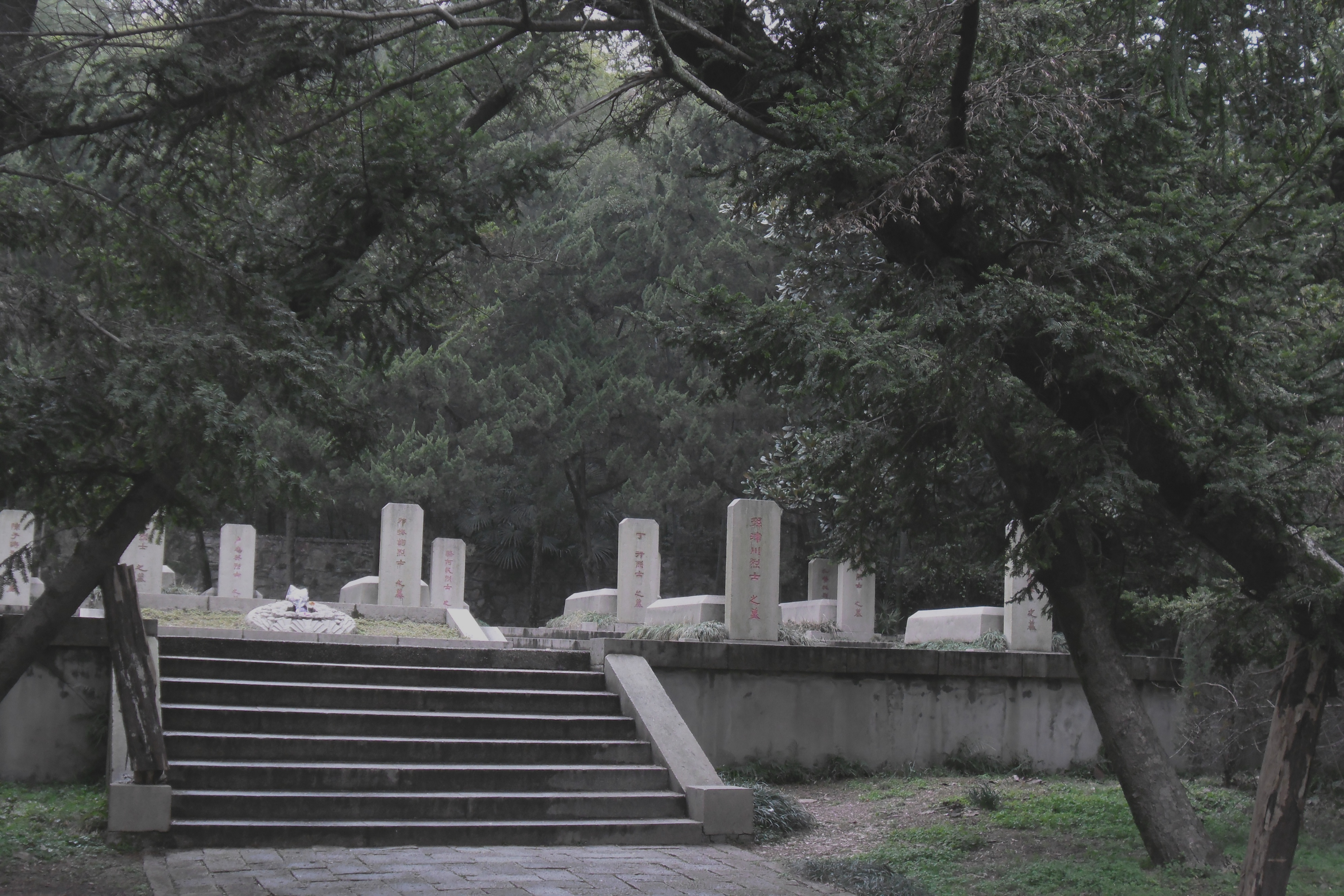
Tomb of the Well-Known Martyrs

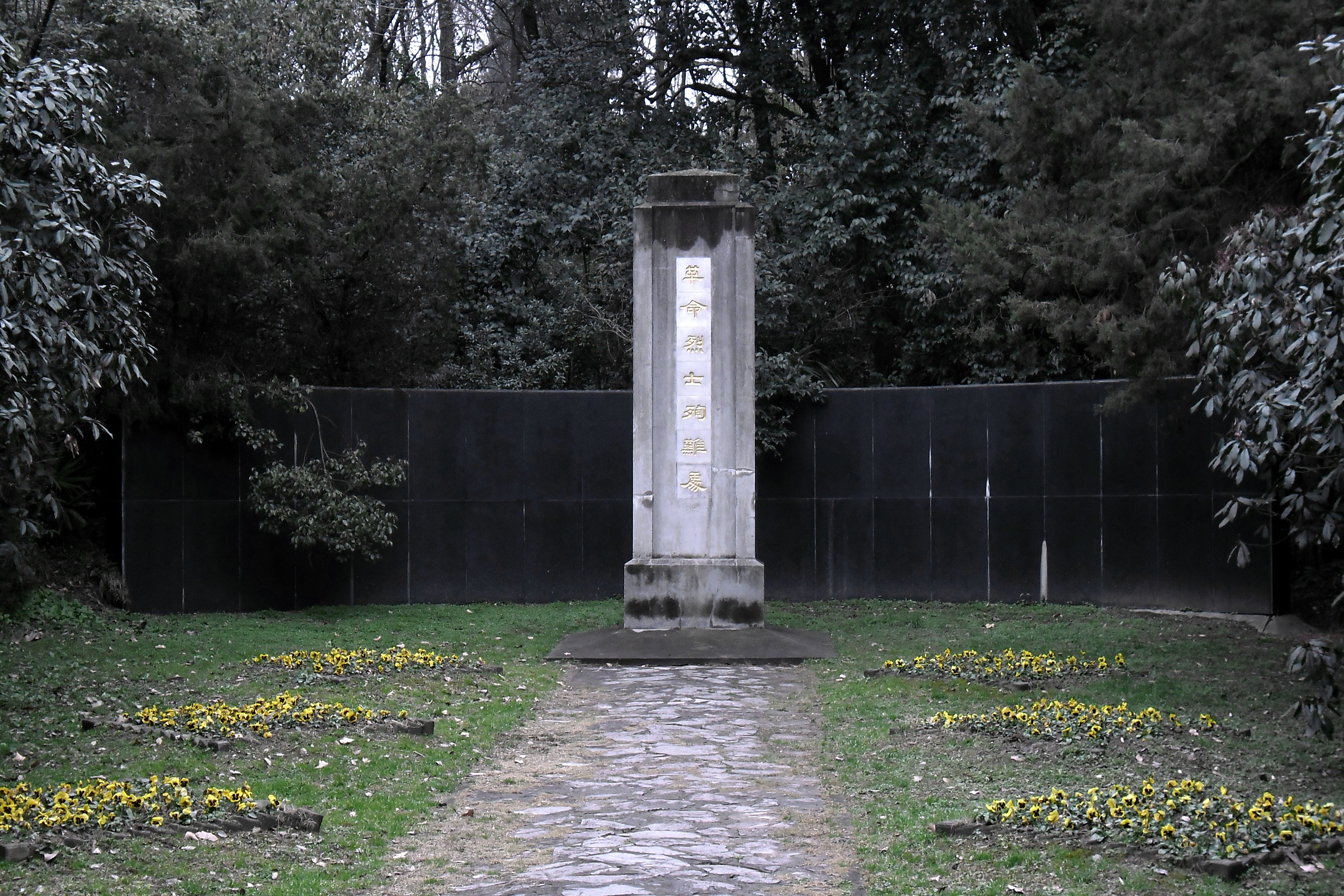
Revolutionary Martyrs' Martyrdom Place

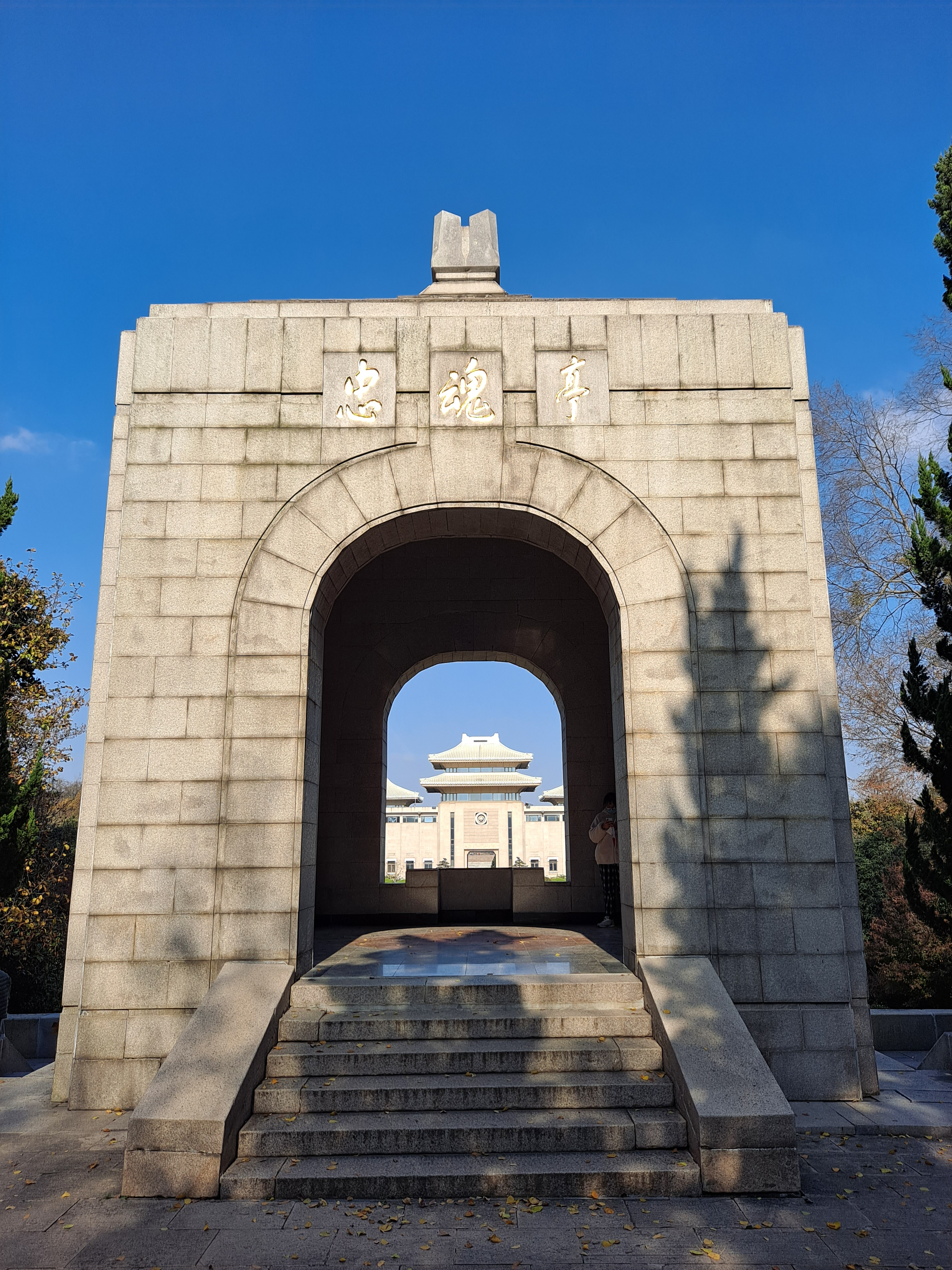
Loyal Soul Pavilion

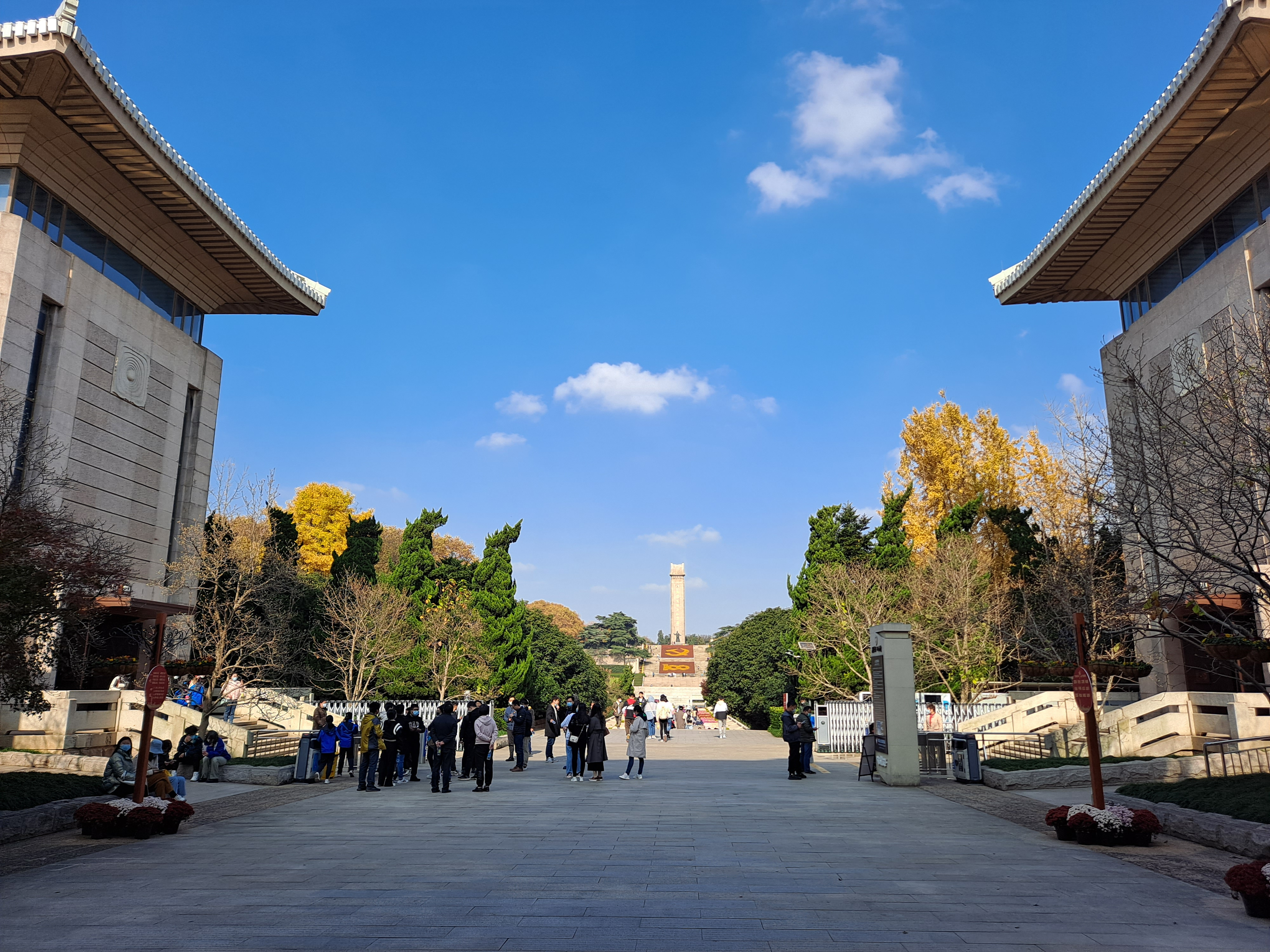
Yuhuatai

Yuhuatai

== See also ==
- Yuhuatai, Nanjing
