= Katsuichi Honda =

Japanese journalist (born 1932)

- Born: January 28, 1932 (age 94)
- Occupation: Journalist
- Employer: Asahi Shimbun

Katsuichi Honda (Japanese: 本多 勝一, Hepburn: Honda Katsuichi; born January 28, 1932) is a Japanese journalist and author most famous for his writing on the Nanjing Massacre. During the 1970s he wrote a series of articles on the atrocities committed by Imperial Japanese soldiers during World War II called "Chūgoku no Tabi" (中国の旅, "Travels in China"). The series first appeared in the Asahi Shimbun.

Honda also worked as a war correspondent in Vietnam during the Vietnam War, an experience which, according to some historians, contributed to stoking his interest in Japanese wartime history.

== Career ==
=== Early career ===
Honda was a war correspondent in Vietnam from December 1966 to 1968. He published a book on the Vietnam War titled Vietnam War: A Report through Asian Eyes in 1972.

=== "Travels in China" ===
During the 1970s Honda wrote a series of articles on the atrocities committed by Japanese soldiers during World War II (including the Nanjing Massacre) called "Chūgoku no Tabi" (中国の旅, "Travels in China"). The series first appeared in the Asahi Shimbun.

The U.S. Occupation authorities in Japan at first banned the teaching of Japanese history. After the ban was lifted in November 1946, school textbooks referred routinely but briefly to the Nanjing Massacre. These references disappeared from about 1955 with the stigmatizing of Marxist historians who were critical of "imperial myths and morals" during the Cold War. The "spirit of patriotism" was to be written into school textbooks, to take the place of the "red textbooks" which were critical of the state and the Emperor. The Nanjing Massacre was written out of Japanese textbooks completely from the 1950s to 1970s, until disgust with the Vietnam War led Japanese society to rethink Japanese militarism in the World War II period. Katsuichi Honda's 1971 "Travels in China" was a keystone of this reexamination of the war era.

Just as Honda, in writing about the Vietnam War, had sought to narrate the war "through Asian Eyes", his scholarship on Imperial Japanese action in China sought to depict Japanese aggression from a Chinese perspective. The text stimulated much interest and debate, and had both supporters and detractors. Among the more intense rebuttals to the text was that of Yamamoto Shichihei, a World War II veteran and popular commentator, who attacked in particular an account recorded by Honda of the hundred man killing contest. The contest would become a favorite target of revisionist writers in regards to the Nanjing Massacre, in later years. Tomio Hora answered skepticism of the account with subsequent scholarship. Detailed research by Wakabayashi subsequently claimed that the competition was indeed a press fabrication of the time.

=== Later career ===
1999 saw the English language publication of Honda's The Nanjing Massacre: A Japanese Journalist Confronts Japan's National Shame. The book was principally a translation of Honda's The Road to Nanjing (南京への道, Nankin e no michi, 1987) but was also supplemented with excerpts from his "Travel to China" and The Nanjing Massacre (南京大虐殺, Nankin Daigyakusatsu, 1997). The book, translated by Karen Sandness, was published by M.E. Sharpe in connection with the Pacific Basin Institute. Pacific Basin's founder, Frank Gibney, also edited the book, writing an introduction critical of Iris Chang and her popular treatment of the massacre, The Rape of Nanking, which had been published two years prior.

Other works by Honda available in English include The Impoverished Spirit in Contemporary Japan: Selected Essays of Honda Katsuichi and Harukor: An Ainu Woman's Tale.

== Lawsuit ==
On August 23, 2005, a Tokyo District Court presided over by Judge Akio Doi ruled against the families of Toshiaki Mukai and Tsuyoshi Noda, Japanese soldiers who had participated in a "killing contest", to see who would be the first to kill 100 Chinese, in 1937. The families had sued the Mainichi Shimbun, whose predecessor, the Tokyo Nichi Nichi Shimbun, covered the story in 1937, as well as the Asahi Shimbun and Honda for his stories in 1971 and (in book form) 1981.
