= Yuhuatai Senior High School =

School in Nanjing, China

Yuhuatai Senior High School (simplified Chinese: 南京市雨花台中学; traditional Chinese: 南京市雨花台中學) is a full-time senior high school under the direct jurisdiction of Yuhuatai Education Bureau, which is classified as one of the key high schools in Nanjing, China, in 1997 and as one of the key high schools in Jiangsu Province in 1999. Also in 1999, Yuhuatai Senior High School was named a four-star senior high school in Jiangsu Province.

Yuhuatai Senior High School was established in September 1957. From 1997, the government appropriated funds to extend the acreage of Yuhuatai School. In 1992, it moved to No 66. Zi Jing Flower Road, with a floor area of 78706 square metres and 36018.66 square metres for construction area.

The school has 157 staff and 1694 students. It is at the south of Yuhuatai Memorial Park of Revolutionary Martyrs and Yuhua District government.
