= Hundred man killing contest =

1937 event during the Japanese invasion of China

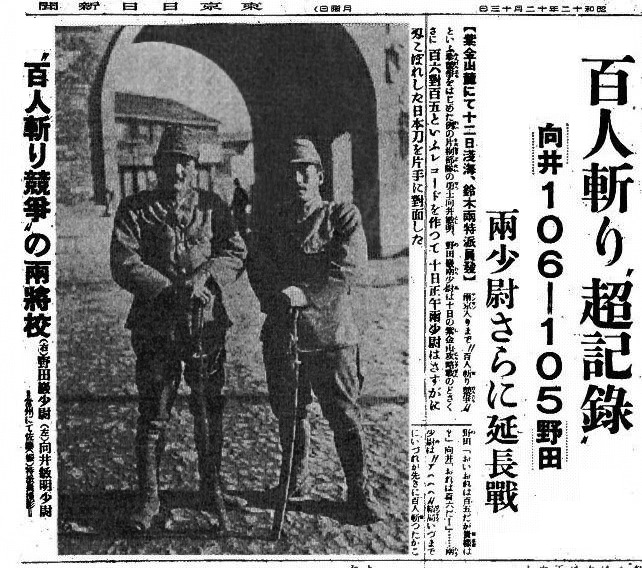
The Tokyo Nichi Nichi Shimbun's news coverage of the event on 13 December 1937. Mukai (left) and Noda (right). The bold headline on the right reads, "Hundred-man killing 'super record': Mukai 106 – 105 Noda: The two second lieutenants to continue the contest in overtime".

The hundred-man killing contest (also known as the Contest to kill 100 people using a sword or Competition that shall determine who is more proficient at slaying one-hundred men exclusively through the art of the blade; Japanese: 百人斬り競争, romanized: hyakunin-giri kyōsō; Chinese: 百人斬比賽; pinyin: Bǎirén zhǎn bǐsài) was a sensationalized story published first in prominent Japanese newspapers including the Tokyo Nichi Nichi Shimbun and Osaka Mainichi Shimbun in late 1937 during the Japanese invasion of China. The articles described two Imperial Japanese Army officers, Toshiaki Mukai and Tsuyoshi Noda, competing to see who could kill 100 people with a sword first while advancing toward Nanjing. Reporters covered the "contest" as if it was a sporting event, complete with running tallies and competitive banter. Later, other Japanese newspapers had picked up and reprinted the stories. However modern historians widely regard these newspaper accounts as Japanese wartime propaganda or exaggeration. The original accounts printed in the newspaper described the killings as hand-to-hand combat; however, historians have suggested that they were most likely a part of Japanese mass killings of Chinese prisoners of war.

Both officers were later convicted by the Nanjing War Crimes Tribunal for war crimes and crimes against humanity due to their involvement in atrocities, including the unlawful killing of Chinese POWs and civilians during the Nanjing Massacre, and were executed in 1948. They were not convicted solely on the basis of the contest articles.

The news stories were rediscovered in the 1970s, which sparked a larger controversy over Japanese war crimes in China, particularly the Nanjing Massacre.

== Wartime accounts ==
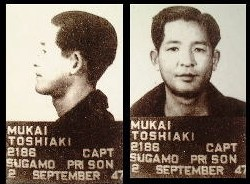
Mukai at Sugamo Prison after his arrest by the U.S. Army

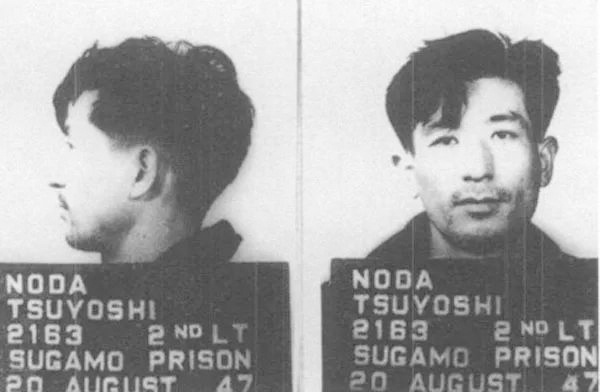
Noda at Sugamo Prison after his arrest by the U.S. Army

From November 30, 1937, to December 13, 1937, the Osaka Mainichi Shimbun and its sister newspaper the Tokyo Nichi Nichi Shimbun covered the hundred-man killing contest in four articles, with the last two translated in the Japan Advertiser. According to the reports, the two Japanese Army second lieutenants Toshiaki Mukai (向井 敏明) and Tsuyoshi Noda (野田 毅) were vying with one another to be the first to kill 100 people with a sword, as the Imperial Japanese Army advanced from Shanghai to Nanjing, prior to the infamous Nanjing Massacre.

According to the Tokyo Nichi Nichi Shimbun's report on December 13, 1937, Toshiaki Mukai said, "Without realising, we both surpassed 100 people. It was quite pleasant." Because it was difficult to determine which officer killed 100 people first and won the contest, according to journalists Asami Kazuo and Suzuki Jiro, they decided to begin another contest to kill 150 people with a sword, beginning on December 11th. The Nichi Nichi headline of the story on 13 December read, "Hundred-man killing 'super record': Mukai 106 – 105 Noda: The two second lieutenants to continue the contest in overtime".

Other soldiers and historians have noted the improbability of the lieutenants' heroics, which entailed killing enemy after enemy in fierce hand-to-hand combat. Noda himself, on returning to his hometown, admitted this during a speech that "I killed only four or five with sword in the real combat ... After we captured an enemy trench, we'd tell them, 'Ni Lai Lai.' (Note: "Ni Lai Lai" (Chinese: 你来来) can be translated as "you, come, come".) The Chinese soldiers were stupid enough to come out the trench toward us one after another. We'd line them up and cut them down from one end to the other."

== Trial and execution ==
After the war, a written record of the contest found its way into the documents of the International Military Tribunal for the Far East. In 1947, the two soldiers were arrested by the U.S. Army and detained at Sugamo Prison. They were then extradited to China and tried by the Nanjing War Crimes Tribunal. On trial with the two men was Gunkichi Tanaka, a Japanese Army captain who personally killed over 300 Chinese POWs and civilians with his sword during the massacre. All three men were found guilty of atrocities committed during the Battle of Nanjing and the subsequent Nanjing Massacre, and sentenced to death. On 28 January 1948, the three were executed by shooting at a selected spot in the mountains of the Yuhuatai District. Mukai and Noda were both 35 years old; Tanaka was 42.

== Modern assessment ==
In Japan, the contest was lost to the obscurity of history until 1967, when Tomio Hora (a professor of history at Waseda University) published a 118-page document pertaining to the events of Nanjing. The story was unreported by the Japanese press until 1971, when Japanese journalist Katsuichi Honda brought the issue to the attention of the public with a series of articles written for Asahi Shimbun, which focused on interviews with Chinese survivors of the World War II occupation and massacres.

In Japan, the articles sparked fierce debate about the Nanjing Massacre, with the veracity of the killing contest a particularly contentious point of debate. Over the following years, many authors have argued over whether the Nanjing Massacre even occurred, with viewpoints on the subject also being a predictor for whether they believed the contest was a fabrication. The Sankei Shimbun and Japanese politician Tomomi Inada have publicly demanded that the Asahi and Mainichi media companies retract their wartime reporting of the contest.

In a later work, Katsuichi Honda placed the account of the killing contest into the context of its effect on Imperial Japanese forces in China. In one instance, Honda notes Japanese veteran Shintaro Uno's autobiographical description of the effect on his sword after consecutively beheading nine prisoners. Uno compares his experiences with those of the two lieutenants from the killing contest. Although he had believed the inspirational tales of hand-to-hand combat in his youth, after his own experience in the war, he came to believe the killings were more likely brutal executions. Uno adds,

Whatever you say, it's silly to argue about whether it happened this way or that way when the situation is clear. There were hundreds of thousands of soldiers like Mukai and Noda, including me, during those fifty years of war between Japan and China. At any rate, it was nothing more than a commonplace occurrence during the so-called Chinese Disturbance.

In 2000, Bob Wakabayashi weighed in with his own study which concluded that although "the killing contest itself was a fabrication" by journalists, it "provoked a full-blown controversy as to the historicity of the Nanking Atrocity as a whole." In turn, the controversy "increased the Japanese people's knowledge of the Atrocity and raised their awareness of being victimizers in a war of imperialist aggression despite efforts to the contrary by conservative revisionists." In a later book, Wakabayashi quotes Joshua Fogel as saying that "to accept the story as true and accurate requires a leap of faith that no balanced historian can make."

The Nanjing Massacre Memorial in China includes a display on the contest among its many exhibits. A Japan Times article has suggested that its presence allows revisionists to "sow seeds of doubt" about the accuracy of the entire collection.

The contest is depicted in the 1994 film Black Sun: The Nanking Massacre, as well as the 2009 film, John Rabe.

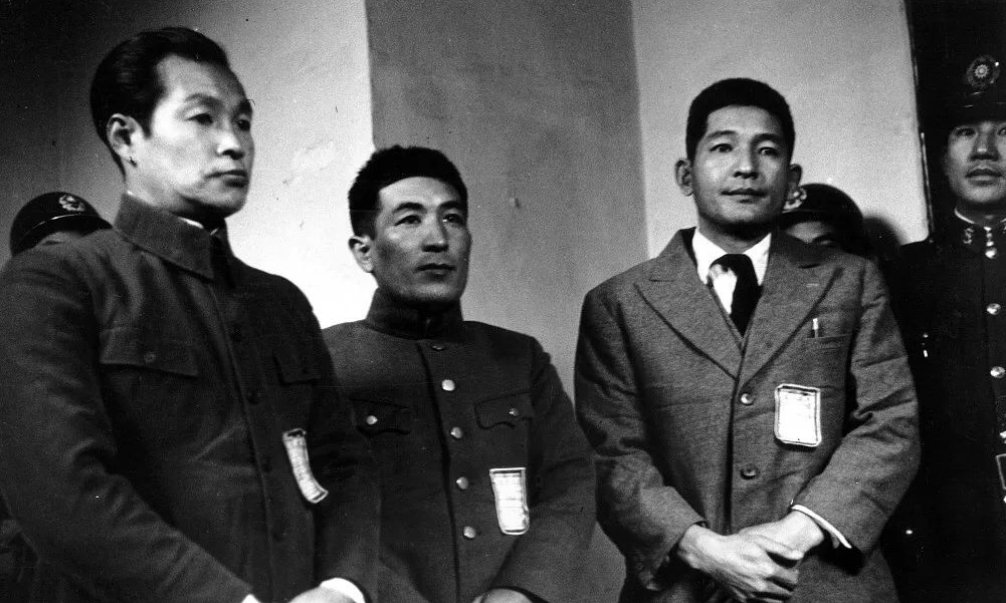
Noda, center, and Mukai, right, during their trial for war crimes in China. Gunkichi Tanaka is on the left.

In April 2003, the families of Toshiaki Mukai and Tsuyoshi Noda filed a defamation suit against Katsuichi Honda, Kashiwa Shobō, the Asahi Shimbun, and the Mainichi Shimbun, requesting ¥36,000,000 in compensation, and for Honda's publications to be retracted due to "inveracity". On 23 August 2005, Tokyo District Court Judge Akio Doi ruled against the plaintiffs. The court argued that as both soldiers were deceased, discussions over their wartime behavior do not infringe on their "honor and privacy rights". Instead, it could be claimed that a false narrative infringed on the plaintiffs' "affection for and admiration for the two lieutenants", but the court dismissed this claim as well. The judge noted that "the contents of the news article are ... extremely questionable" but that second-hand discussions of the news story do not constitute slander; instead, it has become part of a historical discussion wherein "the evaluation as a historical fact is still in the undetermined situation." Some evidence of killing Chinese POWs (not hand-to-hand fighting) was shown by the defendants, and the court supported the possibility that the "contestants" killed POWs by sword, which in its view would suggest that the story is not "completely false in an important part". In December 2006, the Supreme Court of Japan upheld the decision of the Tokyo District Court.

== See also ==
- Nanking (1937–1945)
- Tameshigiri
- Japanese war crimes
- Petar Brzica
- Human safari, similar occurrence during Russian invasion of Ukraine
