= Nanjing War Crimes Tribunal =

Chinese tribunal (1946–48) of Japanese leaders

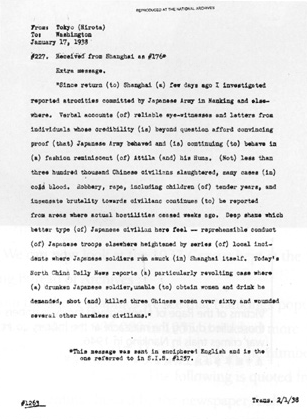
Harold John Timperley's telegram of 17 January 1938 describing some atrocities and used as proof against Hisao Tani

The Nanjing War Crimes Tribunal was established in 1946 by the Nationalist government of the Republic of China under the Ministry of National Defense to judge Imperial Japanese Army officers accused of crimes under Category B and C committed during the Second Sino-Japanese War. It was one of ten tribunals established by the Nationalist government.

The accused included Lieutenant General Hisao Tani, the general Rensuke Isogai, company commander Captain Gunkichi Tanaka and Second Lieutenants Toshiaki Mukai and Tsuyoshi Noda, made famous by the hundred man killing contest.

== History ==
General Yasuji Okamura was convicted of war crimes in July 1948 by the Tribunal, but was immediately protected by the personal order of Nationalist leader Chiang Kai-shek, who retained him as a military adviser for the Kuomintang (KMT).

While he was questioned by the investigators, he however testified about the Nanjing Massacre:

I surmised the following based on what I heard from Staff Officer Miyazaki, CCAA Special Service Department Chief Harada and Hangzhou Special Service Department Chief Hagiwara a day or two after I arrived in Shanghai. First, it is true that tens of thousands of acts of violence, such as looting and rape, took place against civilians during the assault on Nanking. Second, front-line troops indulged in the evil practice of executing POWs on the pretext of (lacking) rations.

Iwane Matsui had been judged by the Tokyo tribunal; Prince Kan'in Kotohito, Kesago Nakajima and Heisuke Yanagawa had been dead since 1945; Isamu Chō had committed suicide; and Prince Yasuhiko Asaka had been granted immunity by General Douglas MacArthur as a member of the imperial family. Hisao Tani was therefore the only other general prosecuted for the Nanjing Massacre. He was found guilty on 6 February 1947 and executed by a firing squad on 26 April. All the accused were sentenced to death in 1947.

The death toll of 300,000 is the official estimate engraved on the stone wall at the entrance of the Memorial Hall for Compatriot Victims of the Japanese Military's Nanjing Massacre in Nanjing.

== Notable defendants ==
- Rensuke Isogai: Former governor of Hong Kong and Chief of Staff of the Kwantung Army. Sentenced to life imprisonment. Released in 1952 and allowed to return to Japan. Died in 1967.
- Takashi Sakai: Former governor of Hong Kong and commander of various Japanese armies in China. Sentenced to death and executed in 1946.
- Hisakazu Tanaka: Former governor of Hong Kong and commander of the 23rd Army. Sentenced to death and executed in 1947.
- Hisao Tani: A commander of Japanese units that committed the Nanjing Massacre. Sentenced to death and executed in 1947.
- Lieutenants Toshiaki Mukai and Tsuyoshi Noda: The two main participants in the "Contest to kill 100 people using a sword": Both sentenced to death and executed in 1948.
- Captain Gunkichi Tanaka: Personally killed over 300 Chinese POWs and civilians with his sword during the Nanjing Massacre. Sentenced to death and executed in 1948.

== See also ==
- Nanking (1937–1945)
- Iris Chang
- Nanjing Massacre
- International Military Tribunal for the Far East
- Nuremberg trials
