= Hisao Tani =

Japanese officer, war criminal 1882-1947

Tani Hisao
- 谷 寿夫
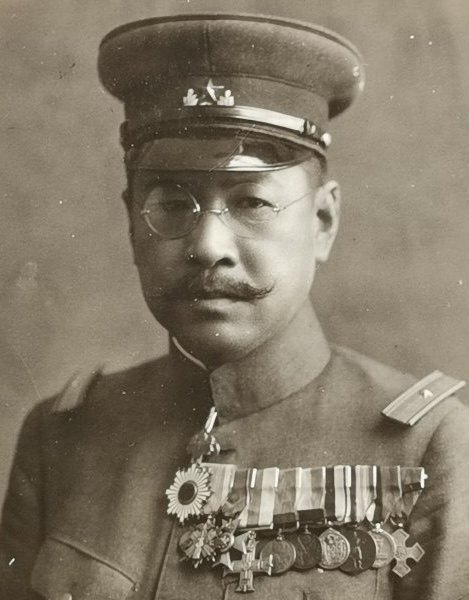
- Born: 23 December 1882; Okayama, Japan
- Died: 26 April 1947 (aged 64); Mount Yuhuatai, Nanjing, China
- Status: Executed by shooting
- Convictions: War crimes Crimes against humanity
- Trial: Nanjing War Crimes Tribunal
- Penalty: Death
- Military career
- Allegiance: Empire of Japan
- Service years: 1903–1945
- Rank: Lieutenant General
- Commands: Imperial Japanese Army
- Conflicts: Russo-Japanese War; World War I (observer); Second Sino-Japanese War; World War II; Pacific War

Hisao Tani (谷 寿夫, Tani Hisao; 22 December 1882 – 26 April 1947) was a lieutenant general in the Imperial Japanese Army in the Second Sino-Japanese War and a convicted war criminal, who was also convicted of crimes against humanity. Forces under his command committed the 1937 Nanjing Massacre. Tani was tried in the Nanjing War Crimes Tribunal and executed.

== Biography ==
=== Early military career ===
Tani was born to a farming family in Okayama Prefecture. He graduated from the 15th class of the Imperial Japanese Army Academy in 1903, placing 16th in his class. One of his classmates, Yasusuke Nogi, was the younger son of General Nogi Maresuke, and later died in combat during the Russo-Japanese War. Tani also saw combat during that war as a second lieutenant in the Guard's First Infantry Battalion, although his training at the academy had been in artillery. After the war, he graduated in third place from the 24th class of the Army War College in 1912. Tani later wrote an account of his experiences in the war, together with first-hand accounts of survivors, which was published under the title Secret History of the Russo-Japanese War (機密日露戦史, Kimitsu Nichiro Senso-shi). The book became a required textbook for the Army Staff College, although it was criticized by Field Marshal Uehara Yusaku for inaccuracies.

Tani was posted to Great Britain as a military attaché from 1915, and from August 1917 he was embedded in the front lines as an official military observer for the Japanese government on the combat situation on the Western Front in World War I. After his return to Japan, in April 1919 he served as an instructor at the Army Staff College, and was reappointed to that position in February 1924. In February 1927 he was promoted to colonel and made commander of the IJA 61st Infantry Regiment. In August 1928, he became chief-of-staff of the Nagoya-based IJA 3rd Division.

In May 1930, Tani was named to the League of Nations Standing Committee on Military Aviation. He was promoted to major general in August 1930. He returned to Japan in 1932 to become Chairman of Military Investigation, and from August 1933 was commander of the Guards 2nd Brigade. he was promoted to lieutenant general in August 1934. He served as commander of Tokyo Bay Fortress from August 1934 to December 1935. He was then sent to Kumamoto to oversee the reconstruction of the IJA 6th Division.

=== World War II ===
In July 1937, the IJA 6th Division was assigned to the Japanese China Garrison Army, and immediately began combat operations in the Second Sino-Japanese War starting with the ongoing Battle of Beiping–Tianjin. Afterward, it participated in Beiping–Hankou Railway Operation. In October 1937, the division was re-subordinated to IJA 10th Army and attacked the Chinese troops concentration at Hangzhou Bay. By December 1937, it shifted west to join the IJA 18th division and IJA 114th division in the Battle of Nanking and ultimately in the Nanjing Massacre.

Returned to Japan at the end of 1937, Tani became commander of the Central District Army until September 1939 when he went into the reserves.

However, after the Atomic bombing of Hiroshima, Tani was recalled to active service to take command of the IJA 59th Army and concurrently the Chugoku Regional Army District. These organizations were part of the last desperate defense effort by the Empire of Japan to deter possible landings of Allied forces in the San'yo region of western Honshū and consisted mostly of poorly trained reservists, conscripted students and home guard militia. The IJA 59th Army was officially demobilized after the surrender of Japan on August 15, 1945.

=== Trial and execution ===
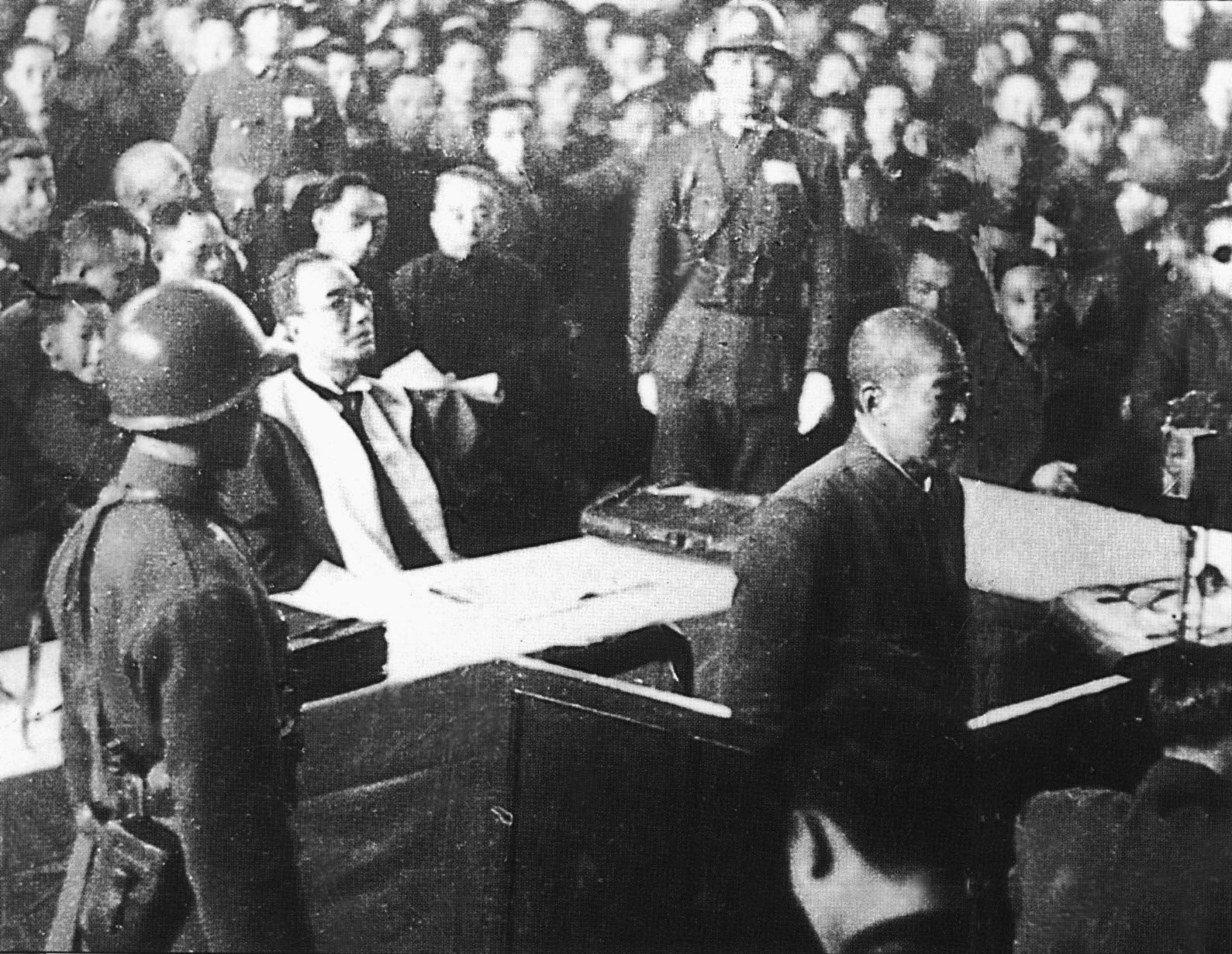
Tani on trial at the Nanjing War Crimes Tribunal.

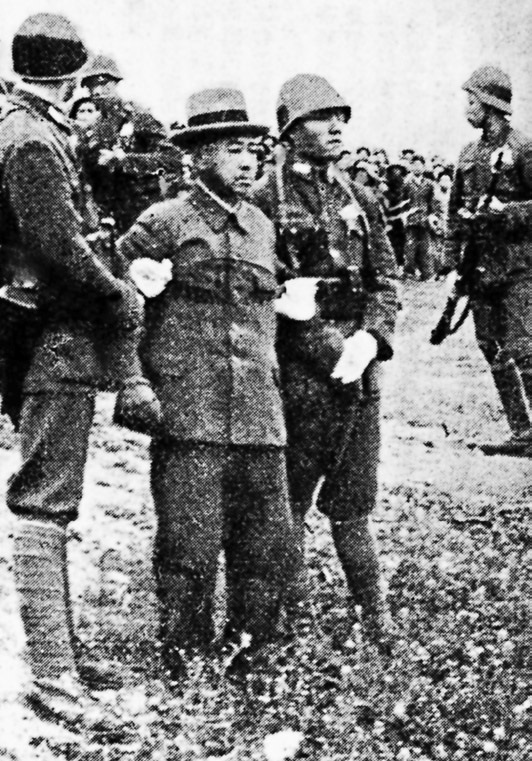
Tani brought to his execution site outside the south gate of Nanking.

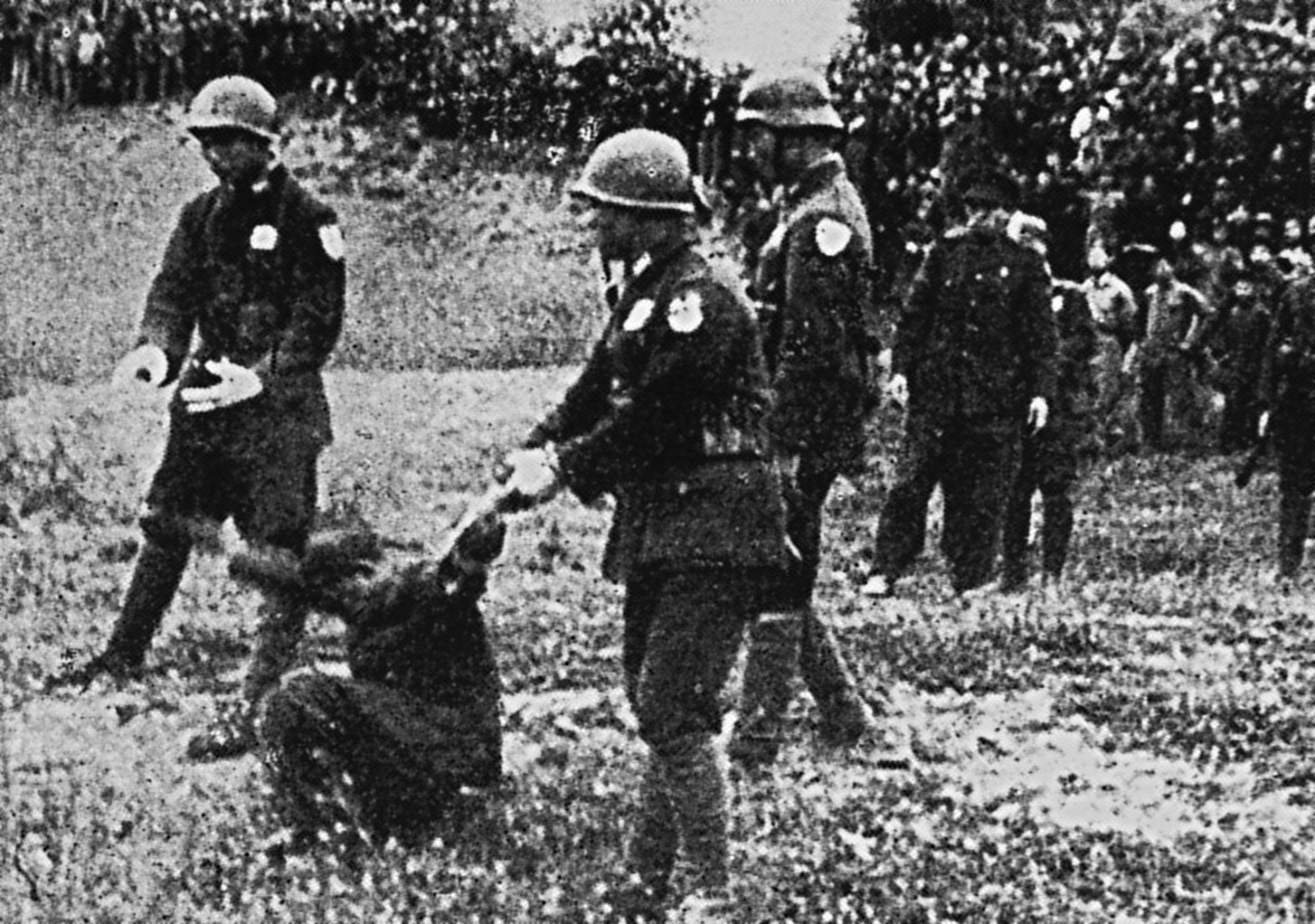
Tani executed outside the south gate of Nanking.

In February 1946, Tani was arrested on orders of the American occupation authorities and charged with Class B and Class C war crimes. At the request of the Chinese government, he was extradited to China to stand trial at the Nanjing War Crimes Tribunal in August 1946. Tani denied all charges at the trial, stating that his troops kept discipline, and the area of Nanjing assigned to his division had been largely evacuated due to the ferocity of the battle. Furthermore, none of the witnesses against him could identify his unit numbers, and indeed the evidence presented to the court pertained to troops and areas of the city under General Kesago Nakajima and General Shigeharu Suematsu. However, the presiding judge refused Tani's request to call on his chief of staff and surviving junior officers as witnesses, and stated that since the various atrocities which occurred in Nanjing were testified to by hundreds of surviving witness as well as several foreigners from Nanking Safety Zone, he was unwilling and unable to divide responsibility. According to the ruling of the court, all of the Japanese commanders involved in the Battle of Nanjing had an equally shared responsibility for atrocities which occurred during the Rape of Nanjing, and this included Generals Iwane Matsui, Heisuke Yanagawa and Sadao Ushijima as well as Nakajima, Suematsu and Tani. He was consequently sentenced to death as a BC-class war criminal. On 26 April 1947 he was escorted to his execution spot at Mount Yuhuatai and publicly executed by shooting. The crowds of Chinese civilians who witnessed the execution were cursing at him for the atrocities he committed.

== Family ==
Tani's son, Hayao Tani, was also an officer in the Imperial Japanese Army. A graduate of the 49th class of the Imperial Japanese Army Academy and the 58th class of the Army Staff College, he was a colonel on the staff of the IJA 34th Army and was killed in combat in November 1944.

== Decorations ==
- 1939 – Grand Cordon of the Order of the Sacred Treasure
- 1939 – Order of the Golden Kite, 5th class
- 1940 – Grand Cordon of the Order of the Rising Sun

== See also ==
- Capital punishment in China
- Nanjing Massacre
- Nanjing War Crimes Tribunal
