= Mainichi Shimbun =

Japanese newspaper

- Front page of Mainichi Shimbun from September 8, 2013
- Type: Daily newspaper
- Format: Blanket (54.6 cm x 40.65 cm)
- Owner: The Mainichi Newspapers
- Publisher: Masato Kitamura
- Founded: February 21, 1872; 154 years ago (as the Tokyo Nichi Nichi Shimbun)
- Political alignment: Centre to centre-left Liberalism (Japanese)
- Language: Japanese
- Headquarters: Chiyoda, Tokyo; Osaka; Nagoya; Kitakyushu
- Circulation: Morning edition: 1,034,000 (2026); Evening edition: 380,000 (2025)
- Website: www.mainichi.jp

The Mainichi Shimbun (毎日新聞, Mainichi Shinbun; Japanese pronunciation: [mai.ɲi.tɕi̥ ɕiꜜm.bɯɴ], lit. 'Daily Newspaper') is one of the major newspapers in Japan, published by The Mainichi Newspapers Co.

In addition to the Mainichi Shimbun, which is printed twice a day in several local editions, Mainichi also operates an English-language news website called The Mainichi (毎日; [mai.ɲi.tɕi], (Note: This is a proper noun and an ellipsis of Mainichi Shimbun. The common noun meaning "every day" is pronounced [maꜜi.ɲi.tɕi].) previously Mainichi Daily News, abbreviated MDN), and publishes a bilingual news magazine, Mainichi Weekly. It also publishes paperbacks, books and other magazines, including a weekly news magazine, Sunday Mainichi.

It is one of the four national newspapers in Japan; the other three are The Asahi Shimbun, the Yomiuri Shimbun and the Nihon Keizai Shimbun. The Sankei Shimbun and the Chunichi Shimbun are not currently in the position of a national newspaper despite a large circulation for both.

== History ==
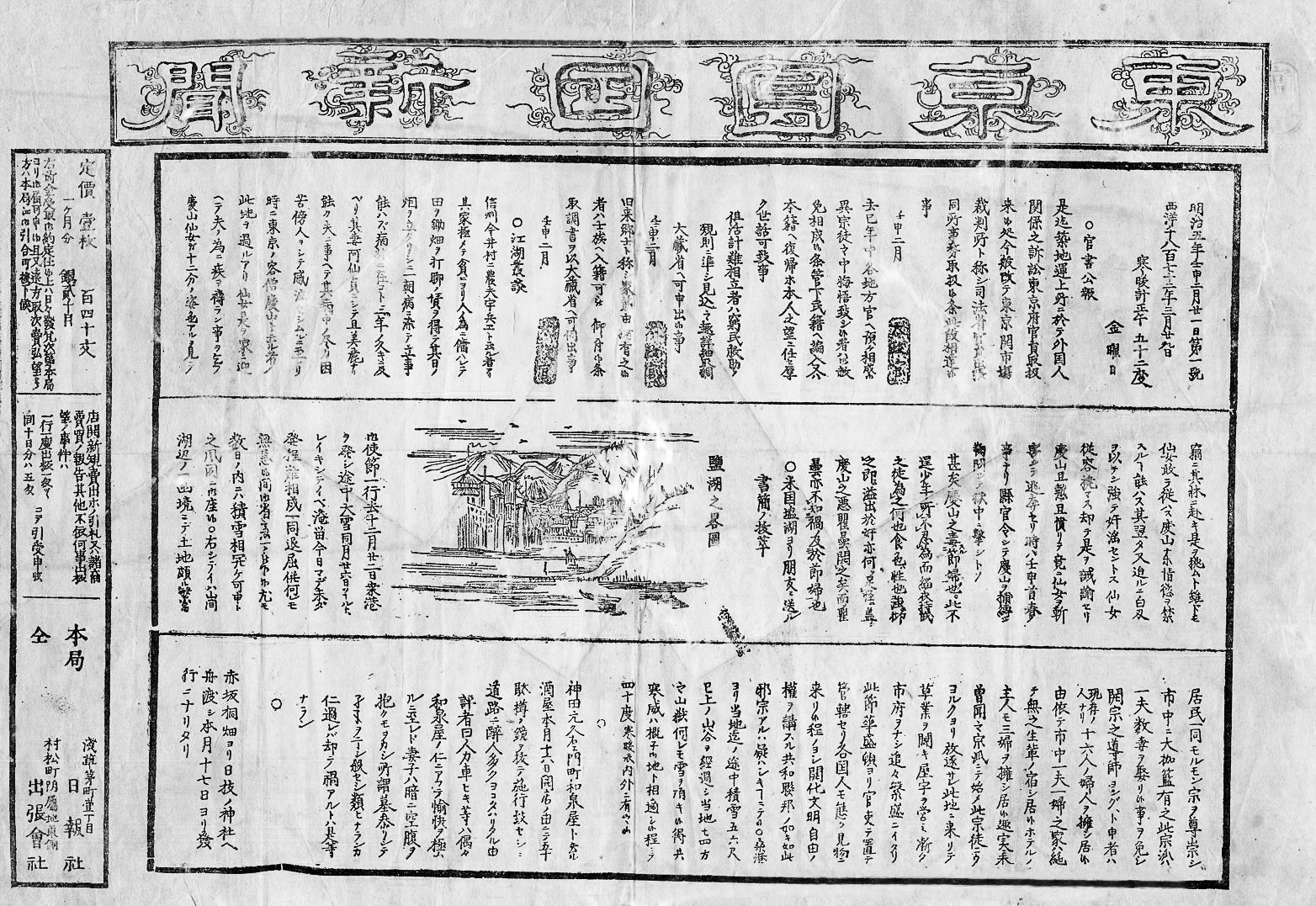
First issue of Tokyo Nichi Nichi Shimbun published on February 21, 1872

The history of the Mainichi Shimbun began with the founding of two papers during the Meiji period. The Tokyo Nichi Nichi Shimbun was founded first, in 1872. The Mainichi claims that it is the oldest existing Japanese daily newspaper with its 136-year history. The Osaka Mainichi Shimbun was founded four years later, in 1876. The two papers merged in 1911, but the two companies continued to print their newspapers independently until 1943, when both editions were placed under a Mainichi Shimbun masthead. In 1966, the Tokyo office was moved from Yurakucho to Takebashi, and in 1992, the Osaka office was moved from Dojima to Nishi-Umeda.

The Mainichi has 3,200 employees working in 364 offices in Japan and 26 bureaus overseas. It is one of Japan's three largest newspapers in terms of circulation and number of employees, and has 79 associated companies, including Tokyo Broadcasting System (TBS), Mainichi Broadcasting System (MBS) and the Sports Nippon Newspaper. (despite affiliation, the Mainichi does not have majority ownership in TBS nor in MBS)

The Mainichi is the only Japanese newspaper company to have won a Pulitzer Prize, for the 1960 photograph "Tokyo Stabbing", which captured the 1960 assassination of Inejirō Asanuma, chairman of the Japan Socialist Party. The Japan Newspapers Association, made up of 180 news organizations, has granted the Mainichi its Grand Prix award on 21 occasions, making the Mainichi the most frequent winner of the prize since its inception in 1957.

=== Partnership with MSN ===
On 15 January 2004, Mainichi Shimbun and MSN Japan announced they were to merge their websites. The partnership has been known as MSN-Mainichi Interactive, effective since 1 April 2004. On 18 September 2007, Mainichi announced the launch of their new website, mainichi.jp, which would include "heavy use of social bookmarking, RSS and blog parts" and would "pay attention to bloggers". The new website began operations on 1 October 2007, marking the end of MSN-Mainichi Interactive, being replaced by mainichi.jp. The English-language Mainichi Daily News also moved to the new website. MSN-Japan switched to Sankei Shimbun.

== Criticism and controversy ==
=== Sino-Japanese War coverage controversy ===
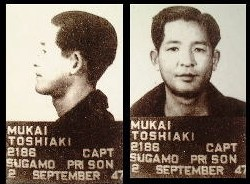
Mukai at Sugamo Prison after his arrest by the U.S. Army

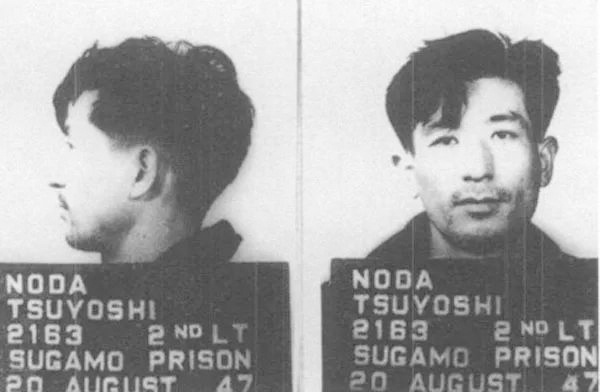
Noda at Sugamo Prison after his arrest by the U.S. Army

From November 30, 1937, to December 13, 1937, the Osaka Mainichi Shimbun and its sister newspaper the Tokyo Nichi Nichi Shimbun covered the hundred-man killing contest in four articles, with the last two translated in the Japan Advertiser. According to the reports, the two Japanese Army second lieutenants Toshiaki Mukai (向井 敏明) and Tsuyoshi Noda (野田 毅) were vying with one another to be the first to kill 100 people with a sword, as the Imperial Japanese Army advanced from Shanghai to Nanjing, prior to the infamous Nanjing Massacre.

According to the Tokyo Nichi Nichi Shimbun's report on December 13, 1937, Toshiaki Mukai said, "Without realising, we both surpassed 100 people. It was quite pleasant." Because it was difficult to determine which officer killed 100 people first and won the contest, according to journalists Asami Kazuo and Suzuki Jiro, they decided to begin another contest to kill 150 people with a sword, beginning on December 11th. The Nichi Nichi headline of the story on 13 December read, "Hundred-man killing 'super record': Mukai 106 – 105 Noda: The two second lieutenants to continue the contest in overtime".

Other soldiers and historians have noted the improbability of the lieutenants' heroics, which entailed killing enemy after enemy in fierce hand-to-hand combat. Noda himself, on returning to his hometown, admitted this during a speech that "I killed only four or five with sword in the real combat ... After we captured an enemy trench, we'd tell them, 'Ni Lai Lai.' (Note: "Ni Lai Lai" (Chinese: 你来来) can be translated as "you, come, come".) The Chinese soldiers were stupid enough to come out the trench toward us one after another. We'd line them up and cut them down from one end to the other."

=== WaiWai controversy and cancellation ===
The Mainichi Daily News column WaiWai, by Australian journalist Ryann Connell, featured often-sensationalist stories, principally translated from and based on articles appearing in Japanese tabloids. The column carried a disclaimer since September 19, 2002: "WaiWai stories are transcriptions of articles that originally appeared in Japanese language publications. The Mainichi Daily News cannot be held responsible for the content of the original articles, nor does it guarantee their accuracy. Views expressed in the WaiWai column are not necessarily those held by the Mainichi Daily News or the Mainichi Newspapers Co." Nevertheless, WaiWai content was reported as fact in blogs and reputable foreign media sources.

In April and May 2008, an aggressive anti-WaiWai campaign appeared on internet forums including 2channel. Criticism included "contents are too vulgar" and "the stories could cause Japanese people to be misunderstood abroad." Critics had accused the WaiWai column of propagating a racist stereotype of Japanese women as sexual deviants with its sensationalist stories about incest, bestiality and debauchery. On June 20, a news site J-CAST reported on this issue. The Mainichi editorial board responded by deleting controversial WaiWai articles and limiting archive access, but the column remained in the Sunday Mainichi. Citing continuing criticism, Mainichi's Digital Media Division shut down WaiWai on June 21. Mainichi also announced it would "severely punish the head of the Digital Media Division, which is responsible for overseeing the site, the manager responsible for the column and the editor involved with the stories." On June 25, Mainichi apologized to MDN readers. Some advertisers responded to the campaign by pulling ads from Mainichi's Japanese site.

On June 28, 2008, Mainichi announced punitive measures. Connell, who remained anonymous in the announcement, was suspended for three months ("issuing three months' disciplinary leave"). Other involved personnel were either docked 10%–20% salary or "stripped of their titles" for a period of one or two months.

On July 20, 2008, Mainichi released the results of an in-house investigation. Mainichi announced that it would re-organize the MDN Editorial Department on August 1 with a new chief editor, and re-launch the MDN on September 1 as a more news-oriented site. Mainichi said, "We continued to post articles that contained incorrect information about Japan and indecent sexual content. These articles, many of which were not checked, should not have been dispatched to Japan or the world. We apologize deeply for causing many people trouble and for betraying the public's trust in the Mainichi Shimbun."

=== Japanese police racial profiling investigation ===
On April 30, 2024, an article was published by The Mainichi detailing how an investigation found that numerous police departments in Japan had a high rate of incidents involving racial profiling against foreigners. Since 2022, the number of people coming forward with police brutality complaints against Japan's National Police Agency had grown rapidly. One former officer inspector from a west Japan prefecture where local police were ordered by senior officers to target foreigners for questioning, ID checks and searches even claimed to the newspaper that "we were told to target foreigners." According to the former inspector, who used the pseudonym "Taro Yamada" when he spoke to The Mainichi, "Officers around me including my immediate superior often said things like, 'People with Black roots, Southeast Asians and so on study ways to kill people. So use your service revolver if you have to! You have no idea what they're going to do.'" Yamada also stated that officers in Japan "have to be careful patrolling" in an area with many Korean residents "because there's no telling what they'll do."

Yamada further stated that whites were not nearly as frequently targeted by Japanese police officers like people with "darker skin" are, stating that "I think that when police think of a 'foreigner,' they're not picturing someone (of European descent), but a person with darker skin, with Black or Southeast Asian roots and so on. I thought that way. Officers assume (light-skinned people) are tourists or have a Japanese partner. But with people with dark skin, they tend to assume they're visa overstayers."

== Offices ==
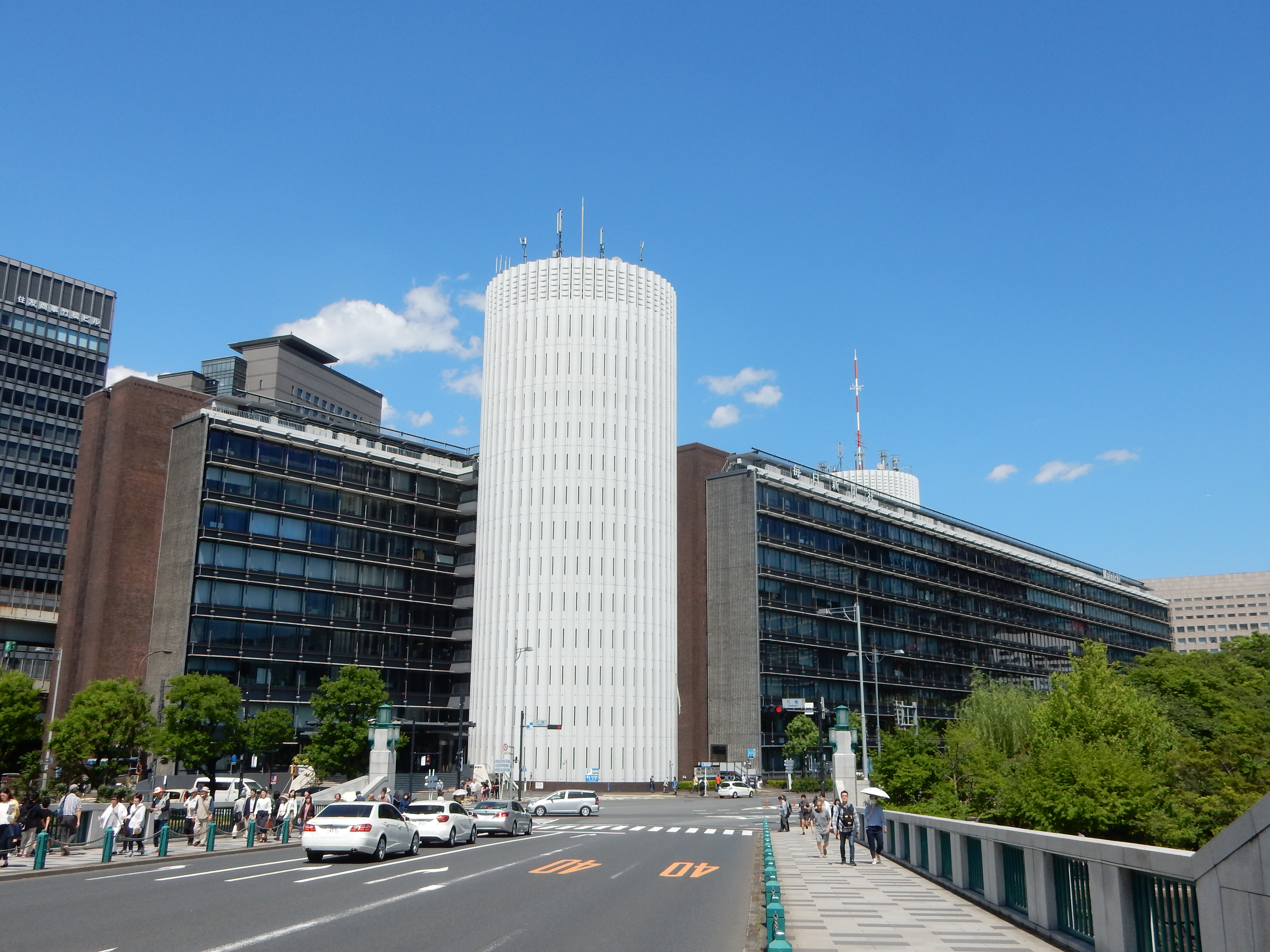
Palaceside Building, the headquarters of Mainichi Shimbun in Tokyo

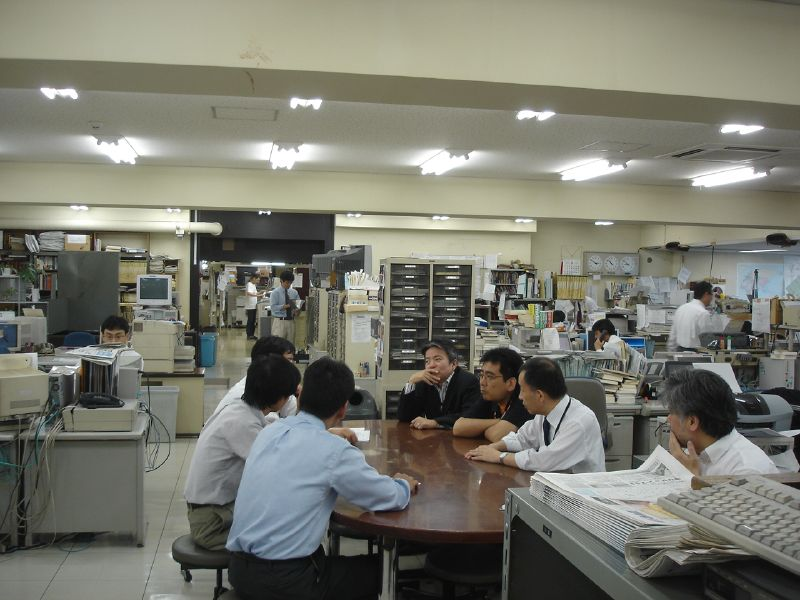
Newsroom at Mainichi Shimbun

- Tokyo Head Office (東京本社, Tōkyō Honsha), corporate headquarters

1-1-1, Hitotsubashi, Chiyoda, Tokyo

- Osaka Head Office (大阪本社, Ōsaka Honsha)

3-4-5, Umeda, Kita-ku, Osaka

- Chubu Head Office (中部本社, Chūbu Honsha)

Midland Square, 4-7-1, Meieki, Nakamura-ku, Nagoya

- Seibu Head Office (西部本社, Seibu Honsha)

13-1, Konya-machi, Kokura Kita-ku, Kitakyushu
1314 W. McDermott Dr, Allen (Dallas) Texas USA (Central Region)

== Sponsorship ==
Like other Japanese newspaper companies, Mainichi hosts many cultural events such as art exhibitions and sporting events. Among them, the most famous are the Senbatsu High School baseball tournament held every spring at Koshien Stadium, and the non-professional baseball tournaments held every summer in the Tokyo Dome (formerly held in Korakuen Stadium) and the end of the fall in the Osaka Dome.

The company sponsors a number of prominent annual road running competitions in Japan, including the Lake Biwa Marathon and the Beppu-Ōita Marathon.

== Notable contributors ==
- Yoshiko Miya

== See also ==
- Mainichi Film Awards – Series of annual film awards sponsored by Mainichi Shimbun
- Mainichi Kaasan – Japanese comedy manga series by Rieko Saibara
- Mass media in Japan

== Sources ==
- Honda, Katsuichi (1999) [Main text from Nankin e no Michi (The Road to Nanjing), 1987.], Gibney, Frank (ed.), The Nanjing Massacre: A Japanese Journalist Confronts Japan's National Shame, M. E. Sharpe, ISBN 0-7656-0335-7
- Kajimoto, Masato (July 2015), The Nanking Massacre: Nanking War Crimes Tribunal, Graduate School of Journalism of the University of Missouri-Columbia, 172, archived from the original on July 13, 2015, "However, as many historians point out today, the stories of hyped heroism, in which those soldiers courageously killed a number of enemies in hand-to-hand combat with swords, couldn't be taken at face value. ... The three researchers interviewed by author for this project, Daqing Yang, Ikuhiko Hata, and Akira Fujiwara said that the contest could have been mere mass murder of prisoners."
- Wakabayashi, Bob Tadashi (Summer 2000), "The Nanking 100-Man Killing Contest Debate: War Guilt Amid Fabricated Illusions, 1971–75", Journal of Japanese Studies, 26 (2), The Society for Japanese Studies: 307–340, doi:10.2307/133271, ISSN 0095-6848, JSTOR 133271
