= Tokyo Nichi Nichi Shimbun =

1872–1943 Japanese newspaper

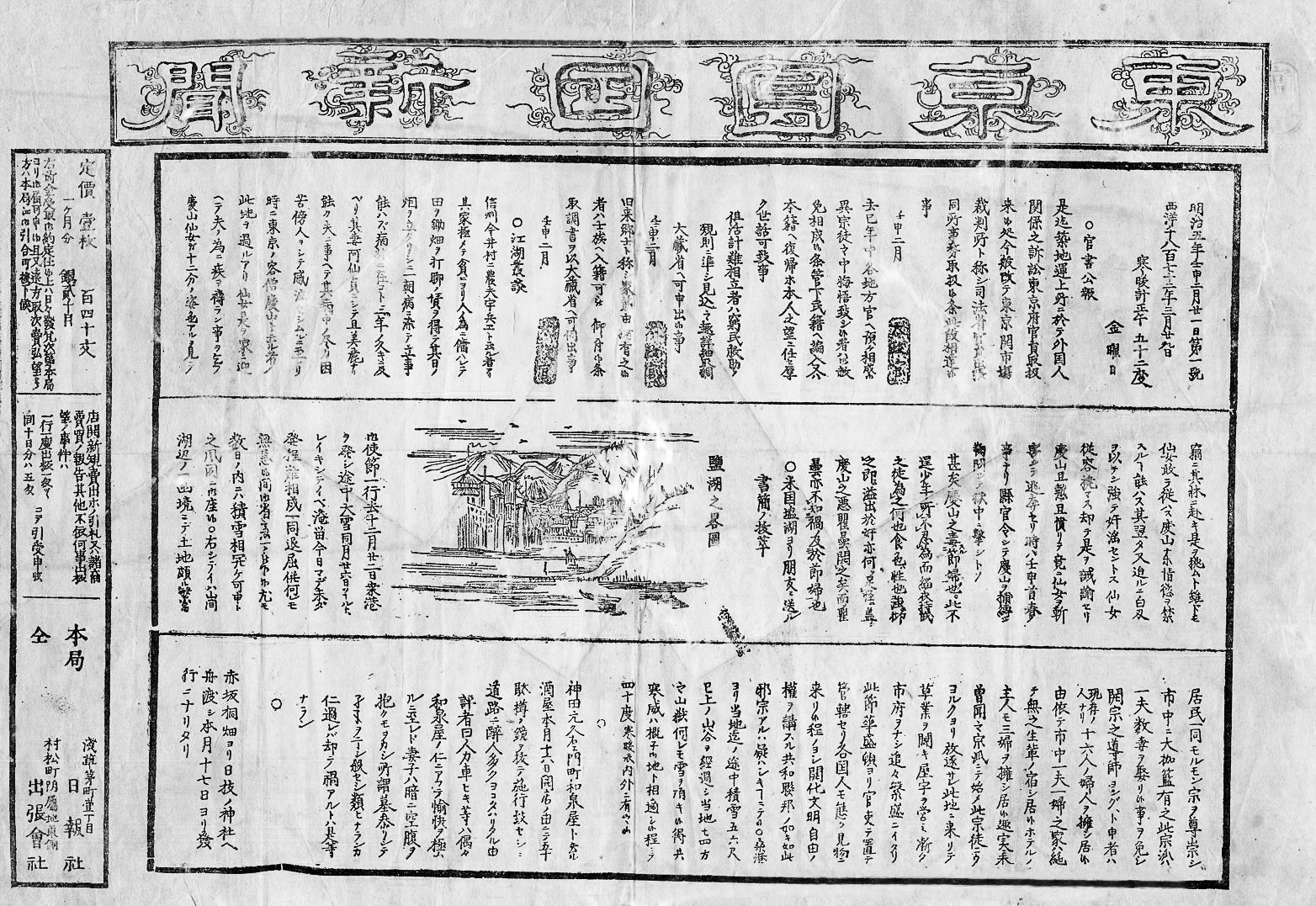
First edition of the Tokyo Nichi Nichi Shimbun on 21 February 1872

The Tokyo Nichi Nichi Shimbun (東京日日新聞, Tōkyō Nichi Nichi Shinbun) (lit. Tokyo Daily News) was a newspaper printed in Tokyo, Japan from 1872 to 1943.

In 1875, the company began the world's first newspaper delivery service.

In 1911, the paper merged with Osaka Mainichi Shimbun (大阪毎日新聞, lit. Osaka Daily News) to form the Mainichi Shimbun (毎日新聞, lit. "Daily News") company. The two newspapers continued to print independently until 1943, when both editions were placed under a Mainichi Shimbun masthead.

== Sino-Japanese War coverage controversy ==
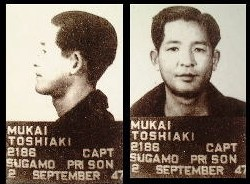
Mukai at Sugamo Prison after his arrest by the U.S. Army

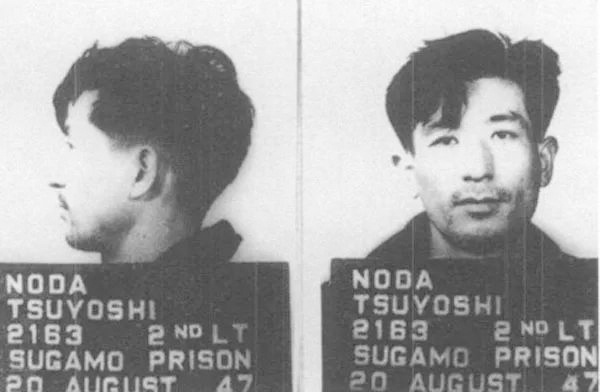
Noda at Sugamo Prison after his arrest by the U.S. Army

From November 30, 1937, to December 13, 1937, the Osaka Mainichi Shimbun and its sister newspaper the Tokyo Nichi Nichi Shimbun covered the hundred-man killing contest in four articles, with the last two translated in the Japan Advertiser. According to the reports, the two Japanese Army second lieutenants Toshiaki Mukai (向井 敏明) and Tsuyoshi Noda (野田 毅) were vying with one another to be the first to kill 100 people with a sword, as the Imperial Japanese Army advanced from Shanghai to Nanjing, prior to the infamous Nanjing Massacre.

According to the Tokyo Nichi Nichi Shimbun's report on December 13, 1937, Toshiaki Mukai said, "Without realising, we both surpassed 100 people. It was quite pleasant." Because it was difficult to determine which officer killed 100 people first and won the contest, according to journalists Asami Kazuo and Suzuki Jiro, they decided to begin another contest to kill 150 people with a sword, beginning on December 11th. The Nichi Nichi headline of the story on 13 December read, "Hundred-man killing 'super record': Mukai 106 – 105 Noda: The two second lieutenants to continue the contest in overtime".

Other soldiers and historians have noted the improbability of the lieutenants' heroics, which entailed killing enemy after enemy in fierce hand-to-hand combat. Noda himself, on returning to his hometown, admitted this during a speech that "I killed only four or five with sword in the real combat ... After we captured an enemy trench, we'd tell them, 'Ni Lai Lai.' (Note: "Ni Lai Lai" (Chinese: 你来来) can be translated as "you, come, come".) The Chinese soldiers were stupid enough to come out the trench toward us one after another. We'd line them up and cut them down from one end to the other."
