= Toshiaki Mukai =

Japanese Army officer

- 向井 敏明
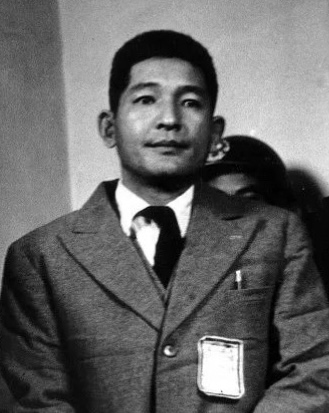
- Born: June 3, 1912; Yamaguchi, Japan
- Died: January 28, 1948 (aged 35); Nanjing, China
- Cause of death: Execution by shooting
- Occupation: Army officer
- Known for: Involvement in the hundred man killing contest
- Status: Executed
- Convictions: War crimes Crimes against humanity
- Penalty: Death

Toshiaki Mukai (向井 敏明, Mukai Toshiaki; June 3, 1912 – January 28, 1948) was a Japanese Army officer during the Second Sino-Japanese War. Mukai is best known for his involvement in the Nanking Massacre (1937–1938), where he was implicated in atrocities against Chinese civilians and prisoners of war. After Japan's surrender in World War II, he was tried for war crimes by the Nanjing War Crimes Tribunal and executed in 1948.

== Early life and military career ==
Mukai was born on June 3, 1912, in Yamaguchi Prefecture. He joined the Imperial Japanese Army in the early 1930s and was eventually promoted to the rank of Second Lieutenant. During the Second Sino-Japanese War, his unit participated in the Battle of Nanking in December 1937.

== Role in the Nanking Massacre ==
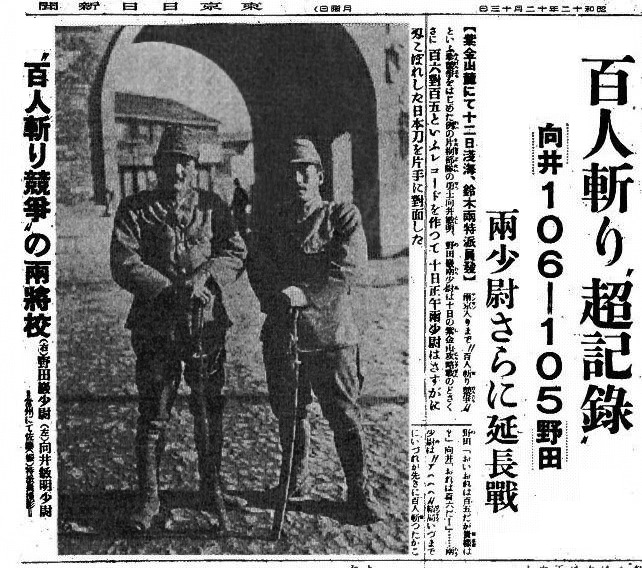
The Tokyo Nichi Nichi Shimbun's news coverage of the event on 13 December 1937. Mukai (left) and Noda (right).

During the Nanking Massacre, which lasted from December 1937 to January 1938, Mukai played a role in atrocities committed by the Japanese military. Over 200,000 civilians and prisoners of war were killed, and thousands of women were raped.

Mukai was reported to have taken part in the massacre, particularly in the execution of large groups of prisoners of war, as well as the hundred man killing contest. His actions included participation in shooting squads and overseeing the killing of Chinese captives. Although some details of his specific involvement remain under investigation, his name has been cited in survivor testimonies and tribunal records.

== Post-war trial and execution ==
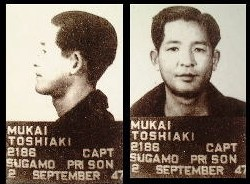
Mukai's mugshot

Following Japan's surrender in 1945, Mukai was arrested by Allied forces and handed over to the Chinese government. The Nanjing War Crimes Tribunal, part of the broader effort to hold Japanese war criminals accountable, tried Mukai for his involvement in the atrocities committed during the Nanking Massacre.

Mukai was found guilty of Class B war crimes under international law, which include crimes against humanity. On January 28, 1948, he was executed by firing squad in Nanjing.

== Legacy ==
Mukai’s execution and the trials of other Japanese officers at Nanjing serve as important milestones in the post-war reckoning of Japanese military atrocities. The Nanking Massacre remains a highly sensitive and controversial topic in China–Japan relations, with ongoing debates over historical memory and justice.
