= Taiyuan campaign =

1948–49 battle of the Chinese Civil War

- Part of the Chinese Civil War
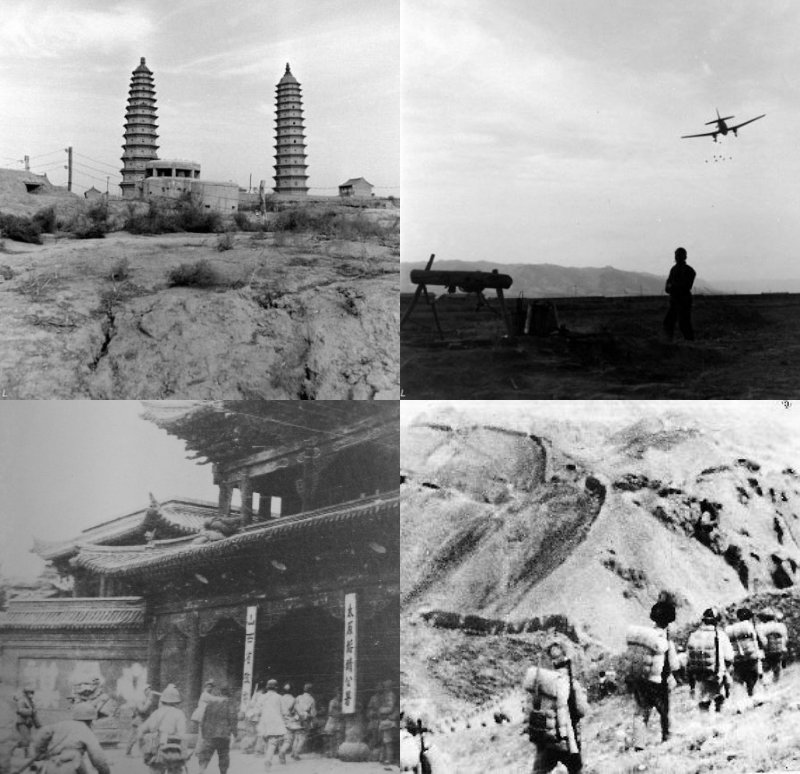
| Date | October 5, 1948 – April 24, 1949 (6 months, 2 weeks and 5 days) |
| Location | Taiyuan, Shanxi, China |
| Result | Communist victory |

Belligerents
| Flag of the National Revolutionary Army Republic of China Army | PLA People's Liberation Army |

Commanders and leaders
| (Republic of China (1912–1949)) Yan Xishan (Republic of China (1912–1949)) Sun Chu (POW) (Republic of China (1912–1949)) Wang Jingguo (POW) (Republic of China (1912–1949)) Liang Huazhi ‡‡ (Republic of China (1912–1949)) Imamura Hosaku ‡‡ | Xu Xiangqian; Peng Dehuai |

Strength
| 135,000 at Taiyuan; 10,000 at Datong | 320,000 |

Casualties and losses
| 135,000 at Taiyuan; 10,000 at Datong | 45,000 |

The Taiyuan campaign was a campaign of the Chinese Civil War fought between the nationalist and communist factions. The campaign was over the control of Taiyuan, the capital of the province of Shanxi, China. The campaign resulted in a communist victory.

== Prelude ==
After the end of the Central Shanxi campaign, the majority of the province had fallen into communist hands, and the Nationalists were left with only two cities in all of Shanxi: Taiyuan, the provincial capital, and Datong. In order to take control of the entire province, the Communists decided to launch the Taiyuan campaign in mid-October 1948. Communist commander Xu Xiangqian was put in charge, facing his adversary Yan Xishan, his Nationalist counterpart who had just suffered a humiliating defeat at Xu's hands in the Central Shanxi campaign. Yan appeared determined to fight to the end and repeatedly claimed in public that he would go down with the city of Taiyuan, but he would ultimately be airlifted to Nanjing. The Communists began concentrating their troops at places including Qingyuan (清原), Taigu (太谷), and Yuci (榆次) in preparation for the attack on the provincial capital.

== Order of battle ==
First Stage:

- Nationalists: 6 Armies totaling 20 Divisions
  - 14 infantry divisions
  - 3 Columns (Divisions)
  - 3 Specialized Divisions
- Communists:
  - Units of 7th Column
  - Units of 8th Column
  - Units of 13th Column
  - Units of 15th Column

Second Stage:

- Nationalists: 2 Corps totaling 6 armies
  - X Corps
  - XV Corps
- Communists:
  - Units of XVIII Corps
  - Units of XIX Corps
  - Units of XX Corps
  - Units of the 7th Army
  - Units of the 1st Artillery Division of the Fourth Field Army
  - Units of the 3rd Artillery Division of the communist North China Military Region

== Strategy ==
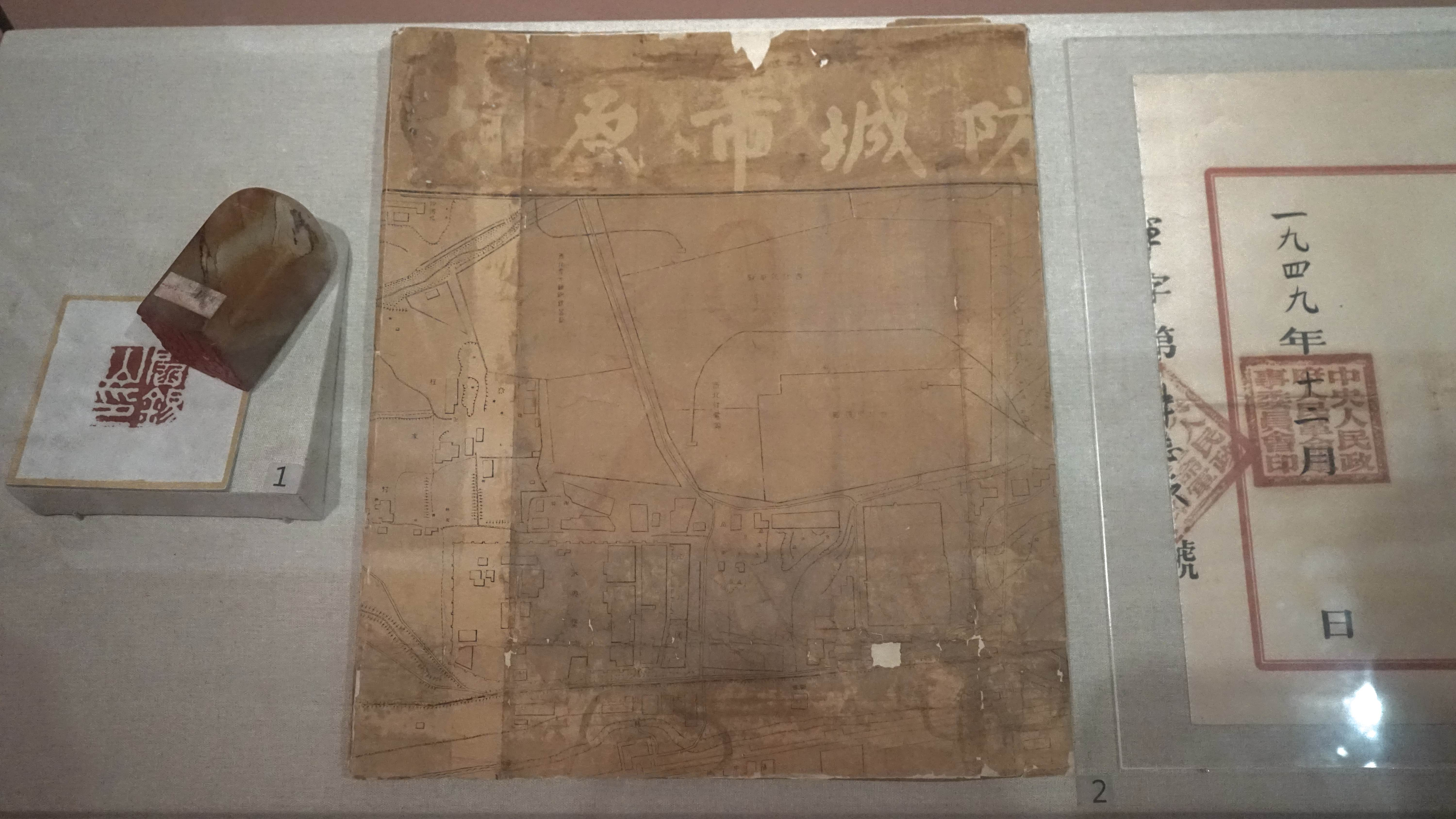
Defensive forces map of Taiyuan City NRA defense

The nationalist defenders had some significant advantages in terms of geography: the rugged mountainous terrain strongly favored the defenders and prevented large numbers of attackers from being effectively deployed. When the attackers were forced to reduce their numbers, they were furthered confronted by a large numbers of complexes of fortifications and bunkers. The nationalist defense parameter bordered by the Yellow Camp (Huang Zhai, 黄寨) and Zhou Family's Mountain (Zhou Jia Shan, 周家山) in the north, Wuxiu (武宿) and the Town of Little Hotel (Xiao Dian Zhen, 小店 镇) in the south, Rocky Thousand Peak (Shi Qian Feng, 石千峰) in the west, and Han (罕) Mountain in the east. Within this defense parameter, there were more than 5,000 large bunkers outside the city wall alone, and additionally, important positions such as regions of Ox and Camel Camp (Niu Tuo Zhai, 牛驼寨), Lesser Yaodong Head (Xiao Yao Tou, 小窑头), Mountain Peak (Shan Tou, 山头), and Zhuo Ma (淖马) to the east of the city, the Twin Pagoda Temple (Shuang Ta Si, 双塔寺) to the southeast of the city, and Crouching Tiger Mountain (Wo Hu Shan, 卧虎山) to the northeast of the city were all fortified as bunker complexes. The nationalist 30th Army was airlifted from Xi'an to Taiyuan to further strengthen the urban defense, while the total nationalist artillery pieces gathered for the defense of the city was more than six hundred.

The defenders of Taiyuan itself first divided the city into four sectors, the eastern, western, northern and southern sectors, but this was soon further split into five when the eastern sector was further divided into northeastern and southeastern sectors. A total of eleven divisions were tasked to defend these five defensive sectors while another six divisions were used as mobile strike force. The rest three divisions were used as reserves. To counter the nationalist defense, on September 28, 1948, Xu Xiangqian decided the communist strategy of gradually annihilating the defenders in the outskirt of the city, hopefully when they were out of their fortifications, and then to take the city. The first step was to breach the nationalist defense from southeast and northwest, and preventing the use of the two airports by artillery bombardment. The second step would be taking the nationalist strongholds of Mountain Peak (Shan Tou, 山头), Zhuo Ma (淖马), the Twin Pagoda Temple (Shuang Ta Si, 双塔寺) and others, and the last step was to take the city from northeast and southeast.

== First stage ==
In order to strengthen the defense of Taiyuan, Yan Xishan had to take as much food and able-bodies recruits as possible from the rural area, so on October 2, 1948, he sent out seven nationalist divisions to do so, and these divisions pushed southward in the region between the Fen River in the east and Tianjin-Pukou Railway in the west. By the next day, the nationalist 44th Division, 45th Division and units of the nationalist 72nd Division reached the region of the town around Little Hotel (Xiao Dian, 小店) and the Village of Southwestern Shore (Xi Nan Ban Cun, 西南畔村) while the nationalist 40th Division, 49th Division, and the 73rd Division reached the region of Autumn Village (Qiu Cun, 秋村) and Western Warm Village (Xi Wen Zhuang, 西温庄), and the nationalist 66th Division and the 69th Division reached the region of Red Temple (Hong Si, 红寺). The communists decided to take this great opportunity of striking the enemy out in the open when they came out of their fortifications by launching the Taiyuan campaign ahead of the original planned schedule.

At the dawn of October 5, 1948, the communist 7th Column crossed the Fen River at Qingyuan (清原), and struck eastward to the region north of the town of Little Hotel (Xiao Dian, 小店). In conjunction with the communist 7th Column striking eastward strike, the communist 15th Column struck westward to the north of Wuxiu (武宿) Airport from Tai Gu (太谷) and Yu Ci, (榆次), thus cutting off the escape route of the nationalist forces at Wuxiu (武宿) Airport and Little Hotel (Xiao Dian, 小店) region to Taiyuan. The communist 8th Column and 13th Column besieged the nationalist forces that had just taken regions of Little Hotel (Xiao Dian, 小店) and Southern Black Yaodong, (Nan Hei Yao, 南黑窑). By the early morning of October 6, 1948, the nationalist 44th Division and 45th Division were completely annihilated, while the nationalist 49th Division and 72nd Division were badly mauled. Riding on these successes, the communist took Wuxiu (武宿) Airport and approached the nationalist positions at Eastern Mountain (Dong Shan, 东山) from its southern flank. In accordance with the communist offensive in the Little Hotel (Xiao Dian, 小店) region, communist 7th Column launched its own offensive against nationalists positions at the Phoenix Pavilion Ridge (Feng Ge Liang, 凤阁梁) to the north of the city, annihilating a regiment of the nationalist 68th Division and a battalion of the nationalist 39th Division, and shelled the New Urban (Xin Cheng, 新城) Airport to the north of the city. After eleven days of fierce battle, three nationalist divisions were badly mauled, suffering over 12,000 casualties, and the enemy was at the first defensive line of the city. Both sides took a brief break for regrouping.

On October 16, 1948, units of the communist 7th Column, 8th Column, 13th Column, and 15th Column attacked nationalists positions at Eastern Mountain (Dong Shan, 东山) simultaneously from both the south and the north. By October 19, 1948, nationalist stronghold at Eastern Mountain (Dong Shan, 东山) including positions at Black Camel (Hei Tuo, 黑驼), Stone Person Ridge (Shi Ren Liang, 石人梁), Greater Yaodong Head, (Da Yao Tou, 大窑头), Greater and Lesser Northern Point (Da Xiao Bei Jian, 大小北尖), Elm Grove Level Ground (Yu Lin Ping, 榆林坪), Meng's Family's Well (Meng Jia Jing, 孟家井), and Ox and Camel Camp (Niu Tuo Zhai, 牛驼寨). The defenders of the main peak of the Eastern Mountain (Dong Shan, 东山), Mt. Rear (Han Shan, 罕山), consisted of a regiment, was forced to surrender. Yan Xishan deployed the nationalist 30th Army and the 10th Column (Division) consisted of former Japanese troops to launch continuous counterattacks on the communist 7th Column under the artillery coverage, which averaged over 10,000 per day on a position that was merely three hundred square meters. After three days of fierce fighting and suffering extreme heavy casualties, the nationalists were finally able to dislodge the enemy and take back the position. However, the enemy would not give up so easily and was determined to take the position. By October 26, 1948, the communists readjusted their tactics and deployed units of the communist 7th Column, 8th Column, 13th Column, and 15th Column to once again take nationalist positions at Ox and Camel Camp (Niu Tuo Zhai, 牛驼寨), Lesser Yaodong Head (Xiao Yao Tou, 小窑头), Mountain Peak (Shan Tou, 山头), and Zhuo Ma (淖马). With air support, the defenders attempted to counterattack but without success, and even with the deployment of gas attack and incendiary rounds, the enemy was able to have the newly gained positions firmly in their hands.

After fierce battles of nineteen days, by November 13, 1948, all four nationalist strongholds at Eastern Mountain (Dong Shan, 东山) had been taken and in addition to the 22,000+ casualties suffered, the defenders also lost an entire division when the nationalist 8th Column (Division) defected to the communist side. Meanwhile, units from the communist Central Shanxi Military Region also the town of Green Dragon (Qing Long Zhen, 青龙镇) to the north of the city, the Temple of Xu (Xu Tan, 许坛) to the south of the city, and the South-North Dyke (Nan Bei Yan, 南北堰) on the western bank of Fen River, thus further isolated the defenders by strengthening the siege. The nationalist commander of the 30th Army, Huang Jiaosong (黄樵松), was disillusioned with the nationalist regime and decided to defect, and the communists sent liaison officers into the city to help. However, the conspirators were sold out by one of Huang's subordinates, a divisional commander named Dai Bingnan (戴炳南) and everyone involved was arrested. Based on the letters captured, Yan Xishan erroneously believed that the lead communist liaison officer, Jin Fu (晋夫) was Hu Yaobang, and eventually sent all of the captured conspirators to Chiang Kai-shek, who had all of them executed after failing to obtain any information from them. However, nationalists had committed a serious blunder that would cost them dearly for the rest of the Chinese Civil War: Commander Dai Bingnan (戴炳南) was paid in huge amount of gold for his action but he was not allowed to be evacuated when the fall of the city was imminent. After the fall of the city, Dai Bingnan (戴炳南) attempted to hide under a table in a house and carried the gold on him, but of course he was captured by the communists. After the much publicized propaganda of his capture and a humiliating public trial, Dai Bingnan (戴炳南) was executed in public. The nationalist failure to save lives of informers such as Dai Bingnan (戴炳南) had greatly alienated those within the nationalist own ranks, and since then, most showed their objection to defection by either not joining in or leaving the defecting nationalist units, instead of revealing the conspirators. The idea to leave those informers behind was that since they had no way out, they would fight to the death in the face of communist attack, but this idea rumored to be approved by Chiang had backfired seriously, as proven later in many other similar incidents in the rest of the Chinese Civil War.

After the end of Liaoshen campaign, the nationalist force in North China headed by Fu Zuoyi became almost exposed and isolated. The communists feared that if the city of Taiyuan was taken too early which would lead to the complete exposure isolation of the nationalist force in North China, the nationalists would withdraw and avoid annihilation. Furthermore, if the nationalist force in North China was redeployed elsewhere in China, the communists would have great difficulties later on. As a result, a decision was made to temporarily stop the offensive on the city to finish Pingjin campaign first, and then take Taiyuan afterward. While the order was given on November 16, 1948, to stop the assault on the city itself, preparation was also done to further isolate the city. The I Corps of the communist North China Military Region acted accordingly by taking nationalist strongholds to the north of the city, including the Village of Su (Su Cun, 苏村), Yangqu (阳曲), Orchid Village (Lan Cun, 兰村), and nationalist strongholds to the south of the city, including Huaqitou (化七头), Zhao Family's Village (Zhao Jia Shan, 赵家山), Qi's Ditch (Qi Gou, 邱沟), and nationalist stronghold to the east of the city, the Pine Tree Slope (Song Shu Po, 松树坡). While the defenders were forced into a region of 15 km centered at the city, the communists stopped their offensives and launched another round of psychological warfare by stepping up the political pressure and sending the relatives of the defenders to the front to ask the defenders to surrender. As a result, from December 1, 1948, thru March, 1949, over 12,000 defenders defected to the communists.

== Second stage ==
After the end of Pingjin campaign, the I Corps, II Corps, and III Corps of the communist North China Military Region were renamed as the XVIII Corps, XIX Corps, and XX Corps respectively, while the 7th Column of the communist Northwest Field Army was renamed as the 7th Army of the First Field Army. In March, 1949, the communist XIX Corps, XX Corps, an artillery division of the Fourth Field Army and another artillery division of the communist North China Military Region were sent to Taiyuan to assist the communist XIX Corps in taking the city. On March 17, 1949, the communists formed the Taiyuan Frontline Command headed by Xu Xiangqian to coordinated the upcoming attack on the city, and Xu was further assisted by Peng Dehuai when he joined the Xu on March 28, 1949. The total communist force totaled more than 320,000, achieving absolute numerical superiority. However, the communists soon realized that due to the mountainous terrain of Taiyuan that strongly favored the defenders, the increased number of communist troops only provided excellent target practice for the defenders of the city because the harsh terrain had prevented large number of attacking force from being deployed in great numbers. In order to avoid wasteful casualties, the communists were forced to reduce their attacking force back to the original level of 100,000 troops in the first stage of the Taiyuan campaign while the rest were deployed as reserves. However, the newly boosted force did provide a welcome relief for communist veterans of the first stage of the campaign, and they were replaced by the fresh communist forces newly arrived.

In the first stage of the Taiyuan campaign, Yan Xishan had lost over 40,000 troops, but he was able to rapidly replace the loss with large scale drafting, and decided to fight the communists to proclaiming that he would die with the (Taiyuan) city. The nationalist 83rd Division was airlifted from Yulin, Shaanxi to Taiyuan, and the nationalist force defending the city totaled more than 70,000 troops in six armies, which was reorganized into two corps: the nationalist X Corps and the nationalist XV Corps. A total of twelve divisions were deployed in nationalist strongholds outside the city wall and two divisions were deployed within the city, while the rest of the division served as mobil strike force. However, Yan Xishan was well aware the end was near and he was by no means of having any confidence in the defense of the city and his public proclamation was nothing other than morale boosting only showpiece. On February 5, 1949, Yan Xishan betrayed his promise of dying with the city by fleeing the city via air, and left his trusted lieutenants, Sun Chu (孙楚), the commander of the nationalist X Corps and Wang Jingguo (王靖国), the commander of the nationalist XV Corps as the commander-in-chief and the deputy commander-in-chief of the urban defense of Taiyuan. On March 31, 1949, the communist Frontline Command of Taiyuan decided to take good positions that could be used to assault the city by first continuously isolating and annihilating defenders in nationalist strongholds outside the city wall, and then taking the city by concentrating available forces. Units of the communist XX Corps and a division from the communist 7th Army would attack the defenders in the nationalist stronghold to the north of the city from northeast and northwest, and other divisions of the communist 7th Army and units of the communist XVIII Corps would attack the city from the east, and units of the communist XIX Corps would attack the city from south and southwest, while the communist XX Corps would attack the city from northeast and southeast. The 1st Artillery Division of the Fourth Field Army and the 3rd Artillery Division of the communist North China Military Region would be under the direct command of the communist Taiyuan Frontline Command, while the 4th Artillery Division of the communist North China Military Region would be attached to the communist XIX Corps and XX Corps.

On April 20, 1949, a general assault was launched and with strong artillery support, nationalist strongholds including New City (Xin Cheng, 新城), Crown Price's Head (Tai Zi Tou, 太子头) to the north of the city, Northern Fen River Bridge (Bei Fen He Qiao, 北汾河桥), Greater King's Village (Da Wang Cun, 大王村), Lesser King's Village (Xiao Wang Cun, 小王村) to the southwest of the city, Village of Di (Di Cun, 狄村) and Old Soldiers' Camp (Lao Jun Ying, 老军营) to the south of the city, Hao Family's Ditch (Hao Jia Guo, 郝家沟) and Scissors Bay (Jian Zi Wan, 剪子湾) to the east of the city. By April 22, 1949, the last nationalist stronghold outside the city wall had fallen into the enemy hands and the communists had completely annihilated four nationalist armies garrisoning these strongholds. The communist success meant that two critical locations, the two highest points, the Twin Pagoda Temple (Shuang Ta Si, 双塔寺) and Crouching Tiger Mountain (Wo Hu Shan, 卧虎山) were controlled by the attacking enemy. On April 22, the communists asked the surviving nationalist defenders of the city to surrender in order to minimize the destruction of the city, but their request was refused. In the early morning of April 24, 1949, after shelling the city with over 1,300 artilleries, the final assault on the city begun. The communist XX Corps first breached the city defense at the city wall to the east of the Lesser Northern Gate (Xiao Bei Men, 小北门), and the communist XVIII Corps and XIX Corps soon breached the city defense elsewhere, and fierce street fights broke out within the city. By 9:00 a.m., the nationalist headquarter had fallen and the nationalist commander-in-chief Sun Chu (孙楚) and his deputy Wang Jingguo (王靖 国) were both captured alive along with their Japanese advisory group headed by Nakamura and Iwata by the attacking communists. By 10:00 a.m., the fighting ended and the campaign concluded with a communist victory.

== Outcome ==
The nationalist defeat in the Taiyuan campaign cost the nationalists over 135,000 troops and the most immediate result of the campaign was that the nationalist garrison at Datong totaling more than 10,000 realized that it was all over after witnessing the nationalist defeat in Taiyuan, and surrendered to the communists without a fight. The Communist victory cost them 45,000 troops plus many civilian laborers. The Taiyuan campaign not only ended the 38-year-old reign of Yan Xishan, but also effectively ended Nationalist rule of Shanxi. In their last act, the Provincial Government with the remaining 500 officials committed mass suicide by cyanide pills, and burned down a prison complex filled with Communist prisoners of war.

== See also ==
- Outline of the Chinese Civil War
- National Revolutionary Army
- People's Liberation Army
- History of the People's Liberation Army
