= Hong Kong Defence Force =

Hong Kong Defence Force may refer to:

- Hong Kong Defence Force (Imperial Japanese Army), the Japanese garrison between 1942 and 1945
- British Forces Overseas Hong Kong, until 1997
  - Royal Hong Kong Regiment
- Hong Kong Garrison, the Chinese People's Liberation Army force in Hong Kong since 1997
