= Hitoshi Imamura =

Japanese officer and war criminal (1886–1968)

- 今村 均
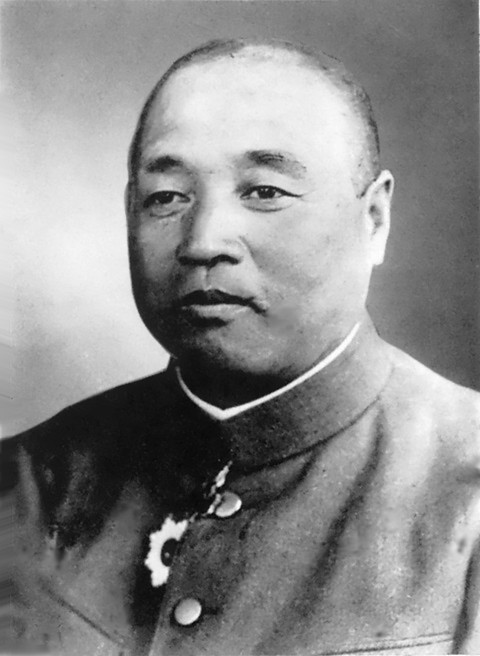
- Born: 28 June 1886; Sendai District, Miyagi Prefecture, Empire of Japan
- Died: 4 October 1968 (aged 82); Setagaya, Tokyo, Japan
- Relatives: Imamura Hosaku (brother)
- Military career
- Allegiance: Empire of Japan
- Branch: Imperial Japanese Army
- Service years: 1907–1945
- Rank: General
- Unit: 4th Infantry Regiment
- Commands: 5th Division; Twenty-Third Army; Sixteenth Army; Eighth Area Army
- Conflicts: Second Sino-Japanese War; World War II; New Guinea campaign; Solomon Islands campaign
- Awards: Order of the Golden Kite, Order of the Rising Sun
- Other work: Writer

Hitoshi Imamura (今村 均, Imamura Hitoshi; 28 June 1886 – 4 October 1968) was a Japanese general who served in the Imperial Japanese Army during World War II. As the commander of the 8th Area Army based in Rabaul, Papua New Guinea, he governed occupied New Guinea.

Following the war, he was subsequently convicted of war crimes. Finding his punishment to be too light, Imamura built a replica of his prison in his garden and confined himself there until his death.

== Early career ==
A native of Sendai, Miyagi Prefecture, Imamura's father was a judge. Imamura graduated from the Imperial Japanese Army Academy in 1907 and was commissioned a second lieutenant in the infantry on 26 December 1907. He was promoted to lieutenant in November 1910 and attended the Army War College in 1915. He was promoted to captain in 1917 and was sent to England as a military attaché the following year. He was promoted to major in August 1922 and to lieutenant-colonel in August 1926. In April 1927, he was appointed as a military attaché to British India. Promoted to colonel on 1 August 1930, he held staff positions in the operations section of the Imperial Japanese Army General Staff from 1931 to 1932.

His younger brother was Imamura Hosaku, an officer in the Kwantung Army who fought in the Chinese Civil War as a mercenary for the Kuomintang.

== Wars in China ==
With the January 28 incident of 1932, he was sent to take command of the Imperial Japanese Army (IJA) 57th Infantry Regiment. On his return to Japan, he became commandant of the Narashino Army School from 1932 to 1935.

In March 1935, Imamura was promoted from regimental commander to brigade commander of the IJA 40th Infantry Brigade with the rank of major general. He was assigned as deputy chief of staff of the Kwantung Army in Manchukuo in March 1936. He was recalled to Japan to assume the post of commandant of the Toyama Army Infantry School from 1937 to 1938.

Promoted to the rank of lieutenant general in March 1938, Imamura was given command of the IJA 5th Division based in China, which he continued to command in the early stages of the Second Sino-Japanese War to 1940. From 1940 to 1941, he was Deputy Inspector-General of Military Training, deputy to one of the most powerful officials in the Japanese Army. He was subsequently appointed commander in chief of the Twenty Third Army.

== Pacific War ==
Imamura became the commander of the Sixteenth Army in November 1941 and was directed to lead that army in the invasion of the Dutch East Indies. As his fleet approached Java, his transport, the Shinshu (Ryujo) Maru, was sunk by torpedoes, probably by friendly fire, in the Battle of Sunda Strait and he was forced to swim to shore.

Imamura adopted an unusually lenient policy towards the local population of the former Dutch East Indies (present-day Indonesia), which was often in conflict with general opinions and plans of the senior staff of the Southern Army and Imperial General Headquarters. However, his policies won much support from the population (particularly in Java, where he was based) and helped to mildly reduce the difficulties of the Japanese military occupation.

In late 1942, he assumed command of the new Eighth Area Army, responsible for the Seventeenth Army in the Solomon Islands campaign and the Eighteenth Army in the New Guinea campaign. Imamura was then based at Rabaul in New Britain. Imamura was promoted to general in 1943.

== Trial for war crimes, imprisonment, and self-imprisonment ==
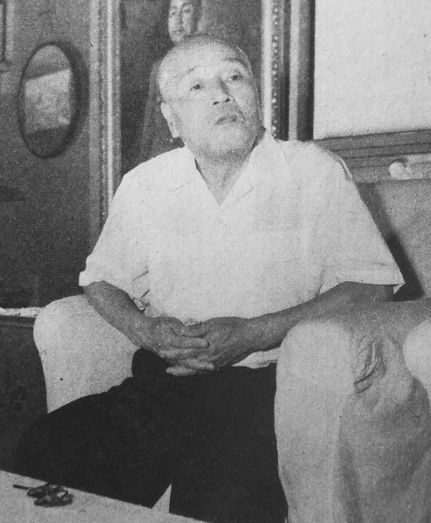
Hitoshi Imamura in 1955

Along with the naval commander at Rabaul, Vice Admiral Jinichi Kusaka, Imamura surrendered the Japanese forces in New Guinea and the southern Pacific Islands to Australian forces, representing the Allies, in September 1945. Imamura was detained at Rabaul by the Australian Army, as he and troops under his command were accused of war crimes, including the execution of Allied prisoners of war. One infamous example, called the "pig-basket atrocity", occurred when prisoners captured in eastern Java were transported in bamboo baskets used for pigs.

In April 1946, Imamura wrote to the Australian commander at Rabaul, requesting that his own trial for war crimes be expedited in order to speed the prosecution of war criminals under his command. Imamura was charged with "unlawfully [disregarding and failing] to discharge his duty ... to control the members of his command, whereby they committed brutal atrocities and other high crimes."

He was tried by an Australian military court at Rabaul on 1–16 May 1947; he was convicted and sentenced to imprisonment for ten years. Imamura served his imprisonment at Sugamo Prison in Tokyo until he was released in 1954. He considered his imprisonment too light with respect to his responsibility for the crimes of his subordinates, so he had a replica of the prison built in his garden, and he stayed there until his death in 1968.

The House of Confinement was moved to Nirasaki, Yamanashi in 1990, where it is currently preserved.

Military offices
Preceded by Rikichi Andō	Commander of 5th Division; 1938–1940	Succeeded by Aketo Nakamura
Preceded by none	Commander of 23rd Army; 1941	Succeeded by Takashi Sakai
Preceded by none	Commander of 16th Army; 1941–1942	Succeeded by Kumakichi Harada
Preceded by none	Commander of Eighth Area Army; 1942–1945	Succeeded by none
