= Imamura Hosaku =

Japanese military officer (1900–1949)

Hōsaku Imamura
- 今村 方策
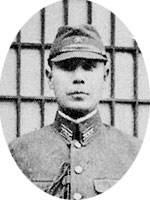
- Born: January 4, 1900; Sendai, Miyagi Prefecture, Japan
- Died: April 24, 1949 (aged 49); Taiyuan, Shanxi, China
- Education: Imperial Japanese Army Academy
- Relatives: Hitoshi Imamura (brother)
- Military career
- Allegiance: Empire of Japan; Yan Xishan
- Branch: Imperial Japanese Army; National Revolutionary Army
- Rank: Lieutenant-general
- Conflicts: Second Sino-Japanese War; Chinese Civil War; Taiyuan campaign ‡‡

Imamura Hōsaku (今村 方策, Hōsaku Imamura; January 4, 1900 – April 24, 1949) was a Japanese military officer in the Kwantung Army who was most notable for staying in China after the surrender of Japan on August 15, 1945. He and many of his fellow Japanese soldiers became mercenaries in the employ of the pro-Nationalist warlord of Shanxi, Yan Xishan, after the resumption of the Chinese Civil War. Imamura fought against the Communist forces until his death in battle in the closing weeks of the civil war.

== Personal background ==
Imamura was born on January 4, 1900, in Sendai, Miyagi Prefecture. His father was a judge. He graduated from the Imperial Japanese Army Academy in 1913. Imamura reached the rank of lieutenant-general in the Kwantung Army.

His older brother was Imamura Hitoshi, a general in the Japanese Army who was Deputy Chief of Staff in the Kwantung Army in the 1930s and later served as the commander of the Japanese Sixteenth Army, which invaded the Dutch East Indies.

== The Chinese Civil War ==
Imamura served at the rank of general in Yan Xishan's Nationalist army, and defended Taiyuan, the capital of Shanxi. In April, 1949, the Communists launched a final attack against Taiyuan's last defenders that included over 1,300 pieces of artillery and a force three times larger than the Nationalist defenders. Yan Xishan himself (along with most of the provincial treasury) was airlifted out of Taiyuan in March 1949 to ask Chiang Kai-shek for more supplies. He left his son-in-law, Wang Jingguo, and Imamura in charge of his forces.

Shortly after Yan was airlifted out of Taiyuan, Nationalist planes stopped dropping food and supplies for the defenders due to fears of being shot down by the advancing Communists. The Communists launched a major assault on April 20, 1949, and succeeded in taking all positions surrounding Taiyuan by April 22. The Communists appealed to the defenders to surrender, a plea which was rejected by Wang and Imamura. On the morning of April 22, 1949, the PLA bombarded Taiyuan with 1,300 pieces of artillery and breached the city's walls, initiating bloody street-to-street fighting for control of the city. At 10:00 am, April 22, the Taiyuan campaign ended with the Communists in complete control of Shanxi. Total Nationalist casualties amounted to all 145,000 defenders, many of whom were taken as POWs.

Imamura and many of his fellow Japanese volunteers committed suicide rather than surrender. Wang was captured alive and was last seen being led through the streets at the end of a rope.
