= Twenty-Third Army (Japan) =

Japanese Twenty-Third Army
- Active: June 26, 1941 - August 15, 1945
- Country: Empire of Japan
- Branch: Imperial Japanese Army
- Type: Infantry
- Role: Corps
- Garrison/HQ: Guangdong
- Engagements: Second Sino-Japanese War

Commanders
- Notable commanders: Hitoshi Imamura; Takashi Sakai; Hisakazu Tanaka

The Japanese 23rd Army (第23軍, Dai-nijyusan gun) was an army of the Imperial Japanese Army during World War II.

== History ==
The Japanese 23rd Army was established on June 26, 1941, under the command of the Imperial General Headquarters. It was transferred to the control of the China Expeditionary Army on August 12 of the same year. It was based in Guangdong province and on Hainan Island to replace the Southern China Area Army which was disbanded June 26, 1941.

The Japanese 23rd Army was primarily a garrison force to deter the possible landings of Allied forces in southern China. It was involved in the Battle of Guilin-Liuzhou (part of Operation Ichi-Go) from August–November 1944. The Japanese 23rd Army surrendered to the Chinese Kuomintang forces on August 15, 1945, with the surrender of Japan and was disbanded in Guangzhou.

After the war, Imamura, Sakai, and Tanaka were all tried and convicted of war crimes. Sakai and Tanaka were tried in China and executed, while Imamura received a life sentence from an Australian military court. He was released in 1954. Viewing his own sentence as too lenient, Imamura built his own prison in which he imprisoned himself until his death in 1967.

== List of Commanders ==
=== Commanding officer ===
| | Name | From | To |
|---|---|---|---|
| 1 | General Hitoshi Imamura | 28 June 1941 | 6 November 1941 |
| 2 | Lt. General Takashi Sakai | 6 November 1941 | 1 March 1943 |
| 3 | Lt. General Hisaichi Tanaka | 1 March 1943 | 9 September 1945 |

=== Chief of staff ===
| | Name | From | To |
|---|---|---|---|
| 1 | Lt. General Seizo Arisue | 28 June 1941 | 15 September 1941 |
| 2 | Lt. General Tadamichi Kuribayashi | 15 September 1941 | 10 June 1943 |
| 3 | Major General Yosuke Adachi | 10 June 1943 | 16 December 1944 |
| 4 | Major General Katsunobu Uzawa | 16 December 1944 | 15 April 1945 |
| 5 | Major General Naosuke Tomita | 15 April 1945 | 1 September 1945 |

== See also ==
- Hong Kong Defence Force (Imperial Japanese Army)
