= Masaichi Niimi =

Japanese admiral

Vice admiral Masaichi Niimi
- 新見 政一
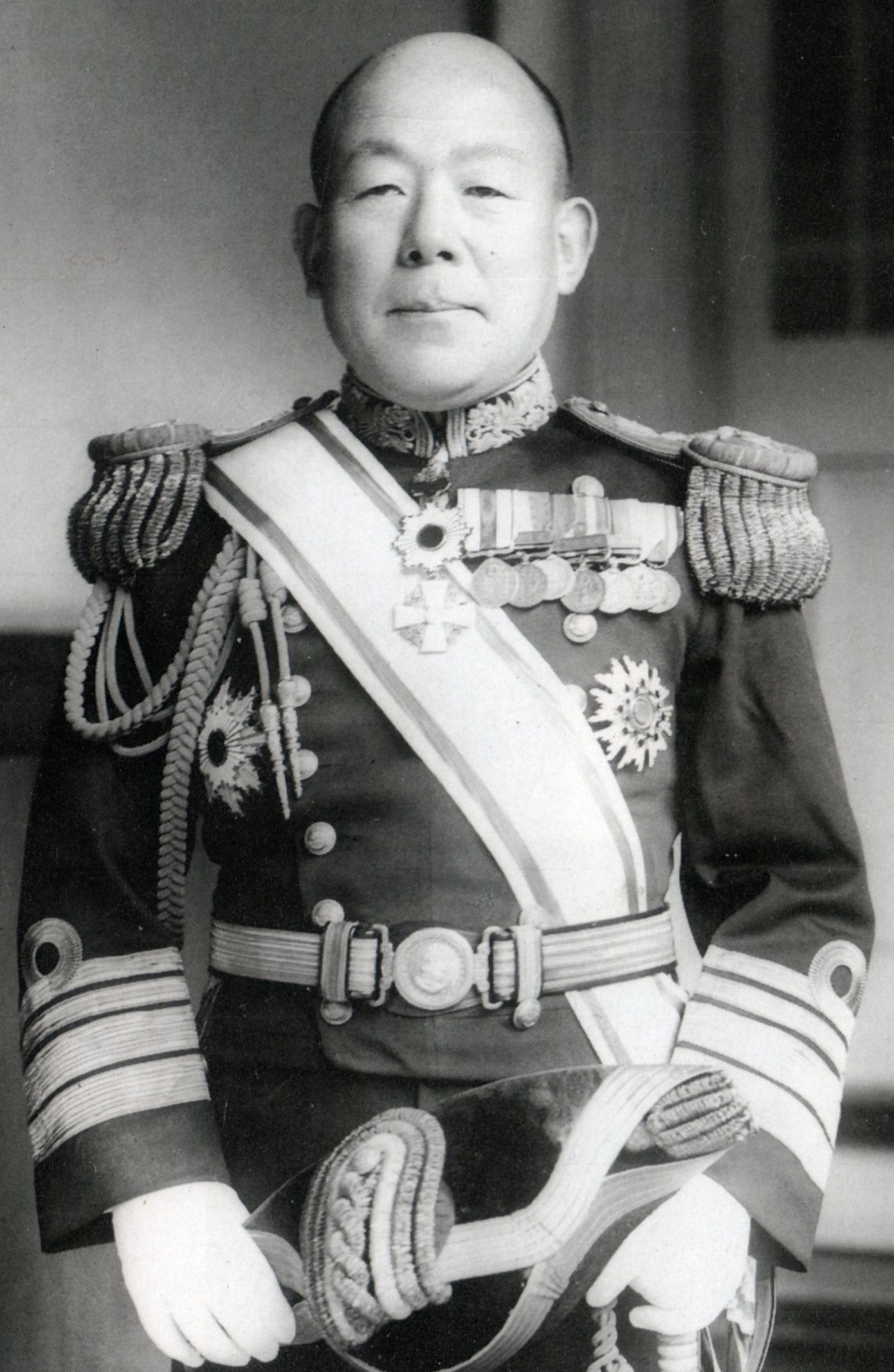

Governor of Hong Kong under Japanese occupation
- In office 25 December 1941 – 20 February 1942 Serving with Takashi Sakai
- Monarch: Shōwa
- Prime Minister: Hideki Tōjō
- Preceded by: Sir Mark Aitchison Young
- Succeeded by: Rensuke Isogai

Personal details
- Born: 4 February 1887 Hiroshima, Japan
- Died: 2 April 1993 (aged 106)
- Awards: Grand Cordon of the Order of the Sacred Treasure (July 1942); Order of the Rising Sun (2nd Class) (1936)

Military service
- Allegiance: Empire of Japan
- Branch/service: Imperial Japanese Navy
- Years of service: 1908–1944
- Rank: Vice Admiral
- Commands: Ōi, Yakumo, Maya, Naval Education Bureau, Naval Academy, 2nd China Expeditionary Fleet, Maizuru Naval District
- Battles/wars: World War I; World War II; Battle of Hong Kong

Vice-Admiral Masaichi Niimi (新見 政一, Niimi Masaichi; 4 February 1887 – 2 April 1993) was an admiral in the Imperial Japanese Navy during World War II.

== Life and naval career ==
Niimi was born in what is now Asakita Ward, Hiroshima City, in Hiroshima Prefecture, as the second son to a farming and soy sauce producing family. He entered the Imperial Japanese Naval Academy on 2 December 1905 and graduated from its 36th class on 21 November 1908, ranking 15th out of 191 cadets. As a midshipman, he served on the cruisers Aso and Izumo. He was commissioned an ensign on 15 January 1910 and promoted to sub-lieutenant on 1 December 1911.

He attended naval artillery and torpedo school in 1910, and was then assigned back to the Aso, followed by the destroyer Yayoi.

Promoted to lieutenant on 1 December 1914, he served on the cruiser Katori, battlecruiser Ibuki, battleship Kawachi and destroyer Umikaze. He attended the Naval War College (Japan) in 1917, specializing in naval artillery, graduating fourth in his class of 24 on 26 November 1919. He then became chief gunnery officer on the battleship Ise and was promoted to lieutenant commander on 1 December 1920. He was sent to the United Kingdom as a naval attaché from 1923–1925, during which time he was further promoted to commander on 1 December 1924. In 1922, he wrote a report to the Navy General Staff on the importance of protecting merchant shipping in times of war.

On his return to Japan, he was assigned as executive officer on the cruiser Kuma in 1926. He was promoted to captain on 30 November 1929. On 1 April 1931, he was given his first command: the cruiser Ōi. He subsequently served as captain of the cruisers Yakumo and Maya.

Niimi was promoted to rear admiral on 15 November 1935. In 1937, he accompanied Prince Chichibu to England for the Coronation Ceremonies of King George VI, afterwards visiting France, Germany and the United States. After serving as chief of staff of the Kure Naval District and of the IJN 2nd Fleet, he was promoted to vice admiral and Commandant of the Imperial Japanese Naval Academy on 15 November 1939.

On 4 April 1941, he assumed command of the 2nd China Expeditionary Fleet, and was responsible for the naval component of the invasion of Hong Kong, where his duties primarily involved the blockade of Hong Kong harbor with small patrol craft and a couple of light cruisers. He nominally shared the position of Head of Japanese Occupation Forces in Hong Kong with General Takashi Sakai, but his authority was limited to offshore areas.

On 14 July 1942, he became Commander in Chief of the Maizuru Naval District. He retired from active service in March 1944.

Niimi died in 1993, aged 106. At his death, he was the last surviving vice admiral of the Imperial Navy.

Government offices
Preceded by Sir Mark Aitchison Young as Governor of Hong Kong	Governor-General of Hong Kong; 1941–1942; Served alongside: Takashi Sakai	Succeeded by Rensuke Isogai
