= 21st Division (Imperial Japanese Army) =

- Active: 4 April 1938 – August 1945
- Country: Empire of Japan
- Branch: Imperial Japanese Army
- Type: Infantry
- Garrison/HQ: Kanazawa, Japan; Hanoi, French Indochina
- Nickname: Attack Division
- Engagements: Second Sino-Japanese War; World War II

Commanders
- Notable commanders: Hisakazu Tanaka

The 21st Division (第21師団, Dai-nijūichi Shidan) was an infantry division in the Imperial Japanese Army. Its tsūshōgō code name was the Vanquishing Division (討兵団, Tou Heidan). The 21st Division was created on 4 April 1938 as a triangular division as part of the military buildup following the outbreak of the Second Sino-Japanese War, along with the resurrected 17th and 18th Divisions, and the new 22nd and 23rd Divisions. Its original headquarters was in a suburb of the city of Kanazawa, and its troops were recruited primarily from communities in Ishikawa and Toyama Prefectures.

== Action ==
Initially assigned to the Japanese Northern China Area Army, it was deployed to mainland China from 15 July 1938, serving as a garrison force in Xuzhou. In February 1939, it participated in fighting in Northern Jiangsu. Under the command of Lieutenant Commander Hisakazu Tanaka from 1940 to 1943 as part of the Japanese 12th Army, the division participated in counter-insurgency operations in Northern China as well as the Battle of South Shanxi in May 1941, and the subsequent Hundred Regiments Offensive.

From November 1941, the division was transferred to the control of the Southern Expeditionary Army Group and transferred to the Philippines, landing at Lingayen Gulf on 26 February 1942. After the completion of the Philippines Campaign, from December 1943, the division was sent to French Indochina under the control of the IJA 38th Army, Assigned to a garrison role in Hanoi, it remained in Indochina through the end of the Pacific War except for a brief period in late 1944 when it crossed back into China to participate in Operation Ichi-Go. The division played a critical role in the Japanese coup d'état in French Indochina of March 1945, which resulted in the proclamation of the Empire of Vietnam independent from French rule. It remained as a garrison force in Hanoi until the surrender of Japan in August 1945.

A number of its troops refused to return to Japan and defected to join the Viet Minh in their struggle for independence (First Indochina War) against the returning French colonial forces. But in 1954 they were ordered to return to Japan by the Vietnamese government.

== See also ==
- List of Japanese Infantry Divisions
