= Hisakazu Tanaka =

Imperial Japanese Army lieutenant general (1889–1947)

- 田中 久一
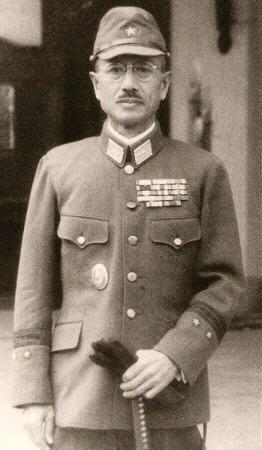

Governor of Hong Kong under Japanese occupation
- In office 1 February 1945 – 16 August 1945
- Monarch: Shōwa
- Prime Minister: Kuniaki Koiso; Kantarō Suzuki
- Preceded by: Rensuke Isogai
- Succeeded by: Sir Franklin Charles Gimson (Acting)

Personal details
- Born: Hisakazu Koganei; 16 March 1889 Himeji, Hyōgo, Japan
- Died: 27 March 1947 (aged 58) Canton, China
- Cause of death: Execution by shooting
- Education: Army War College

Military service
- Allegiance: Empire of Japan
- Branch/service: Imperial Japanese Army
- Years of service: 1910–1945
- Rank: Lieutenant general
- Commands: 21st Infantry Division; 23rd Army
- Battles/wars: Second Sino-Japanese War; World War II

Hisakazu Tanaka (田中 久一, Tanaka Hisakazu; 16 March 1889 – 27 March 1947) was a lieutenant general in the Imperial Japanese Army and governor of Japanese-occupied Hong Kong during World War II. His given name is occasionally transliterated "Hisaichi".

== Biography ==
=== Early career ===
Tanaka was born in Hyōgo Prefecture to the Koganei family, and was later adopted into the Tanaka family, whose surname he took. He graduated from the 22nd class of the Imperial Japanese Army Academy in 1910 and after serving as a junior officer with the IJA 37th Infantry Regiment, he attended the Army's Toyama School and subsequently graduated from the 30th class of the Army Staff College in 1918. He served in various bureaucratic staff positions within the Imperial Japanese Army General Staff from 1919 to 1920, and was sent as a military attaché to the United States from 1923 to 1924. After his return to Japan, he continued to serve in various staff positions, mostly as an instructor, except for a brief stint as commander of the 1st Guards Regiment from 1935 to 1937.

=== As general ===
Tanaka was promoted to major general at the end of 1937, and briefly assigned as Chief of Staff of the Taiwan Army in 1938. However, with the increase in military activity in China due to the Second Sino-Japanese War, Tanaka was quickly reassigned to become chief of staff of the newly-formed Japanese Twenty-First Army from 1938 to 1939. This army was under the control of the China Expeditionary Army would later be assigned the primary role in the Canton Operation (the invasion of Guangdong Province) in southern China; however, Tanaka returned to Japan in August 1939 to serve as Commandant of the Toyama Army Infantry School, before combat operations began.

In August 1940, he was promoted to lieutenant general and given command of the IJA 21st Division. As part of the Japanese 12th Army, the division participated in counter-insurgency operations in northern China as well as the Battle of South Shanxi in May 1941, and the subsequent Hundred Regiments Offensive. From November 1941, the division was transferred to the control of the Southern Expeditionary Army Group and transferred to the Philippines, landing at Lingayen Gulf in February 1942 for the Philippines Campaign. Tanaka was transferred to command the IJA Twenty-Third Army in China from March 1943. This was primarily a garrison force to deter the possible landings of Allied forces in southern China. It was involved in the Battle of Guilin-Liuzhou (part of Operation Ichi-Go) from August to November 1944 and surrendered to the Chinese Kuomintang forces on August 15, 1945 with the surrender of Japan.

Concurrently, from February 1945 to the end of the war, Tanaka was Governor-General of Hong Kong during the Japanese occupation.

At the end of the war, Tanaka was arrested by the American occupation authorities. He and several of his subordinates were tried before an American military tribunal held in Shanghai in 1946 for command responsibility in the extrajudicial execution of an American POW. Tanaka was found guilty and sentenced to death by hanging. However, he was then turned over to the Kuomintang Nanjing War Crimes Tribunal in connection with the actions of IJA 23rd Army in China. Tanaka had both permitted and, at times, ordered and encouraged his troops to commit atrocities, including the rape, torture, and massacres of Chinese POWs and civilians. Tanaka was found guilty and sentenced to death. He was publicly shot in Canton on 27 March 1947. Tanaka was buried in Guangzhou and his remains were repatriated back to Japan in 1972.

== Footnotes ==
Government offices
Preceded by Rensuke Isogai	Governor-General of Hong Kong; February 1945 – August 1945	Succeeded by Sir Franklin Charles Gimson as Governor of Hong Kong
