= Rensuke Isogai =

Japanese general and governor (1886–1967)

- 磯谷 廉介

Governor of Hong Kong under Japanese occupation
- In office 20 February 1942 – 24 December 1944
- Monarch: Shōwa
- Prime Minister: Hideki Tōjō; Kuniaki Koiso
- Preceded by: Takashi Sakai; Masaichi Niimi
- Succeeded by: Hisakazu Tanaka

Personal details
- Born: 3 September 1886 Sasayama, Hyōgo, Japan
- Died: 6 June 1967 (aged 80) Ichinomiya, Chiba, Japan
- Education: Army War College
- Awards: Order of the Rising Sun, 1st class Order of the Golden Kite, 2nd class

Military service
- Allegiance: Empire of Japan
- Branch/service: Imperial Japanese Army
- Years of service: 1904-1939; 1942-1944
- Rank: Lieutenant General
- Commands: 10th Infantry Division
- Battles/wars: Second Sino-Japanese War; World War II

Rensuke Isogai (磯谷 廉介, Isogai Rensuke; 3 September 1886 – 6 June 1967) was a general in the Imperial Japanese Army and Governor of Hong Kong under Japanese occupation from 20 February 1942 to 24 December 1944.

== Biography ==
=== Early career ===
A native of Hyōgo Prefecture, Isogai graduated from the 16th class of the Imperial Japanese Army Academy in 1904. Future generals Seishirō Itagaki and Kenji Doihara were among his classmates. He graduated from the 27th class of the Army War College (Japan) and was known for his fascination with all things Chinese.

In 1928, Isogai was attached to the IJA 3rd Division. He was given command of the IJA 7th Infantry Regiment from 1928 to 1930, and became Chief of Staff of the IJA 1st Division in 1930.

From 1931 to 1937, he held a number of staff positions within the Imperial Japanese Army General Staff; however, with the start of the Second Sino-Japanese War in 1937, Isogai volunteered to be a military attaché to China. The position was very short, as he was soon assigned to a combat command as the commander in chief of the IJA 10th Division in China, participating in the Tianjin–Pukou Railway Operation and the Battle of Taierzhuang.

In 1938, Isogai was transferred to Manchukuo as Chief of Staff of the Kwantung Army shortly before the disastrous Nomonhan Incident. He was recalled to Japan, and forced into retirement in 1939.

=== Hong Kong ===
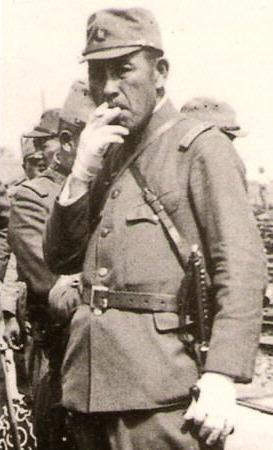
General Isogai as Governor of Hong Kong

With the start of the Pacific War, Isogai was recalled to active duty in 1942. He was appointed Governor-General of Japanese-occupied Hong Kong on 20 February 1942, at the recommendation of Prime Minister Hideki Tōjō, his former superior officer while serving with the Kwantung Army.

During Isogai's tenure, Hong Kong was subjected to martial law. He based his command post at the Peninsula Hotel in Kowloon. Although Isogai arrived after the worst excesses committed by Japanese troops against civilians during the conquest of Hong Kong, and Isogai's troops (for the most part) were more disciplined than most Japanese forces in mainland China, Hongkongers suffered much deprivation from food shortages. The creation and subsequent inflation of the Japanese Military Yen, a currency without reserves issued by the Japanese Imperial Army administration, caused severe disruption of the economy, impoverishing many Hong Kong residents. Public transportation and utilities unavoidably failed, due to shortage of fuel and American air raids killed thousands, leaving more homeless.

While Isogai was much hated by many older generations of Hong Kong people, Isogai is credited with introducing an important element of Hong Kong life during his tenure: Sunday horseracing. Sunday horseracing is now a very important part of Hong Kong culture, in which thousands participate. Also, Isogai was responsible for the addition of Japanese elements of architecture on the facade of the Hong Kong Government House.

Isogai retired from the post on 24 December 1944, and returned to Japan. At the end of the war, he was arrested by the SCAP authorities and extradited to Nanjing, China, where he faced a military tribunal for war crimes committed during the occupation of Hong Kong. He was sentenced to life imprisonment, but released in 1952, and allowed to return to Japan. He died in 1967.

== See also ==
- Japanese Occupation of Hong Kong

=== Books ===
- Coox, Alvin D. (1990). Nomonhan: Japan Against Russia, 1939. Stanford University Press. ISBN 0-8047-1835-0.
- Snow, Philip (2004). The Fall of Hong Kong: Britain, China, and the Japanese Occupation. Yale University Press. ISBN 0-300-10373-5.

Government offices
Preceded by Takashi Sakai and Masaichi Niimi	Governor-General of Hong Kong; 20 February 1942 – 24 December 1944	Succeeded by Hisakazu Tanaka
