= Takashi Sakai =

Japanese officer, war criminal 1887–1946

- 酒井 隆
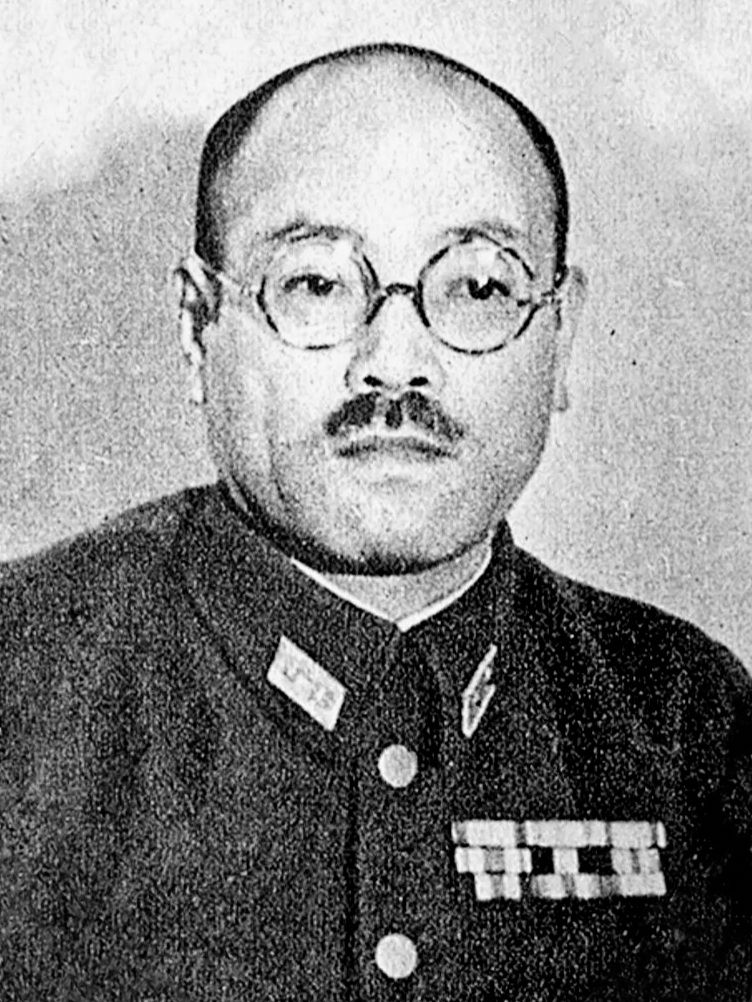

Governor of Hong Kong under Japanese occupation
- In office December 25, 1941 – February 20, 1942 Serving with Masaichi Niimi
- Monarch: Shōwa
- Prime Minister: Hideki Tōjō
- Preceded by: Sir Mark Aitchison Young
- Succeeded by: Rensuke Isogai

Personal details
- Born: October 18, 1887 Kamo District, Hiroshima Prefecture, Japan
- Died: September 30, 1946 (aged 58) Nanjing, Jiangsu, Republic of China
- Cause of death: Execution by firing squad
- Education: Army War College

Military service
- Allegiance: Empire of Japan
- Branch/service: Imperial Japanese Army
- Years of service: 1908-1943
- Rank: Lieutenant General
- Commands: IJA 26th Division, IJA 4th Army, Southern China Area Army, China Expeditionary Army, Central District Army, IJA Third Area Army
- Battles/wars: Second Sino-Japanese War; World War II

Takashi Sakai (酒井 隆, Sakai Takashi; 18 October 1887 – 30 September 1946) was a lieutenant general in the Imperial Japanese Army during World War II, known for his role as Governor of Hong Kong under Japanese occupation.

== Biography ==
Sakai was born in Kamo District, Hiroshima, now part of Hiroshima city. He was educated in military preparatory schools in Kobe and Osaka and graduated from the 20th class of the Imperial Japanese Army Academy in 1908, whereupon he was assigned to the IJA 28th Infantry Regiment. He graduated from the 28th class of the Army Staff College.

=== Career in China ===
In 1928, Sakai was stationed in Jinan, Shandong Province, China with the IJA 12th Infantry Regiment during the Jinan Incident and is believed by some Chinese historians to be responsible for the murder of Kuomintang army emissaries during negotiations on May 4, 1928. He was transferred to the Tianjin Garrison from 1929 to 1932. In 1932, Sakai was promoted to colonel and was assigned to the 5th Section military intelligence of the 2nd Bureau of the Imperial Japanese Army General Staff from 1932 to 1934.

As Chief of Staff of the Japanese China Garrison Army from 1934 to 1935, Sakai orchestrated a series of armed conflicts, which resulted in an armistice with the Chinese government which resulted in the He–Umezu Agreement which effectively gave Japan control of Hebei Province. He became commander of the IJA 23rd Infantry Regiment in 1936. Sakai was promoted to major general in 1937 and was appointed commander of the IJA 28th Infantry Brigade. He became a lieutenant general in 1939, and was assigned to the Coordination Bureau, Asia Development Group, Mengjiang Board from 1939 to 1940. He was also assigned to the Mongolia Garrison Army at this time.

Recalled to Japan in 1940, Sakai was briefly appointed commander of the Imperial Guards Depot Division.

=== World War II ===
Sakai was commander of the IJA 23rd Army stationed in Canton in November 1941. He was ordered to use the IJA 38th Division, which was normally under the Southern Expeditionary Army Group to capture Hong Kong, and was given a 10-day time limit.

On December 8, 1941, a few hours after the attack on Pearl Harbor, Japanese forces commanded by Sakai, and his Chief of Staff Tadamichi Kuribayashi, invaded Hong Kong. However, the subsequent Battle of Hong Kong did not proceed as quickly or as smoothly as Sakai had planned, and he was forced to request an extension to his deadline. Sir Mark Young, the Governor of Hong Kong, surrendered all British forces in Hong Kong on Christmas Day, after 18 days of fighting. Sakai's frustrations over the unexpectedly strong British resistance may have been reflected by the extreme brutality which characterized the campaign and subsequent occupation.

Sakai served as Japanese Governor of Hong Kong until February 20, 1942. He was recalled to Japan, and retired from active service in 1943. He was recalled to active service in February 1945, and was ordered to go to Beijing; however, the war came to an end before he departed Japan.

=== Execution ===
After the end of the war, Sakai was apprehended by the American occupation authorities at the request of the Chinese government and was extradited to China, where he was accused of war crimes, crimes against humanity, and crimes against peace. He was convicted at the Nanjing War Crimes Tribunal on August 27, 1946, of command responsibility for the extrajudicial murder of Chinese civilians and was executed by firing squad on September 30.
