= Hong Kong Defence Force (Imperial Japanese Army) =

- Active: 1942–45
- Country: Japan
- Branch: Imperial Japanese Army
- Size: 106 officers and 3,028 enlisted men
- Engagements: World War II

The Hong Kong Defence Force was the main Imperial Japanese Army formation responsible for garrison duties during the Japanese occupation of Hong Kong. It was formed in January 1942 and disbanded after the end of the war in August 1945.

== Structure and history ==
The Hong Kong Defence Force was established on 19 January 1942, following the Japanese victory during the Battle of Hong Kong in December 1941. The 38th Division, which had been the main Imperial Japanese Army unit responsible for capturing the British colony, departed the same month. The Hong Kong Defence Force reported to the Japanese Government of the Hong Kong Occupied Territory. The other Japanese military units stationed in Hong Kong from early 1942 were the small Hong Kong Artillery Force and the Imperial Japanese Navy's Hong Kong Base Force, which formed part of the 2nd China Expeditionary Fleet.

The Hong Kong Defence Force had a similar structure to the Imperial Japanese Army's Independent Mixed Brigades, which were also initially established to occupy Japanese-held territory. Its main elements were three infantry battalions, the 67th, 68th and 69th Independent Infantry Battalions. These battalions were supported by an artillery unit which comprised six anti-aircraft guns, a trench mortar battery and two field artillery batteries. The Hong Kong Defence Force also had a hospital. The authorised strength was 106 officers and 3,028 enlisted men. This structure remained unchanged until the force's disbandment following the end of the war.

The three infantry battalions were stationed at Hong Kong Island, Kowloon and the New Territories. The battalions in Kowloon and the New Territories operated in urban areas, along the Kowloon-Canton Railway and at four posts. The size of the Hong Kong Defence Force proved too small, and a detachment of 250 soldiers from the Twenty-Third Army was also stationed in Hong Kong.

During the later stages of the war, the Japanese forces in Hong Kong constructed many fortifications along the territory. Some were concrete pillboxes that were built at key junctions and strategic points within population centres, whilst in the countryside, many tunnels were dug into the hillside to act as defensive positions. The Japanese decided that the area around Fei Ngo Shan and Tate’s Cairn was a key strategic location to defend, so they built dozens of tunnels in the location.

The Hong Kong Defence Force surrendered to the British along with the rest of the Japanese forces in Hong Kong on 16 September 1945 as part of the reoccupation of the colony.
