= General Beckwith =

General Beckwith may refer to:

- George Beckwith (British Army officer) (1753–1823), British Army general
- John Charles Beckwith (British Army officer) (1789–1862), British Army major general
- Thomas Sydney Beckwith (1770–1831), British Army lieutenant general
- William Beckwith (1795–1871), British Army general

== See also ==
- Merton Beckwith-Smith (1890–1942), British Army major general
