= List of British Army awards in the Napoleonic Wars =

This is a list of British Army officers who received sovereign's awards for their services during the Napoleonic Wars, comprising the period 1803 to 1815 and ranging in awards from knights bachelor to peerages. This list includes officers of the Royal Marines who were at the time seconded to the British Army, and foreign officers serving in the British Army who received honorary awards.

== Introduction ==
Initially during the Napoleonic Wars, awards were rare for those who had distinguished themselves in service, leaving many without tangible symbols of their success. These awards were overwhelmingly presented to senior officers rather than to other ranks and subalterns, for whom the prevailing opinion was that doing their duty was a reward of itself. Decorations for other ranks were only introduced in 1854 with the Distinguished Conduct Medal.

The lack of official awards caused great resentment among the British, as in comparison the French liberally awarded the Legion of Honour. Some regiments created their own awards to fill this gap, such as embroidered colours for personal deeds and badges for the survivors of forlorn hopes. In 1815 the Order of the Bath was reorganised to combat this lack of appropriate rewards, adding several new classes to it and allowing more officers, including those of field rank, to receive rewards for their services. Over 500 soldiers would go on to receive awards as part of this expanded system. The highest honour, a peerage, was awarded sixteen times to twelve individuals, of which Arthur Wellesley, 1st Duke of Wellington, received four increasing from a viscountcy to a dukedom.

Not covered in this list are campaign medals awarded during the Napoleonic Wars, which often did include the lower ranks in awards. These included the Waterloo Medal and later the Military General Service Medal, as well as officer-specific medals such as the Army Gold Cross and Army Gold Medal. Also not covered is the Royal Guelphic Order which, while presented to British Army officers by the Prince Regent, was a Hanoverian order rather than a British one.

Table key
Posthumous award
Royal Marines officer
Honorary award

== Peerages ==
A peerage was traditionally the most prestigious award an officer might receive, providing them with a hereditary title of nobility. British Army officers received peerages for both outstanding military and political services in this period; those who already held a peerage would be elevated in it. The most peerages were awarded in 1814 to general officers who had served in the Peninsular War as commanders of independent units or formations larger than a division.

Rank	Name	Peerage	Date	Ref.
General	Gerard Lake, 1st Baron Lake	Viscount Lake	31 October 1807	
Lieutenant-General	William Cathcart, 10th Baron Cathcart	Viscount Cathcart	3 November 1807	
Lieutenant-General	Sir Arthur Wellesley	Viscount Wellington	4 September 1809	
General	Arthur Wellesley, 1st Viscount Wellington	Earl of Wellington	28 February 1812	
General	Arthur Wellesley, 1st Earl of Wellington	Marquess of Wellington	18 August 1812	
General	Henry Phipps, 1st Baron Mulgrave	Earl of Mulgrave	7 September 1812	
Field Marshal	Arthur Wellesley, 1st Marquess of Wellington	Duke of Wellington	3 May 1814	
Lieutenant-General	Sir John Hope	Baron Niddry	3 May 1814	
Lieutenant-General	Sir Thomas Graham	Baron Lynedoch	3 May 1814	
Lieutenant-General	Sir Stapleton Cotton	Baron Combermere	3 May 1814	
Lieutenant-General	Sir Rowland Hill	Baron Hill	3 May 1814	
Lieutenant-General	Sir William Beresford	Baron Beresford	3 May 1814	
Lieutenant-General	Sir Charles Stewart	Baron Stewart	1 July 1814	
General	William Cathcart, 1st Viscount Cathcart	Earl Cathcart	16 July 1814	
Lieutenant-General	Henry Paget, 2nd Earl of Uxbridge	Marquess of Anglesey	23 June 1815	
General	George Harris	Baron Harris	11 August 1815	

== Baronetcies ==
A baronetcy is a hereditary knighthood; it is not a title of nobility and as such officers awarded baronetcies remained commoners. In precedence these titles ranked immediately below baronies, the lowest rank of the peerage. Many more officers who had served in the Napoleonic Wars were created baronets later in their careers, years after the wars had ended.

Rank	Name	Date	Reason	Ref.
Major-General	John Doyle	29 October 1805	For services	
Major-General	Sir Charles Green	5 December 1805	For services and capture of Suriname	
Major-General	George Prevost	6 December 1805	Defence of Dominica	
Lieutenant-General	Charles Hastings	25 February 1806		
Lieutenant-General	George Nugent	11 November 1806	For services	
Lieutenant-General	Harry Burrard	3 November 1807	For services Copenhagen Expedition	
Major-General	Thomas Blomefield	14 November 1807	For services Copenhagen Expedition and Royal Artillery	
	George Pigott	3 October 1808		
Lieutenant-General	Sir David Baird	13 April 1809	For services India, Egypt, Cape Colony, Peninsula	
Lieutenant-General	William Payne	8 December 1812	Commander of Cavalry in Peninsula	
Lieutenant-Colonel	Sir Richard Fletcher	14 December 1812	Commander of Royal Engineers in Peninsula	
Major-General	Roger Sheaffe	16 January 1813	Commander Upper Canada	
Lieutenant-General	Hildebrand Oakes	2 November 1813	For services	
Lieutenant-General	Thomas Hislop	2 November 1813	For services	
General	George Hewett	6 November 1813	For services and Commander-in-Chief, India	
Major-General	Sir John Hamilton	21 December 1814	Division commander in Peninsula	
Lieutenant-Colonel	Howard Elphinstone	3 April 1815	Commander of Royal Engineers in Peninsula	
General	Sir Hew Dalrymple	6 May 1815	For services in Peninsula and Gibraltar	
Lieutenant-General	Sir Alexander Campbell	6 May 1815	Division commander in Peninsula	

== Order of the Bath ==
The Order of the Bath was an order of chivalry available to British Army officers. Prior to 1815 the order only had one grade, Knight of the Bath, which was presented in the post-nominals KB, and was awarded not for meritorious achievement but for men of high social and economic status. This antiquated order was expanded into military and civil divisions with three classes, so that more people could be included in the order and rewarded for their services. Those officers who already held a KB received the highest class of the new order, becoming a Knight Grand Cross of the Order of the Bath. This class and the next, Knight Commander, styled the awardee as a knight, while the lowest class, Knight Companion, did not.

Awards for the new Order of the Bath took into account both distinguished service and bravery, and were less constrained to ranks as previous awards had been. The first class was limited to those officers of major-general or above, with soldiers as low as lieutenant-colonel being made Knights Commander. Colonels were more likely to be made Knights Companion, which award became the standard for service in the field. Membership of the first two classes of the order was limited, with seventy-two men being allowed the first, and 180 the second. Ten extra spaces were added to the second class for the addition of foreign officers who nonetheless held British commissions, notably those of the King's German Legion.

Awards of the Order of the Bath had not been finalised when the Hundred Days campaign was fought, and so officers who had distinguished themselves at the battles of Quatre Bras and Waterloo were also included when the lists were eventually released. Those officers rewarded for their services in earlier campaigns, such as the Peninsular War, had their awards dated 2 January, while those for the latter campaign were dated 22 June.

=== Knight Grand Cross ===
Rank	Name	Date	Prior KB	Ref.
Field Marshal	Prince Frederick, Duke of York and Albany	2 January 1815	30 December 1767	
General	Sir Robert Abercromby	2 January 1815	15 January 1797	
General	Sir Alured Clarke	2 January 1815	14 January 1797	
General	John Hely-Hutchinson, 1st Baron Hutchinson	2 January 1815	28 May 1801	
General	Sir Eyre Coote	2 January 1815	19 May 1802	
General	Sir John Cradock	2 January 1815	16 February 1803	
General	Sir David Dundas	2 January 1815	28 April 1803	
Field Marshal	Arthur Wellesley, 1st Duke of Wellington	2 January 1815	28 August 1804	
General	George Ludlow, 3rd Earl Ludlow	2 January 1815	26 September 1804	
Lieutenant-General	Sir John Stuart	2 January 1815	13 September 1806	
General	Sir David Baird	2 January 1815	21 April 1809	
Lieutenant-General	John Hope, 1st Baron Niddry	2 January 1815	21 April 1809	
Lieutenant-General	Sir Brent Spencer	2 January 1815	21 April 1809	
General	Sir George Beckwith	2 January 1815	24 April 1809	
Lieutenant-General	Sir John Sherbrooke	2 January 1815	16 September 1809	
Lieutenant-General	William Beresford, 1st Baron Beresford	2 January 1815	16 October 1810	
Lieutenant-General	Thomas Graham, 1st Baron Lynedoch	2 January 1815	22 February 1812	
Lieutenant-General	Rowland Hill, 1st Baron Hill	2 January 1815	22 February 1812	
Lieutenant-General	Sir Samuel Auchmuty	2 January 1815	22 February 1812	
Lieutenant-General	Sir Edward Paget	2 January 1815	12 June 1812	
Lieutenant-General	Stapleton Cotton, 1st Baron Combermere	2 January 1815	21 August 1812	
General	Sir George Nugent	2 January 1815	1 February 1813	
General	Sir William Keppel	2 January 1815	1 February 1813	
Lieutenant-General	Sir John Doyle	2 January 1815	1 February 1813	
Lieutenant-General	Lord William Bentinck	2 January 1815	1 February 1813	
Lieutenant-General	Sir James Leith	2 January 1815	1 February 1813	
Lieutenant-General	Sir Thomas Picton	2 January 1815	1 February 1813	
Lieutenant-General	Sir Galbraith Lowry Cole	2 January 1815	1 February 1813	
Lieutenant-General	Charles Stewart, 1st Baron Stewart	2 January 1815	1 February 1813	
Lieutenant-General	Sir Alexander Hope	2 January 1815	29 June 1813	
Lieutenant-General	Sir Henry Clinton	2 January 1815	29 June 1813	
Lieutenant-General	George Ramsay, 9th Earl of Dalhousie	2 January 1815	11 September 1813	
Lieutenant-General	Sir William Stewart	2 January 1815	11 September 1813	
Major-General	Sir George Murray	2 January 1815	11 September 1813	
Major-General	Sir Edward Pakenham	2 January 1815	11 September 1813	
General	William, Prince of Orange	2 January 1815	14 August 1814	
Field Marshal	Prince Edward, Duke of Kent and Strathearn	2 January 1815	—N/a	
Field Marshal	Prince Ernest, Duke of Cumberland and Teviotdale	2 January 1815	—N/a	
Field Marshal	Prince Adolphus, Duke of Cambridge	2 January 1815	—N/a	
Field Marshal	Prince William Frederick, Duke of Gloucester and Edinburgh	2 January 1815	—N/a	
Lieutenant-General	Henry Paget, 2nd Earl of Uxbridge	2 January 1815	—N/a	
General	Robert Brownrigg	2 January 1815	—N/a	
Lieutenant-General	Harry Calvert	2 January 1815	—N/a	
Lieutenant-General	Thomas Maitland	2 January 1815	—N/a	
Lieutenant-General	William Henry Clinton	2 January 1815	—N/a	
Lieutenant-General	Sir John Abercromby	7 April 1815	—N/a	
Major-General	Sir Charles Colville	7 April 1815	—N/a	
Major-General	Sir James Kempt	22 June 1815	—N/a	

=== Knight Commander ===
Rank	Name	Date	Ref.
Lieutenant-General	Gordon Drummond	2 January 1815	
Lieutenant-General	John Abercromby	2 January 1815	
Lieutenant-General	Ronald Craufurd Ferguson	2 January 1815	
Lieutenant-General	Henry Warde	2 January 1815	
Lieutenant-General	William Houston	2 January 1815	
Lieutenant-General	William Lumley	2 January 1815	
Lieutenant-General	Wroth Palmer Acland	2 January 1815	
Lieutenant-General	Miles Nightingall	2 January 1815	
Lieutenant-General	Henry Frederick Campbell	2 January 1815	
Major-General	Alan Cameron	2 January 1815	
Major-General	Charles Colville	2 January 1815	
Major-General	Henry Fane	2 January 1815	
Major-General	George Anson	2 January 1815	
Major-General	Kenneth Howard	2 January 1815	
Major-General	Henry Bell	2 January 1815	
Major-General	John Oswald	2 January 1815	
Major-General	William Anson	2 January 1815	
Major-General	Edward Howorth	2 January 1815	
Major-General	Charles Wale	2 January 1815	
Major-General	Ormsby Vandeleur	2 January 1815	
Major-General	Edward Stopford	2 January 1815	
Major-General	George Walker	2 January 1815	
Major-General	James Kempt	2 January 1815	
Major-General	Robert Rollo Gillespie	2 January 1815	
Major-General	William Henry Pringle	2 January 1815	
Major-General	Frederick Robinson	2 January 1815	
Major-General	Edward Barnes	2 January 1815	
Major-General	William Ponsonby	2 January 1815	
Major-General	John Byng	2 January 1815	
Major-General	Thomas Brisbane	2 January 1815	
Major-General	Denis Pack	2 January 1815	
Major-General	Lord Edward Somerset	2 January 1815	
Major-General	Thomas Bradford	2 January 1815	
Major-General	John Lambert	2 January 1815	
Major-General	James Gordon	2 January 1815	
Major-General	Manley Power	2 January 1815	
Major-General	Samuel Gibbs	2 January 1815	
Major-General	Matthew Whitworth-Aylmer, 5th Baron Aylmer	2 January 1815	
Major-General	Colquhoun Grant	2 January 1815	
Major-General	Thomas Sydney Beckwith	2 January 1815	
Major-General	Robert O'Callaghan	2 January 1815	
Major-General	John Keane	2 January 1815	
Major-General	Colin Halkett	2 January 1815	
Major-General	Henry Bunbury	2 January 1815	
Major-General	Hussey Vivian	2 January 1815	
Major-General	Henry Torrens	2 January 1815	
Colonel	John Elley	2 January 1815	
Colonel	Charles Belson	2 January 1815	
Colonel	William Howe De Lancey	2 January 1815	
Colonel	Benjamin D'Urban	2 January 1815	
Colonel	George Bingham	2 January 1815	
Colonel	Charles Greville	2 January 1815	
Colonel	Hoylet Framingham	2 January 1815	
Colonel	Andrew Barnard	2 January 1815	
Colonel	William Robe	2 January 1815	
Colonel	Henry Ellis	2 January 1815	
Colonel	John Cameron	2 January 1815	
Colonel	Robert Trench	2 January 1815	
Colonel	Charles Pratt	2 January 1815	
Colonel	Edward Blakeney	2 January 1815	
Colonel	John McLean	2 January 1815	
Colonel	Richard Jackson	2 January 1815	
Colonel	William Douglas	2 January 1815	
Colonel	Colin Campbell	2 January 1815	
Colonel	John Colborne	2 January 1815	
Colonel	Sir Archibald Campbell	2 January 1815	
Colonel	Thomas Arbuthnot	2 January 1815	
Colonel	Henry Bouverie	2 January 1815	
Lieutenant-Colonel	William Williams	2 January 1815	
Lieutenant-Colonel	Henry Hollis Bradford	2 January 1815	
Lieutenant-Colonel	Alexander Leith	2 January 1815	
Lieutenant-Colonel	Robert Lawrence Dundas	2 January 1815	
Lieutenant-Colonel	Robert Arbuthnot	2 January 1815	
Lieutenant-Colonel	Sir Charles Sutton	2 January 1815	
Lieutenant-Colonel	James Douglas	2 January 1815	
Lieutenant-Colonel	Henry Hardinge	2 January 1815	
Lieutenant-Colonel	George Berkeley	2 January 1815	
Lieutenant-Colonel	Jeremiah Dickson	2 January 1815	
Lieutenant-Colonel	Sir John Milley Doyle	2 January 1815	
Lieutenant-Colonel	Sir Thomas Noel Hill	2 January 1815	
Lieutenant-Colonel	Robert Macara	2 January 1815	
Lieutenant-Colonel	Alexander Gordon	2 January 1815	
Lieutenant-Colonel	Henry Carr	2 January 1815	
Lieutenant-Colonel	Charles Broke	2 January 1815	
Lieutenant-Colonel	Lord FitzRoy Somerset	2 January 1815	
Lieutenant-Colonel	James Wilson	2 January 1815	
Lieutenant-Colonel	Alexander Dickson	2 January 1815	
Lieutenant-Colonel	John May	2 January 1815	
Lieutenant-Colonel	George Scovell	2 January 1815	
Lieutenant-Colonel	William Gomm	2 January 1815	
Lieutenant-Colonel	Ulysses Burgh	2 January 1815	
Lieutenant-Colonel	Francis D'Oyly	2 January 1815	
Lieutenant-Colonel	Richard Williams	2 January 1815	
Lieutenant-Colonel	James Malcolm	2 January 1815	
Lieutenant-Colonel	James Archibald Hope	2 January 1815	
Lieutenant-Colonel	Augustus Frazer	2 January 1815	
Lieutenant-Colonel	Hew Dalrymple Ross	2 January 1815	
Lieutenant-Colonel	Edmund Kenyton Williams	2 January 1815	
Lieutenant-Colonel	Maxwell Grant	2 January 1815	
Lieutenant-Colonel	Frederick Stovin	2 January 1815	
Lieutenant-Colonel	Joseph Carncross	2 January 1815	
Lieutenant-Colonel	Robert Gardiner	2 January 1815	
Lieutenant-Colonel	John Dyer	2 January 1815	
Lieutenant-General	Charles, Baron Linsingen	2 January 1815	
Major-General	Sigismund, Baron Low	2 January 1815	
Major-General	Henry de Hinuber	2 January 1815	
Major-General	William de Dornberg	2 January 1815	
Colonel	Frederick de Arentsschildt	2 January 1815	
Colonel	Julius Hartmann	2 January 1815	
Lieutenant-General	Moore Disney	7 April 1815	
Major-General	William Inglis	7 April 1815	
Major-General	James Lyon	7 April 1815	
Major-General	George Cooke	20 June 1815	
Major-General	Peregrine Maitland	22 June 1815	
Major-General	Frederick Adam	22 June 1815	

=== Companion ===
Three hundred and twenty men were created Companions of the Order of the Bath between 4 June and 8 December 1815. Seventy-three of these were colonels, with 215 lieutenant-colonels receiving awards alongside 32 majors. Three of the majors were Royal Marines.

== Knights bachelor ==
Knight bachelor was the lowest rank of knighthood available, not being hereditary or part of any order. Most commonly, British Army officers who were made knights bachelor had already received foreign knighthoods for their services, such as the Portuguese Military Order of the Tower and Sword, which by itself would not allow awardees to style themselves as knights. Officers were also made knights bachelor if they stood as proxy in the installation ceremony for another officer's knighthood, most commonly for the Order of the Bath.

Rank	Name	Date	Reason	Ref.
Lieutenant-Colonel	George Smith	9 December 1807	Aide de camp to George III	
Lieutenant-Colonel	Charles Imhoff	1807	Unknown	
Brigadier-General	Charles Shipley	11 March 1808	Royal Engineers	
Captain	Mark Gerard	30 March 1809	Royal Marines	
Captain	William Wynn	2 March 1810	Governor of Sandown Fort	
Lieutenant-Colonel	Richard Fletcher	18 April 1812	Royal Engineers	
Lieutenant-Colonel	George Adam Wood	22 May 1812	Proxy for Sir John Sherbrooke	
Major	John Tylden	22 May 1812	Proxy for Sir Samuel Auchmuty	
Captain	Charles Gordon	29 May 1812	Proxy for Sir John Hope	
Colonel	Thomas Sydney Beckwith	29 May 1812	Proxy for Sir George Beckwith	
Lieutenant-Colonel	Robert Chambre Hill	29 May 1812	Proxy for Sir Rowland Hill	
Lieutenant-General	Alexander Campbell	29 May 1812	Proxy for Arthur Wellesley, 1st Earl of Wellington	
Lieutenant-General	John Hamilton	15 July 1813	Award of Portuguese Military Order of the Tower and Sword	
Colonel	George Elder	11 November 1813	Award of Portuguese Military Order of the Tower and Sword	
Brigadier-General	John Wilson	16 April 1814	Award of Portuguese Military Order of the Tower and Sword	
Lieutenant-Colonel	John Browne	16 April 1814	Award of Portuguese Military Order of the Tower and Sword	
Colonel	Hudson Lowe	26 April 1814	Royal Corsican Rangers	
Lieutenant-Colonel	Archibald Campbell	7 May 1814	Award of Portuguese Military Order of the Tower and Sword	
Lieutenant-General	Albert Gledstanes	May 1814	Unknown	
Captain	Freeman Barton	25 June 1814	2nd Regiment of Foot	
Colonel	Charles Sutton	13 July 1814	Portuguese Army service	
Lieutenant-General	Tomkyns Hilgrove Turner	28 July 1814	Lieutenant Governor of Jersey	
Lieutenant-Colonel	Gregory Way	28 July 1814	Award of Portuguese Military Order of the Tower and Sword	
Lieutenant-Colonel	Thomas Noel Hill	28 July 1814	Award of Portuguese Military Order of the Tower and Sword	
Lieutenant-Colonel	John Milley Doyle	28 July 1814	Award of Portuguese Military Order of the Tower and Sword	
Colonel	Neil Campbell	7 October 1814	54th Regiment of Foot	
Lieutenant-Colonel	Charles Felix Smith	10 November 1814	Award of Spanish Order of Charles III	
Colonel	Edward Kerrison	5 January 1815	7th Light Dragoons	
Major-General	Loftus William Otway	15 January 1815	Unknown	
Lieutenant-Colonel	Henry Pynn	23 February 1815	Award of Portuguese Military Order of the Tower and Sword	
Lieutenant-Colonel	John Campbell	9 March 1815	Award of Portuguese Military Order of the Tower and Sword	
Colonel	Sir Charles Greville	20 April 1815	38th Regiment of Foot	
Lieutenant-Colonel	Victor von Arentsschildt	20 April 1815	Award of Portuguese Military Order of the Tower and Sword	
Colonel	Samuel Ford Whittingham	3 May 1815	Aide de camp to the Prince Regent	
Lieutenant-Colonel	Sir Richard Williams	25 May 1815	Royal Marines	
Lieutenant-Colonel	Sir James Malcolm	25 May 1815	Royal Marines	
Lieutenant-Colonel	Sir James Archibald Hope	25 May 1815	Unknown	
Lieutenant-Colonel	Sir Hew Dalrymple Ross	25 May 1815	Royal Artillery	
Lieutenant-Colonel	William Osborne Hamilton	25 May 1815	Meritorious Service on Heligoland	
Major-General	Matthew Whitworth-Aylmer, 5th Baron Aylmer	6 June 1815	Unknown	
Colonel	Sir Charles Pratt	29 June 1815	5th Regiment of Foot	
Major-General	Warren Peacocke	27 July 1815	Award of Portuguese Military Order of the Tower and Sword	
Lieutenant-Colonel	Thomas Reade	27 November 1815	Deputy Adjutant General Saint Helena	
Colonel	Hugh Gough	4 December 1815	Meritorious Service	
Lieutenant-Colonel	Sir William Williams	4 December 1815	Unknown	
Lieutenant-Colonel	Sir Robert Arbuthnot	4 December 1815	Unknown	
Major-General	Benjamin Bloomfield	11 December 1815	Chief Equerry to the Prince Regent	
Colonel	Charles William Doyle	1815	Unknown	
Colonel	Sir Robert Trench	22 December 1815	74th Regiment of Foot	
Lieutenant-Colonel	Sir Joseph Carncross	22 December 1815	Royal Artillery	
