= Governor Beckwith =

Governor Beckwith may refer to:

- George Beckwith (British Army officer) (1753–1823), Governor of Bermuda from 1798 to 1803, Governor of Saint Vincent from 1806 to 1808, and Governor of Barbados from 1810 to 1815
- Thomas Sydney Beckwith (1770–1831), Governor of Bombay from 1830 to 1831
