= British Army during the French Revolutionary and Napoleonic Wars =

British Army
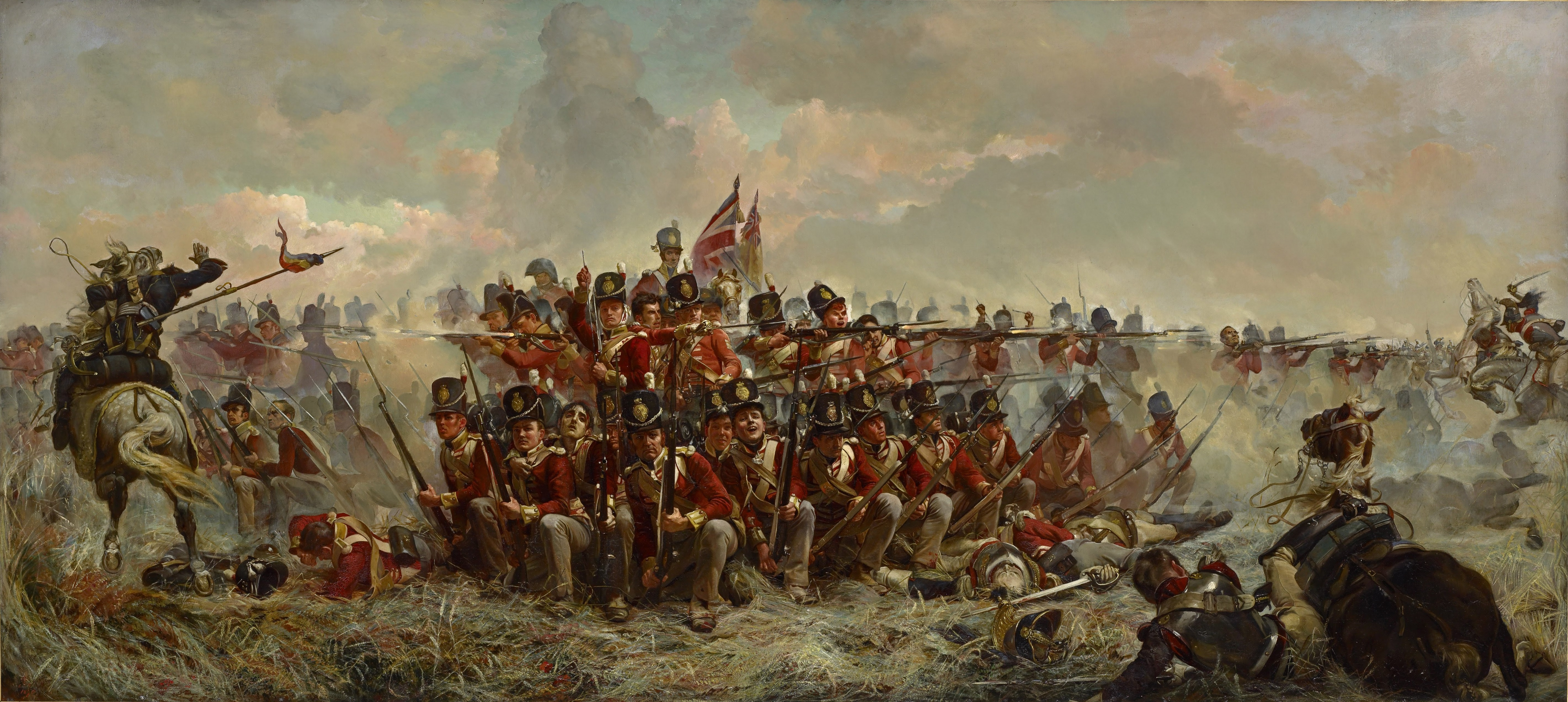
- 28th Regiment at Quatre Bras
- Active: 1793–1815
- Country: Great Britain (1793–1800); United Kingdom (1801–1815)
- Type: Army
- Role: Land warfare
- Size: 793,110 (total recruited, 1793–1815)
- Engagements: See list: French Revolutionary Wars; West Indies Campaign; Haitian Revolution; War of the First Coalition; Low Countries theatre; Invasion of Corsica; Invasion of the Cape Colony; Invasion of Ceylon; Irish Rebellion of 1798; War of the Second Coalition; Campaign in Egypt and Syria; Anglo-Russian invasion of Holland; Napoleonic Wars; Caribbean campaign of 1803–1810; War of the Third Coalition; Hanover Expedition; Invasion of Naples; Sicily, Mediterranean, South Africa; Anglo-Turkish War (1807–1809); Alexandria expedition; Gunboat War; Copenhagen expedition; Peninsular War; War of the Fifth Coalition; Walcheren Campaign; Mauritius campaign of 1809–1811; Invasion of the Spice Islands; Invasion of Java (1811); War of the Sixth Coalition; Campaign in south-west France; Holland; War of the Seventh Coalition; Waterloo campaign; Anglo-Mysore wars; Anglo-Spanish War (1796–1808); British invasions of the River Plate; Second Anglo-Maratha War; War of 1812

Commanders
- Commander-in-Chief: Lord Amherst (1793–1795); The Duke of York (1795–1809), (1811–1815); Sir David Dundas (1809–1811)
- Secretary of State for War 1794–1801 Secretary of State for War and the Colonies 1801–1854: Henry Dundas; Robert Hobart; John Pratt; Robert Stewart; William Windham; Robert Jenkinson
- Notable commanders: See list: Charles O'Hara; Sir Ralph Abercromby; Gerard Lake, 1st Viscount Lake; Prince Frederick, Duke of York and Albany; Sir John Stuart; Alexander Mackenzie Fraser; Lord Cathcart; Sir John Moore; Henry Paget, 1st Marquess of Anglesey; Arthur Wellesley, 1st Duke of Wellington; John Pitt, 2nd Earl of Chatham; Rowland Hill, 1st Viscount Hill; Thomas Graham, 1st Baron Lynedoch; William Beresford, 1st Viscount Beresford; Sir John Murray; Sir Frederick Adam

The British Army during the French Revolutionary and Napoleonic Wars experienced a time of rapid change. At the beginning of the French Revolutionary Wars in 1793, the army was a small, awkwardly administered force of barely 40,000 men. By the end of the Napoleonic Wars, the numbers had vastly increased. At its peak, in 1813, the regular army contained over 250,000 men.

The British infantry was "the only military force not to suffer a major reverse at the hands of Napoleonic France." Unlike most French cavalry troopers who after 1805 received a bare 2 to 3 weeks of training, being prosperous if they were taught basic horsemanship and drill, the British trooper received a minimum of 6 months' training. Because the French could not withdraw from continental conflict as easily as the British (due to the latter's geographic location) and were forced to wage one war after another, they often did not have time to properly train their recruits. The British Army during the Napoleonic Wars, along with the Grande Armée, was considered one of the most modernized of its time and was among the finest in military history, thanks to a large number of volunteers (who were more effective than recruits), good training, strong weaponry (such as the Baker rifle or the Congreve rocket), many skilled commanders, and appropriate tactics. (Note: § External links) The army did not fight a major clash directly with the Grande Armée formation, which was resolutely involved only in the wars of the Third, Fourth, Sixth coalitions and in the invasion of Russia.

Despite all the advantages, the quality of this army sacrificed its quantity: the army was not large enough to stand against France alone, even at the peak. It preferred to operate en masse only on secondary fronts such as the Netherlands (i.e., the 1799 invasion and Walcheren) and the Iberian Peninsula (the Peninsular War). During the Flanders campaign, the Netherlands front was the main one, however; both Prussia and Austria assisted Britain. At the Battle of Waterloo, there were 26 infantry brigades with only 9 were British. The Battle of Trafalgar demonstrated to the highest degree the Royal Navy's technological superiority over the Spanish and French navies, cementing its naval dominance a century ahead; hence, in the Peninsular War in which the British Army of that period had the strongest impact, the Royal Navy also played a major role in the victory, providing an advantage over the French Imperial Army in logistics and strategic planning for conducting operations by the army; under threat of landing on the coast, the French Army allocated the necessary forces to patrol it. On Iberia, the British Army was aided by guerrilla warfare as well, exacerbating French supply shipment and requiring French patrols to protect convoys. All these advantages also had an impact on military combat operations. (Note: § External links)

== Command, control and organization ==
=== High Command ===
Throughout the conflict with Napoleon, the British military high command remained largely what it had been under Queen Anne. The only major innovation was introduced by William Pitt the Younger in 1794, when he created a fully-fledged ministry with responsibility for military affairs. However, the Secretary of War was also Home Secretary, Treasurer of the Royal Navy and President of the Indian Board of Control. Thus the Secretary of State for War remained the supreme head of the military administration. His department, the War Office, controlled troop movements, facilities and pay rates, while he was accountable to Parliament for the costs of the army and had to settle disputes arising from the clash of civilian and military interests (e.g. billeting). Irrespective of this, the Royal Artillery and Royal Engineers continued to be under the command of the Master-General of the Ordnance. The Master-General was himself a military officer, but sat as a civilian minister in Parliament, where he was responsible for the Ordnance Department. His area of responsibility was in turn divided into a civilian part, which supplied both the army and the navy with supplies and ammunition, and a military part, that of the artillery and the Engineers, which he commanded as a soldier.

=== Infantry ===
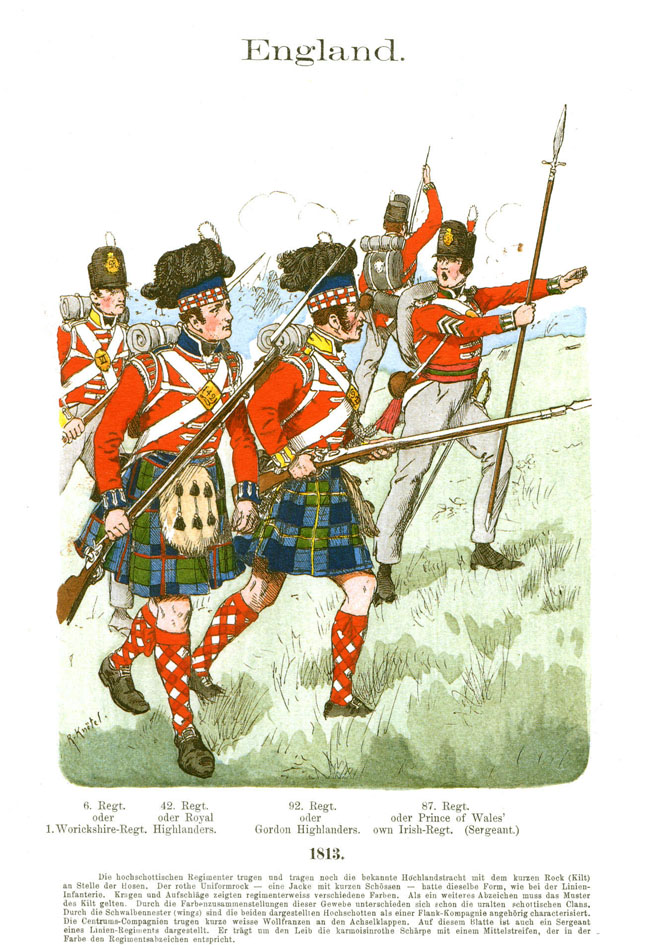
Soldiers from four different infantry regiments in 1813

By 1792, the infantry of the British army had grown to 135 regiments. In addition, numerous French émigrés and foreign regiments were serving in Britain, so that the militia and volunteer forces were also increased accordingly. The regular militia forces were recruited by ballot, and each county had to provide its own contingent. The militia entered active service when they formed into fixed units and were called up for active service, although they could even be combined into regular line regiments. The local militias (as opposed to the regular militias) functioned as reserve forces with scattered and irregularly distributed units that could be called up in times of national emergency. The volunteer units were privately raised units, usually supported by a wealthy patron or organization. They grew into a large force — in 1806 they comprised almost 329,000 people.
During the course of the wars against Napoleon, the British armed forces were expanded by subsequent Acts of Parliament, often by raising additional battalions for existing regiments, so that the effective strength of the infantry increased threefold between 1793 and 1801. By 1803, the strength of the entire British infantry totalled 126,677 men. Although the names of the colonels still took precedence in official usage until 1803, from 1792 all numbered infantry regiments were named after counties. Each regiment commanded by a colonel could have two or more battalions. However, as two battalions of the same regiment were rarely deployed together, the most important tactical formation was the battalion. It was commanded by a lieutenant-colonel and consisted of ten companies, each of which was commanded by a captain.

==== Riflemen and light infantry ====
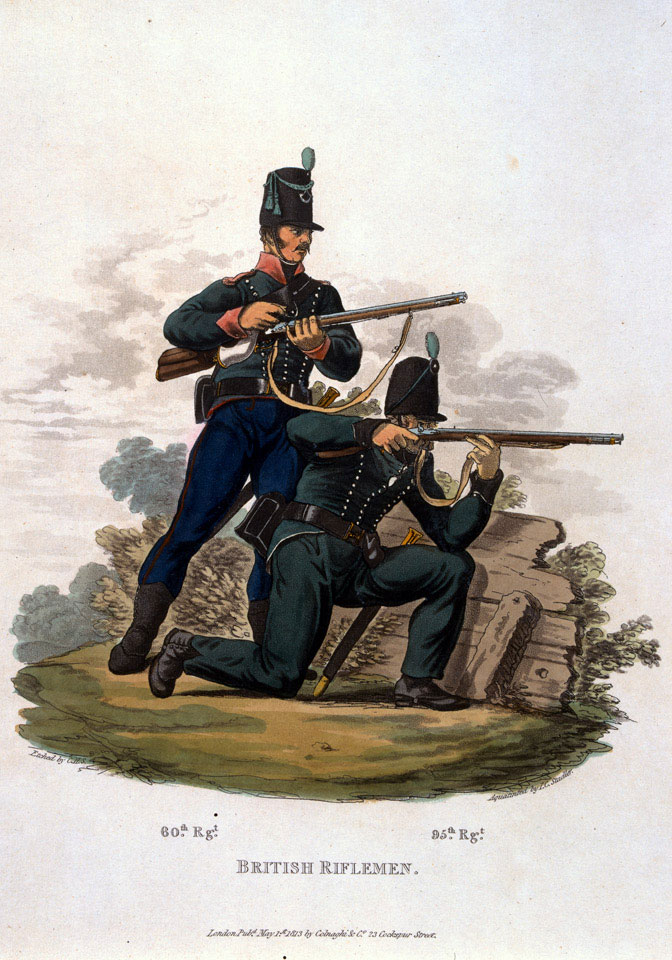
Soldiers of the 60th Foot (left) and 95th Rifles (right) in 1812

A number of infantry regiments were newly formed as, or converted into, dedicated regular light infantry regiments. During the early war against the French, the British Army was bolstered by light infantry mercenaries from Germany and the Low Countries, but the British light infantry companies proved inadequate against the experienced and far more numerous French during the Flanders campaign, and in the 1799 Anglo-Russian invasion of Holland, and light infantry development became urgent. The first rifle-armed unit, the 5th Battalion of the 60th Regiment, was formed mainly from German émigrés before 1795. An Experimental Corps of Riflemen, armed with the British Infantry Rifle, more commonly known as the Baker rifle, was formed in 1800, and was brought into the line as the 95th Regiment of Foot (Rifles) in 1802. Some of the light units of the King's German Legion were also armed with the same weapon. The rifle-armed units saw extensive service, most prominently in the Peninsular War where the mountainous terrain saw them in their element.

=== Cavalry ===
At the beginning of the war, the cavalry consisted of 27 regiments organised into ten troops, each of which theoretically had 63 men. The troops were labelled with letters (A, B, C etc.) and the squadrons with numbers. As the cavalry regiments did not have a second battalion, two of these troops, known as regimental depots, were left permanently at home for recruitment and training purposes. The fighting units were grouped into escadrons: usually the smallest tactical unit that could operate independently. Heavy and medium cavalry regiments such as dragoons or cuirassiers consisted of four escadrons until the number was reduced to three by 1811. The light cavalry Hussars not only retained their four squadrons, but were even expanded by a fifth in September 1813.

=== Artillery ===
The artillery was divided into battalion artillery, mounted artillery and park artillery. The battalion artillery usually consisted of three-pounders or light six-pounders, and was normally subordinate to an infantry battalion. Mounted artillery was formed in 1793 to create a type of mobile artillery unit that would follow the cavalry to give it more firepower or to move quickly to where more firepower was needed. Park artillery was the name given to the heavier guns such as the 12 pounders. These guns were less mobile and were used to take up certain advantageous positions from which their greater penetrating power could be brought to bear.
From 1800 onwards, the distribution of pairs of guns among infantry regiments was a thing of the past; artillery had become far more centralised. Normally, foot artillery was divided into "brigades" with six to 12 guns; the term "battery", which is now associated with an artillery unit of this size, is a later invention. The unit could be further divided into sub-units, so-called "divisions", which consisted of two guns. A single crew with gun and carriage was known as a sub-division. In the Royal Horse Artillery, the tactical unit corresponding to the brigade was the "troop" with six guns. The strengths of the brigade and the troop varied depending on the campaign and they were often less than the official strength.

== Recruitment and Training ==
During the later part of the 18th century Britain was divided into three recruiting areas—with England and Wales generally called South Britain—which were further divided into Districts with their own Headquarters. Ireland had separate Districts and organisation, and Scotland, or North Britain, was one administrative area. Home defence, enforcement of law and maintenance of order was primarily the responsibility of the Militia, the Royal Veteran Battalions, the Yeomanry and the Fencibles. Another structure of Recruiting Districts and Sub-Divisions existed alongside this.

=== Recruits ===
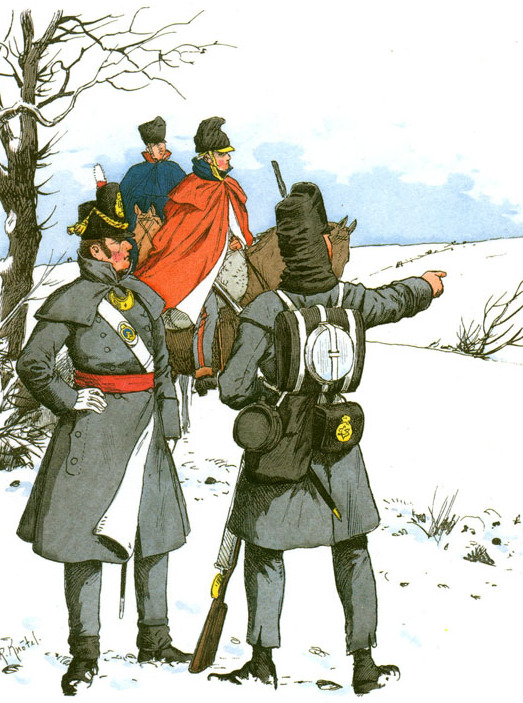
British troops in winter uniform in 1814

The British Army drew many of its raw recruits from the lowest classes of Britain. Since army life was known to be harsh, and the remuneration low, it attracted mainly those for whom civilian life was worse. The Duke of Wellington himself said that many of the men "enlist from having got bastard children – some for minor offences – some for drink". They were, he once said, "the scum of the earth; it is really wonderful that we should have made them to the fine fellows they are." In Scotland however, a number of men enlisted due to the collapse of the weaving trade and came from skilled artisan or even middle-class households. Most soldiers at the time signed on for life in exchange for a "bounty" of £23 17s 6d, a lot of which was absorbed by the cost of outfitting "necessities" but a system of 'limited service' (seven years for infantry, ten for cavalry and artillery) was introduced in 1806 to attract recruits. Soldiers began, from 1800 onward, to receive a daily beer money allowance in addition to their regular wages; the practice was started on the orders of the Duke of York. Additionally, corporal punishment was removed for a large number of petty offences.

Before 1788, the British infantry had no uniform drill system, so each commanding officer maneuvered his regiment according to his own method. When war broke out in 1793, according to historian Henry Bunbury, the British army was lax in its discipline, completely without a system and very weak in numbers. This deficiency largely persisted until Lieutenant-General John Moore began teaching his developed system of drill and maneuvers at Shorncliffe Army Camp in 1803. The foundations of the drill taught at Shorncliffe were the Rules and Regulations for the Movements of His Majesty's Infantry by General David Dundas and the Regulations for the Exercise of Riflemen by Francis de Rottenburg.

The former was published in a simplified form as A System of Dril and Manceuvres, the latter was expanded into Instructions for Light Infantry and Riflemen. Drill was a very important part of the training at Shorncliffe, and a methodically progressive course was followed from recruit to trained soldier. Recruits were first trained individually, then in squads and finally as trained soldiers in companies and battalions. The entire system consisted of three phases, each with three instructions based on weapon handling skills. First, the recruit was trained in the correct handling of his weapon. This was followed by shooting training and, finally, positioning in the correct shooting position. Once the three previous lessons had been successfully completed, the next three lessons were carried out. These included shooting in open formation, shooting while advancing and shooting while retreating.

The last three lessons included the tactical application of the first six lessons. Exercising as a squad comprised five lessons covering various formations. Next came marching at normal and fast pace, as well as turning and advancing or retreating from the right or left side of a line. The fourth lesson consisted of: Forming groups of three while standing or marching and some fairly complex pivoting movements. The drill of the battalion consisted of various movements based on the three basic formations of line, column and square: In closed formation, the rank and file were 1.5 meters apart; in open formation, three. If the battalion stopped to fire, or a section stopped to swing forward, the rear rank moved up to within 30 cm of the front rank. When the battalion marched in a line, a possible surplus unit was 4.5 m away from the rearmost unit. In an open column it was within 1.5 m of the rearmost rank; in a closed column the surplus ranks were on the flank, which was not the pivot point.<

Unlike other armies of the time, the British did not use conscription to bolster army numbers, with enlistment remaining voluntary. In periods of long service, battalions generally operated under strength; many discharges and deaths were due to wounds and disease. During the Peninsular War, the army lost almost 25,000 men from wounds and disease while fewer than 9,000 were killed directly in action; however more than 30,000 were wounded in action, and many died in the days or weeks to follow. Seriously under-strength battalions might be dissolved, merged with other remnants into "Provisional battalions" or temporarily drafted into other regiments.

=== Officers ===
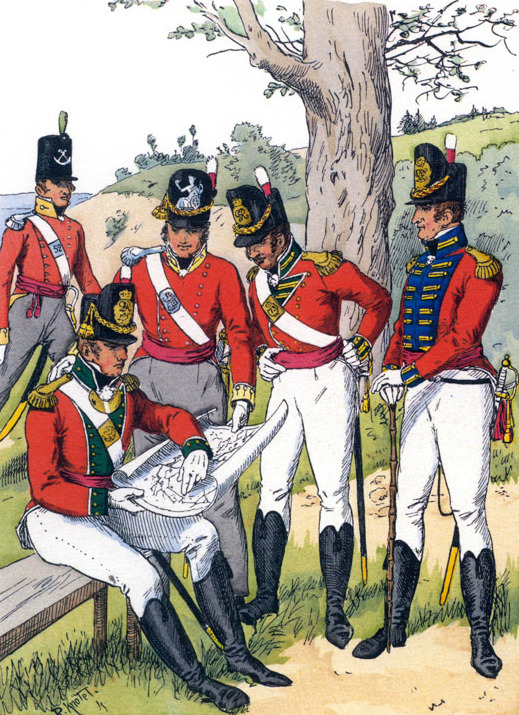
Five army officers from different regiments in 1815

Officers ranged in background also. They were expected to be literate, but otherwise came from varied educational and social backgrounds. Although an officer was supposed also to be a "gentleman", this referred to an officer's character and honourable conduct rather than his social standing. The system of sale of commissions officially governed the selection and promotion of officers, but the system was considerably relaxed during the wars. One in twenty (5%) of the officers from regular battalions had been raised from the ranks, and less than 20% of first commissions were by purchase. The Duke of York oversaw a reform of the sale of commissions, making it necessary for officers to serve two full years before either promotion or purchase to captain and six years before becoming a major, improving the quality of the officers through the experience gained.

Only a small proportion of officers were from the nobility; in 1809, only 140 officers were peers or peers' sons. A large proportion of officers came from the Militia, and a small number had been gentlemen volunteers, who trained and fought as private soldiers but messed with the officers and remained as such until vacancies (without purchase) for commissions became available. Promotion was mainly by seniority; fewer than 20% of line promotions were by purchase, although this proportion was higher in the Household Division. Promotion by merit alone occurred, but was less common. By 1814 there were over 10,000 officers in the army.

== Civilian support network ==
Britain mobilized a vast civilian support network to support its 1 million soldiers. Historian Jenny Uglow (2015) explores a multitude of connections between the Army and its support network, as summarized by a review of her book by Christine Haynes: a whole host of other civilian, actors, including: army contractors, who provided massive quantities of tents, knapsacks, canteens, uniforms, shoes, muskets, gunpowder, ships, maps, fortifications, meat, and biscuit; bankers and speculators, who funded the supplies as well as subsidies to Britain's allies...revenue agents, who collected the wide variety of taxes imposed to finance the wars; farmers, whose fortunes rose and fell not just with the weather but with the war; elites, who amidst war maintained many of the same old routines and amusements; workers, when the context of war found opportunities for new jobs and higher wages but also grievances that led to strikes and riots; and the poor, who suffered immensely through much of this....[And women who] participated in the war not just as relations of combatants but as sutlers, prostitutes, laundresses, spinners, bandage-makers, and drawing-room news-followers.

== Tactics ==
In the aftermath of the American War of Independence, during which the British infantry had fought in looser formations than previously, rigid close-order linear formations had been advocated by Major General David Dundas. His 1792 Rules and regulations for the formations, field-exercise, and movements, of His Majesty's forces became the standard drill book for the infantry. As the wars progressed line infantry tactics were developed to allow more flexibility for command and control, placing more reliance upon the officers on the spot for quick reactions. The line formation was the most favoured, as it offered the maximum firepower, about 1000 to 1500 bullets per minute.
Though the manual laid down that lines were to be formed in three ranks, the lines were often formed only two ranks deep, especially in the Peninsula. While the French favoured column formation, the line formation enabled all muskets available to fire at the enemy. In contrast, only the few soldiers in the first rows of the column (about 60) were able to fire. British infantry were far better trained in musketry than most armies on the continent (30 rounds per man in training for example, compared with only 10 in the Austrian Army) and their volleys were notably steady and effective. The standard weapon of the British infantry was the "India Pattern" version of the Brown Bess musket. This had an effective range of 100 yards, but fire was often reserved until a charging enemy was within 50 yards. Although the French infantry (and, earlier, the Americans) frequently used buck and ball in their muskets, the British infantry used only standard ball ammunition.

== Uniforms, equipment, rewards ==
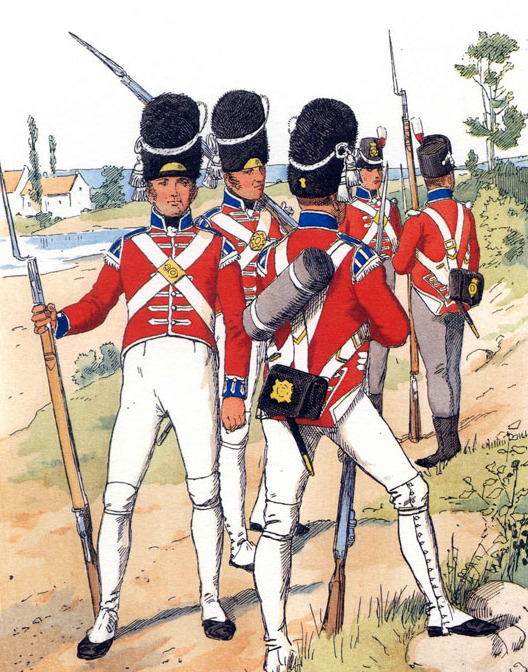
Troops from different foot guards regiments in 1815

While the red jacket is regarded as the archetypal British uniform, it is evident that there were considerable variations and distinctions between units and ranks. One can cite, for instance, the case of Wellington's elite Foot Guards. With regard to the uniforms of private soldiers and non-commissioned officers, it is notable that the jackets worn by sergeants were distinctive in that they were embellished with gold lace. The jacket was scarlet and lined throughout — the sleeve with linen and the other parts with white serge. The skirts were of a shorter length and sewn back, furnished with white serge lining and edged with gold lace. A single-breasted jacket, buttoned across the front, was worn, with the left side edged with gold. The buttons were gilt and set at distinct intervals, while the loops were of gold lace, with the number and spacing of the loops varying according to the regiment. Finally, the dark blue collar, cuffs, wings and shoulder straps were trimmed with gold lace.

There was no standardised supply for uniforms, and it was generally left to the regimental colonel to contract for and obtain uniforms for his men, which allowed for some regimental variation. Generally, this was in the form of specific regimental badges, or ornamentation for specialised flank companies, but occasionally major differences existed. Highland regiments wore kilts and ostrich feather hats, although six of these regiments exchanged the kilt for regulation trousers or tartan trews in 1809. Officers of Highland regiments wore a crimson silk sash worn from the left shoulder to the right hip. Regimental tartans were worn but they were all derived from the Black Watch tartan. White, yellow or red lines were added to distinguish between regiments. Trousers for the rank and file were generally of white cotton duck canvas for summer use, and grey woollen trousers were issued for winter wear, although considerable variation exists in the color of the woollen trousers. Originally, the white trousers were cut as overalls, designed to be worn to protect the expensive breeches and gaiters worn by the rank and file, although on campaign, they were often worn by themselves; a practice which was later permitted except on parade. Soldiers were also issued with grey greatcoats starting in 1803.

From the last years of the eighteenth century, the bicorne hat was replaced in 1800 by a cylindrical pattern infantry shako (known today as the "stovepipe"). In 1812, this was replaced by the false-fronted 1812 pattern infantry shako (known today as the "Belgic"). Despite modern literary claims to the contrary light infantry (including Rifle regiments) also converted to the 1812 pattern infantry shako from April 1813 as a letter by Colonel Sir Andrew Barnard of the 95th Rifles states:- " I have had caps enough in store to help the appearance of the 1st Batt. as it used to be but the 2nd and 3rd sport bang ups as the soldiers of the 52nd who were the first in the Division that put them on have christened them.." All regiments were expected to be compliant with regulations by April 1814. Grenadiers and Foot Guards continued to be issued bearskins, but these were not worn while on campaign.

It was in 1802, during this period of uniform transition, that enlisted soldier rank insignia were first designated by chevrons. Their introduction allowed the rapid differentiation of sergeants and corporals from private soldiers. Colour sergeant and lance corporal ranks soon evolved as well.Officers were responsible for providing (and paying for) their own uniforms. Consequently, variable styles and decorations were present, according to the officer's private means. Officers in the Infantry wore scarlet coattees with long tails fastened with turnbacks. Close-fitting white pantaloons, tucked into tall Hessian or riding boots were worn, often covered with grey wool and leather overalls on campaign, in addition to a dark blue, later grey, double-breasted greatcoat. After 1811, officers were permitted to wear a short tailed coatee, grey pantaloons or trousers and low field boots on campaign. Officers wore silver or gold epaulettes (depending on regimental colours), with regimental badge to designate rank.

An 1810 order stipulated that subalterns wore one epaulette, on the right shoulder, while captains wore one of a more ornate pattern on the right shoulder. Field officers wore one on each shoulder, badged with a star (for majors), a crown (lieutenant colonels) or star and crown (colonels). Grenadier, fusilier and light infantry officers wore more ornate versions of the shoulder wings their men wore on both shoulders; trimmed with lace, chain or bullion.

Generals, from 1812, wore an aiguillette over the right shoulder, and rank was denoted by the spacing of buttons on the coatee: Major generals wore their buttons in pairs, lieutenant generals in threes and full generals wore their buttons singly spaced. Until the issue of the 1812 pattern infantry cap (or "Belgic") in 1812, company officers wore bicorne hats; afterwards, they usually wore the same headgear as their men while on campaign, their status as officers denoted with braided cords. Generals, field officers and staff officers generally wore bicorne hats. Officers were usually armed with the poorly-regarded 1796 Pattern British Infantry Officer's Sword. In light infantry units and the flank companies of line units, they carried the Pattern 1803 sabre instead. In highland regiments, most officers carried a basket-hilted claymore.

=== Medals ===
Apart from the orders of chivalry, which were restricted to the higher commissioned ranks, the Army Gold Medal and the even rarer Army Gold Cross, which were awarded for actions between 1806 and 1814, were the only other official methods of rewarding brave or meritorious conduct. These were awarded to ranks not lower than an officer who had commanded his battalion or regiment. A small number of medals were presented by their regiments to deserving soldiers, the majority of which were not governed by any system. However, there are exceptions, such as the 'Order of Merit' of the 5th Foot, instituted in 1767, and the long-service medal of the 71st, instituted probably before 1808. Some of the more renowned regimental distinctions, such as those bestowed by the 42nd, 48th and 88th regiments, although commemorating contributions during the Peninsular War, were only established following the conclusion of the Napoleonic Wars. It is notable that there were few regimental badges of distinction. For example, the crowns and stars worn over the rank chevrons by the 28th Foot, the long-service stripes worn above the cuff by the 72nd, and the 52nd's 'VS' badge ('Valiant Stormer', awarded to survivors of the 'forlorn hope' of Ciudad Rodrigo and Badajoz) are examples of such distinctions.

=== Cavalry ===
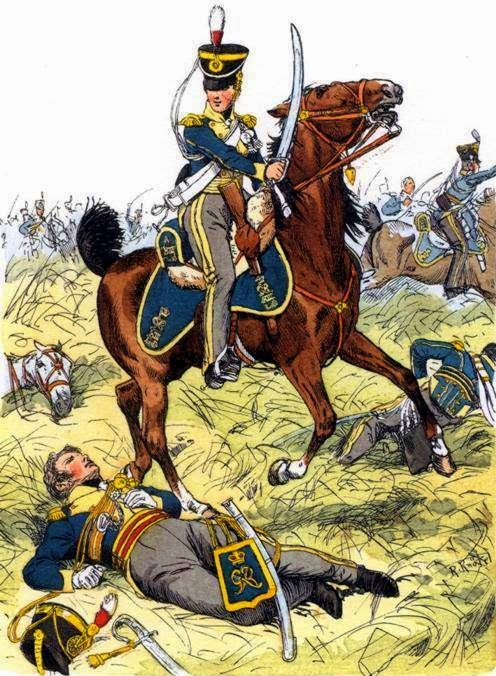
Uniforms of British light dragoons between 1813 and 1815

At the start of the French Revolutionary Wars, the "heavy" cavalry were equivalent to dragoons or "medium" cavalry in the French and other armies. They consisted of three regiments of Household Cavalry, seven regiments of Dragoon Guards and six regiments of Dragoons. The Dragoon Guards had been regiments of heavy cavalry in the eighteenth century, but had been converted to dragoons to save money. The heavy cavalry wore red jackets and bicorne hats. The light cavalry units consisted of fourteen regiments of Light Dragoons, which had been formed during the eighteenth century to carry out the roles of scouting and patrolling. The light dragoons wore short blue braided jackets and the leather Tarleton helmet.

== Foreign units in British service ==
=== German ===
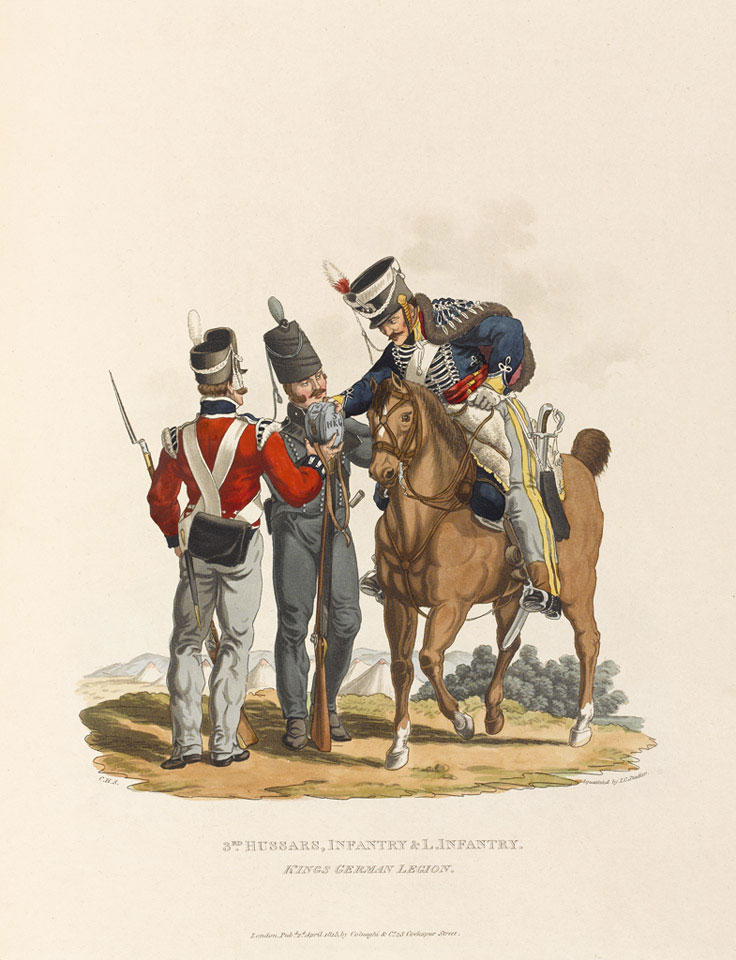
KGL line infantryman, light infantryman and hussar in 1815

The largest émigré corps was the King's German Legion (KGL), which was formed in 1803 and was composed mainly of German exiles from Hanover and other north German states. In total, it formed two dragoon regiments (which later became light dragoons), three hussar regiments, eight line and two light infantry battalions, and five artillery batteries. Although it never fought as an independent force, its units were often brigaded together. The units of the Legion were regarded as the equal of the best regular British units.

The Brunswick Ducal Field-Corps, also better known by their nickname the Black Brunswickers was raised in 1809 when the War of the Fifth Coalition began between France and Austria. Fighting alongside the Austrians, they refused the peace treaty that was eventually signed between Austria and France, fighting their way through Germany before being evacuated to the British Isles where they entered British service. They then fought in the Peninsular War where their ranks were extremely diminished, as a result of a lack of recruits. After regaining their duchy, the unit was yet again placed under the British where they fought fiercely at the Battle of Quatre Bras and later Waterloo, where their leader fell in battle with the forces eventually disbanding after the victory and returning to Brunswick.

=== Dutch ===
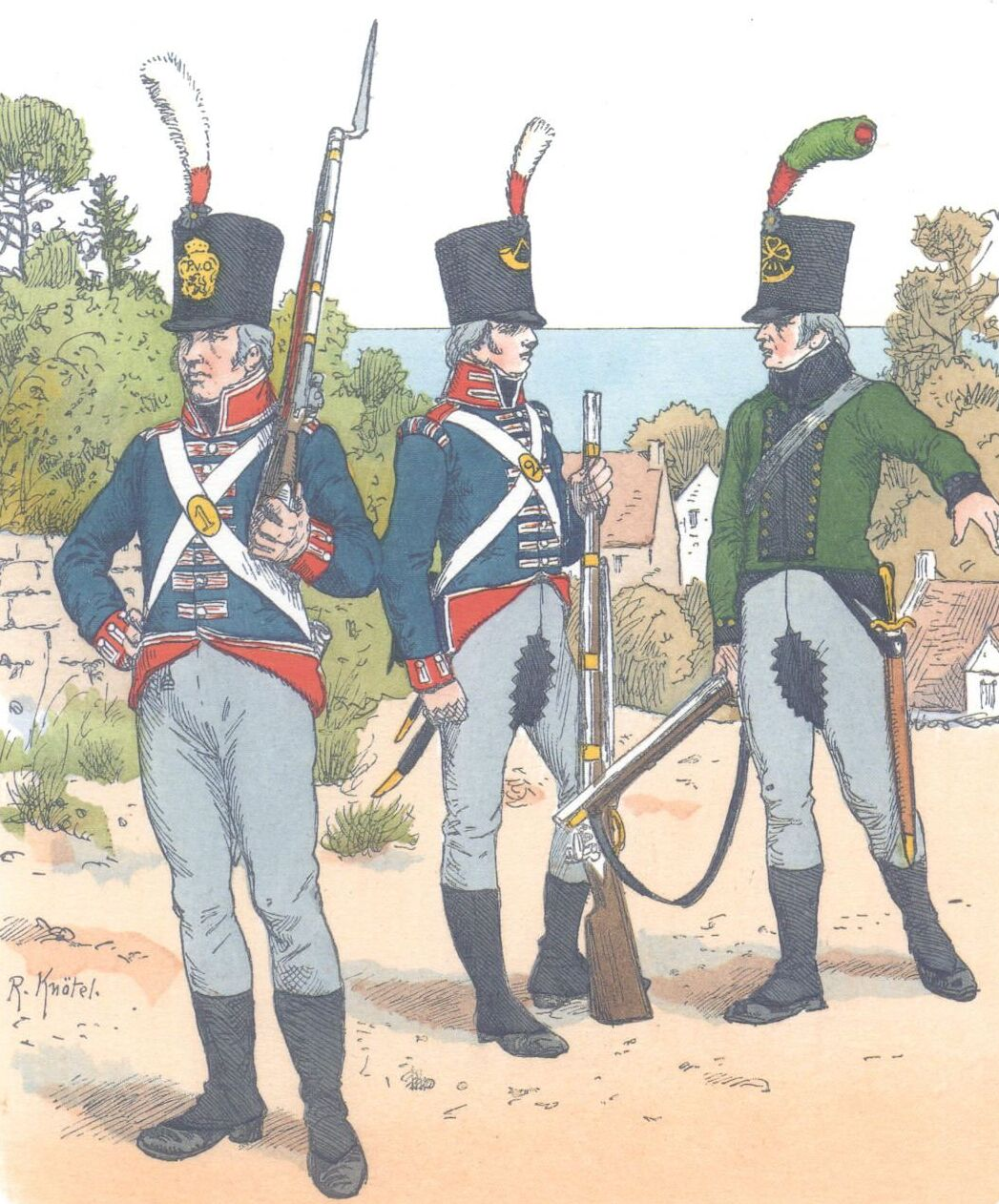
Three King's Dutch Brigade soldiers

The King's Dutch Brigade was formed from former personnel of the Dutch States Army (defunct since 1795), who had emigrated to Germany and Britain after the Dutch Republic was overthrown by the Batavian Republic; from deserters from the Batavian army; and mutineers of the Batavian naval squadron that had surrendered to the Royal Navy in the Vlieter Incident, all during the Anglo-Russian invasion of Holland in 1799. The brigade was commissioned on 21 October 1799 on the Isle of Wight, after it had been organised by the Hereditary Prince of Orange who had been an allied commander during the Flanders campaign of 1793–95. The troops swore allegiance, both to the British Crown, and to the defunct States-General of the Netherlands, the former sovereign power in the Dutch Republic. The troops received both the King's Colours and regimental colours after Dutch model.

The brigade counted four regiments of infantry of 18 companies each, 1 regiment of Chasseurs (also of 18 companies), 1 battalion of artillery of 6 companies, and a corps of engineers (96 companies total). The brigade was used in Ireland in 1801, and later on the Channel Islands. It was decommissioned on 12 July 1802, after the Peace of Amiens, after which most personnel (but not all) returned to the Batavian Republic, under an amnesty in connection with that treaty.The Dutch Emigrant Artillery was formed in Hanover in 1795 from remnants of Franco-Dutch units. It consisted of three companies and between 1796 and 1803 served in the West Indies to man guns in forts there. In 1803 it was amalgamated into the Royal Foreign Artillery.

=== French ===
The Chasseurs Britanniques were originally formed from French Royalist emigres in 1801, and served throughout the wars. The unit served chiefly in the Mediterranean until 1811, when it participated in the later stages of the Peninsular War. It had a good record in battle but later became notorious for desertion, and was not even allowed to perform outpost duty, for fears that the pickets would abscond. In 1812, the Independent Companies of Foreigners were formed from among French prisoners of war for service in North America. The companies became notorious for lack of discipline and atrocities in Chesapeake Bay, and were disbanded.

=== Swiss ===
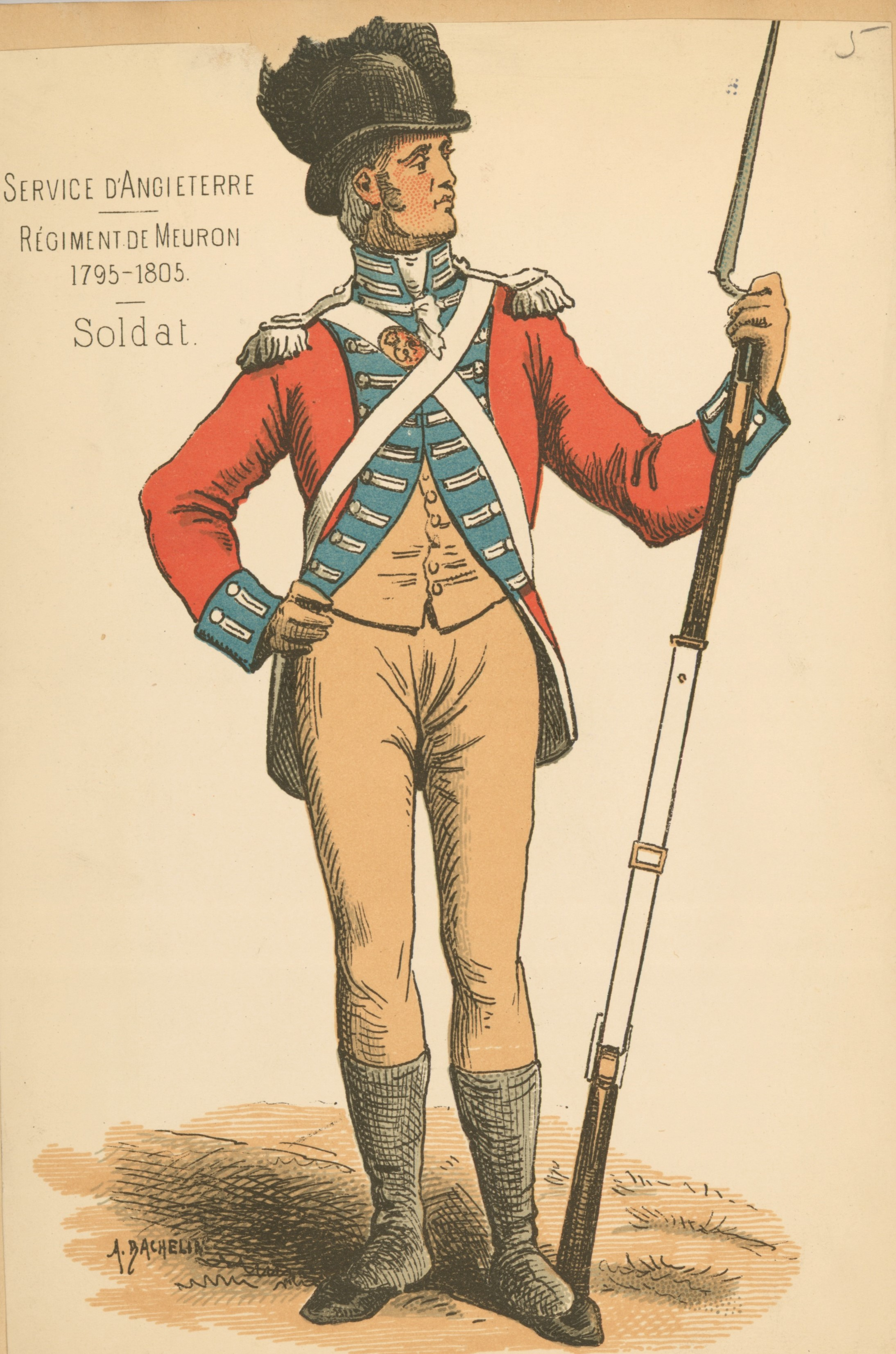
A Regiment de Meuron private

The nominally Swiss Regiment de Meuron was transferred from the Dutch East India Company in Ceylon in 1798. It consisted even when first transferred of soldiers of mixed nationalities, and later recruited from among prisoners of war and deserters from all over Europe. It later served in North America. Two Swiss units in French service were also taken into British service about the same time. The Regiment de Roll was originally created from the disbanded Swiss Guards in the pay of France. Dillon's regiment was also formed from Swiss émigrés from French service. These two regiments were merged into a single provisional battalion, termed the Roll-Dillon battalion, at some stage in the Peninsular War. The Regiment de Watteville was another nominally Swiss unit, which actually consisted of many nationalities. It was formed in 1801 from the debris of four Swiss regiments formed by the British for Austrian service, and served at the Siege of Cádiz and in Canada in 1814.

=== Greek ===
The British Army also raised units in territories that were allied to Britain or that British troops occupied. These included the Royal Sicilian Volunteers and two battalions of Greek Light Infantry. Initially the 1st Regiment Greek Light Infantry was formed, which by 1812 became the 1st (Duke of York's) Greek Light Infantry Regiment and in 1813 a second regiment composed of 454 Greeks 2nd Regiment Greek Light Infantry) which occupied Paxoi islands. These regiments included many of the men who were afterwards among the leaders of the Greeks in the War of Independence, such as Theodoros Kolokotronis.

== Living conditions ==
The British barracks offered only rudimentary living facilities that were little better than prisons. Twenty men were housed in a room about 2.1 metres high, 9.1 metres long and 6 metres wide, with a foul-smelling atmosphere (the urinals consisted of nothing more than wooden buckets). Quarters for married couples were created by partitioning off part of the barracks with the help of blankets. On campaigns, soldiers often lived in improvised shelters made of branches, leaves and straw - until the early 1810s, tents were not widely available in the army. If no material could be found, the soldiers simply rolled up on the ground in their coats and blankets. Soldiers who violated the military rules even under these harsh conditions could be punished with a harsh punishment system. As a rule, only a general court martial could impose the death penalty. Other punishments could include flogging (up to a theoretical maximum of 1,200 lashes) or transfer to a punishment battalion.

=== Food ===
The soldiers were mostly dependent on themselves for food. There were no cooks; each man took turns to prepare the daily meals, breakfast and lunch. Anything over and above the ration issued had to be bought out of the shilling per day that each soldier received. The daily ration consisted of half a pound of bread and 1 pound (450 g) of beef (including bones) and a quart (1.1 litres) of beer. The beef was always cooked, which resulted in half a litre of broth per day. During the Spanish War of Independence, the ration was 1 pound of biscuits or half a pound of bread, 1 pound of beef or mutton and a pint of wine or 1/3 pint (0.19 litres) of rum. Sometimes the soldiers were put on half rations, or received only one pound of bad beef a day for a whole week. If no bread was available, the men were given half a litre of unground wheat or a sheaf of wheat from the field, or two pounds of potatoes. Some regiments endeavoured to provide their men with a more balanced diet, such as the weekly rations for six men: 42 pounds of bread, 28 pounds of meat, 7 quarts of spirits, 6 quarts of oatmeal, 4 quarts of peas.

=== Marriage ===
Soldiers were allowed to marry, but wives were expected to submit to army rules and discipline, as well to contribute to regimental affairs by performing washing, cooking and other duties. Six women per company were officially "on the strength" and could accompany their husbands on active service, receiving rations and places on troop transports. If there was competition for these places, selections would be made by ballot. Many soldiers also found wives or companions from amongst the local populations, whose presence in the army train was generally tolerated, despite being beyond the quota. However, at the conclusion of the Peninsular War only those wives officially on the strength were allowed to return to Britain with their husbands, resulting in a large number of women and children abandoned in France, with no provisions or means of returning to their homes. Officers also needed permission from their commanding officers to marry, and for their wives to accompany them, but they were not subject to quota, although restrictions might be made due to the officer's age or seniority.

=== Pay ===
In the 1790s, a soldier's pay was 1 shilling per day. Of this, he had to pay 1½ pence a day for bread and meat. A total of 5 shillings and 6 pence per week was withheld for transportation and equipment. After deducting all costs, he was left with just over 18 shillings net per year. The daily pay for officers ranged from 4 shillings 8 pence for a cornet/ensign to 32 shillings 10 pence for a colonel. To create an additional incentive to join the army, recruits received a hand bonus of 7 pounds 12 shillings and 6 pence. In 1812 this bonus was increased to 23 pounds 17 shillings and 6 pence.

=== Medical care ===
At the beginning of the 19th century, the Army Medical Service had a Director General based at the Army Medical Board in London as well as inspectors and deputy inspectors in the respective theatres of war, to whom staff surgeons, regimental surgeons and assistants were subordinate in descending order of rank. In addition to the regimental surgeon, there was a hospital mate and several staff doctors in the military hospital. However, there was no organised medical corps; each medical officer wore the uniform of his respective regiment. There was often a lack of competent medical officers. In 1799, the medical officer of the West Middlesex Militia, Dr Hugh Moises, criticised the training of assistant surgeons, noting that a tailor, shoemaker or carpenter had to serve an apprenticeship before they could open a shop, whereas a man's appointment as assistant surgeon required only a passing acquaintance with medical matters brought about by family connections or patronage.

Treating the wounded was only a small part of the medical officers' duties. By far the largest part consisted of caring for the sick. Among the most devastating ailments were tropical diseases, which caused a high mortality rate. The treatments for such ailments were sometimes unusual: for example, an infusion of rue, sage, mint, rosemary and wormwood in strong vinegar was recommended as a cure for typhoid fever, to which camphor dissolved in brandy was added. This mixture was rubbed into the face and loins. Others tried to cure themselves of yellow fever by drinking a decoction of boiling Madeira viper's bugloss. Medical care during a battle was usually primitive and completely unhygienic. Depending on when a wounded man was brought in, it could take up to twenty minutes for a leg or arm to be amputated. If the surgeon had already performed a large number of amputations, his instruments such as the bone saw were usually already blunt. If the soldier was wounded very early in the battle, the instruments were still sharp so that a skilful surgeon could perform an amputation in just a few minutes.

== Campaigns ==
=== French Revolutionary Wars ===
==== Mysore, 1789–1792 ====
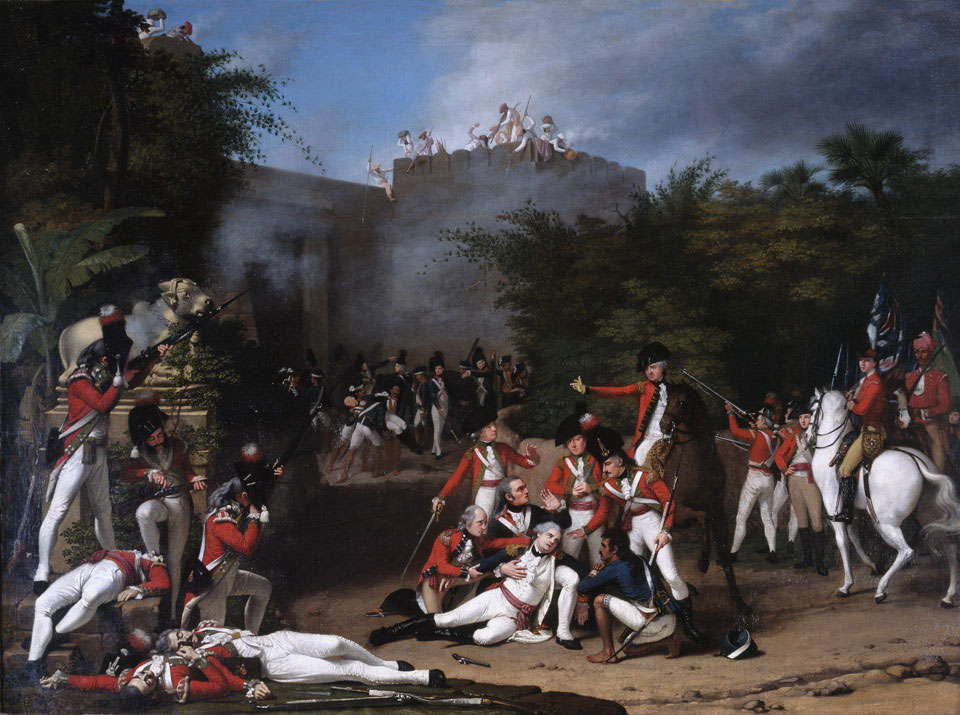
1793 painting of the siege of Bangalore

The first major engagement involving the British army during the Revolutionary period was the Third Anglo-Mysore War, between Kingdom of Mysore supported by France and led by Tipu Sultan, and the British East India Company supported by its local allies. British regular infantry and artillery regiments formed the core of the East India Company army serving under the command of British general Lord Cornwallis. After some initial setbacks, Cornwallis was ultimately victorious capturing the Mysorean capital city of Seringapatam and compelling Mysore to make peace on terms favourable to Britain.

==== Flanders, 1793–1795 ====
In this theatre a British army under the command of the Duke of York formed part of an Allied army with Hanoverian, Dutch, Hessian, Austrian and Prussian contingents, which faced the French Republican Armée du Nord, the Armée des Ardennes and the Armée de la Moselle. The Allies enjoyed several early victories, (including a largely British-fought battle at Lincelles), but were unable to advance beyond the French border fortresses and were eventually forced to withdraw by a series of victorious French counter-offensives.

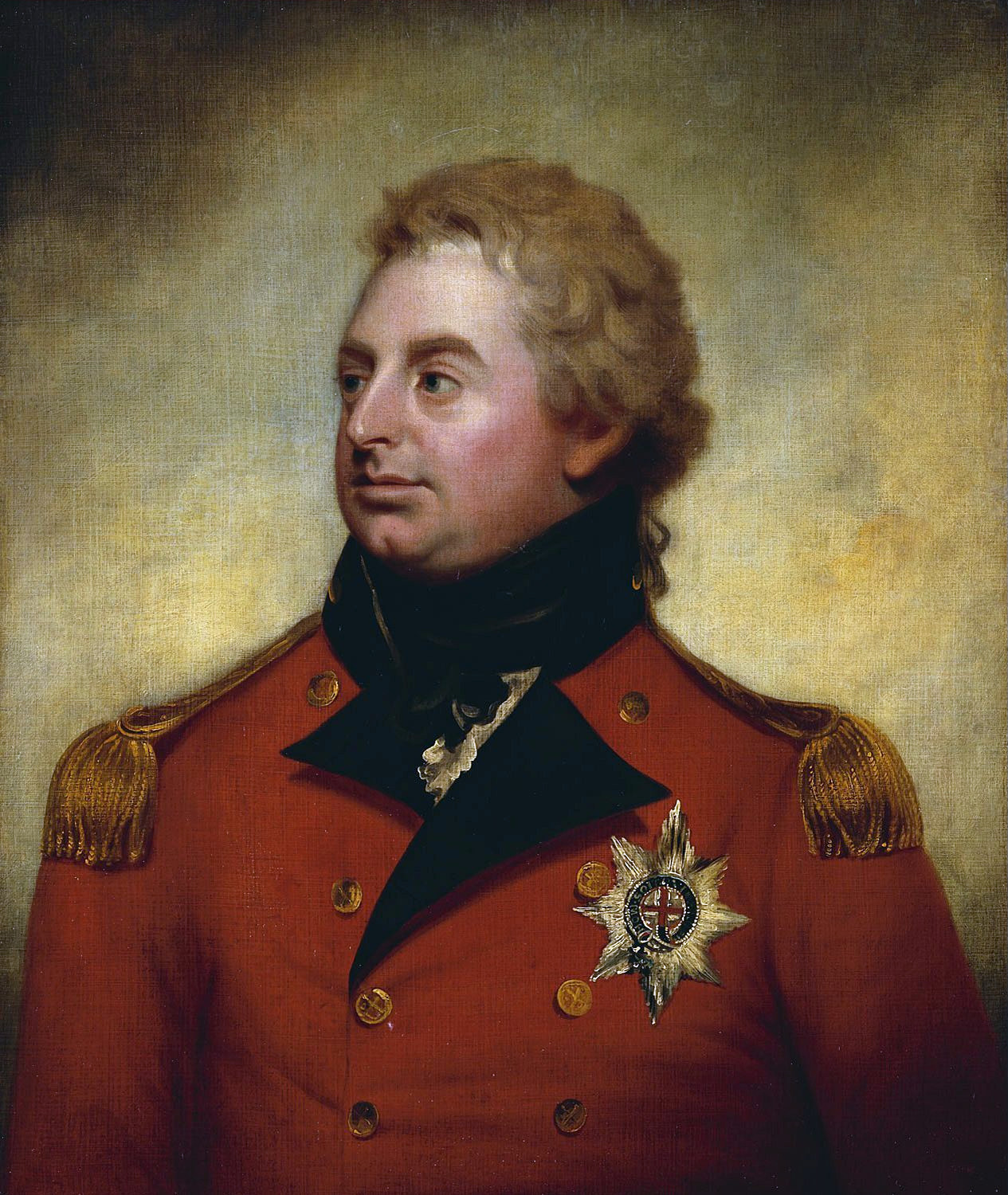
The Duke of York led British-allied forces through two ill-fated campaigns in the Netherlands.

The Allies then established a new front in southern Holland and Germany, but with poor co-ordination and failing supplies were forced to continue their retreat through the arduous winter of 1794/5. By spring 1795 the British force had left Dutch territory entirely, and reached the port of Bremen where they were evacuated. The campaign exposed many shortcomings in the British army, especially in discipline and logistics, which had developed in the ten years of peacetime neglect since the American War of Independence.

==== West Indies, 1793–1798 ====
The other major British effort in the early French Revolutionary Wars was mounted against the French possessions in the West Indies. This was mainly for trade considerations; not only were the French West Indian islands valuable due to their plantation-based economy, but they acted as bases for French privateers who preyed on British merchant ships. The resulting five-year campaign crippled the whole British Army through disease, especially yellow fever. Out of 89,000 British soldiers who served in the West Indies, 43,747 died of yellow fever or other tropical diseases. Another 15,503 were discharged, no longer fit for service, or deserted. The islands of Martinique, Guadeloupe and several ports in Saint-Domingue were captured in 1794 and 1795 by expeditionary forces under General Charles Grey, but the British units were almost exterminated by disease. Haitian insurgents which had first welcomed the British as allies turned against them. Guadeloupe was recaptured in 1796 by Victor Hugues, who subsequently executed 865 French Royalists and other prisoners. Eight thousand reinforcements under Lieutenant General Sir Ralph Abercromby arrived in 1796, and secured many French territories, and those of Spain and the Netherlands (which was now titled the Batavian Republic and allied to France). However, the decimated British troops evacuated Haiti, and Guadeloupe was never recaptured, becoming a major privateering base and black market emporium.

==== Muizenberg and Ceylon 1795 ====
In 1795 a combined British army and Royal Navy force under the command of Major-General James Craig and Admiral Elphinstone captured the Dutch Cape Colony. It remained in British possession for seven years until the Peace of Amiens. At the same time another British force captured the Dutch colony of Trincomalee, Ceylon, which remained in British possession until 1948.

==== Ireland 1798 ====
A rebellion inspired by a secret society, the Society of United Irishmen, broke out in Ireland. The British Army in Ireland consisted partly of regular troops but mostly of Protestant militia and Irish Yeomanry units. The rebellion was marked by atrocities on both sides. After the rebellion had already failed, a French expedition under General Humbert landed in the west of Ireland. After inflicting an embarrassing defeat on a British militia force at the Battle of Castlebar, Humbert's outnumbered army was surrounded and forced to surrender.

==== Mysore, 1798–1799 ====
This was the last war fought between the East India Company and the Kingdom of Mysore. British regular regiments again formed part of the East India Company army, this time under the command of British general George Harris. The British forces defeated Mysore for the final time, capturing Seringapatam and killing Tipu Sultan.

==== Holland 1799 ====
As part of the War of the Second Coalition, a joint Anglo-Russian force invaded the Netherlands. Although the British troops captured the Dutch fleet, but after the defeat at the Battle of Castricum, the expedition was a failure and the British commander in chief, the Duke of York negotiated a capitulation which allowed the British to sail away unmolested.

==== Egypt ====
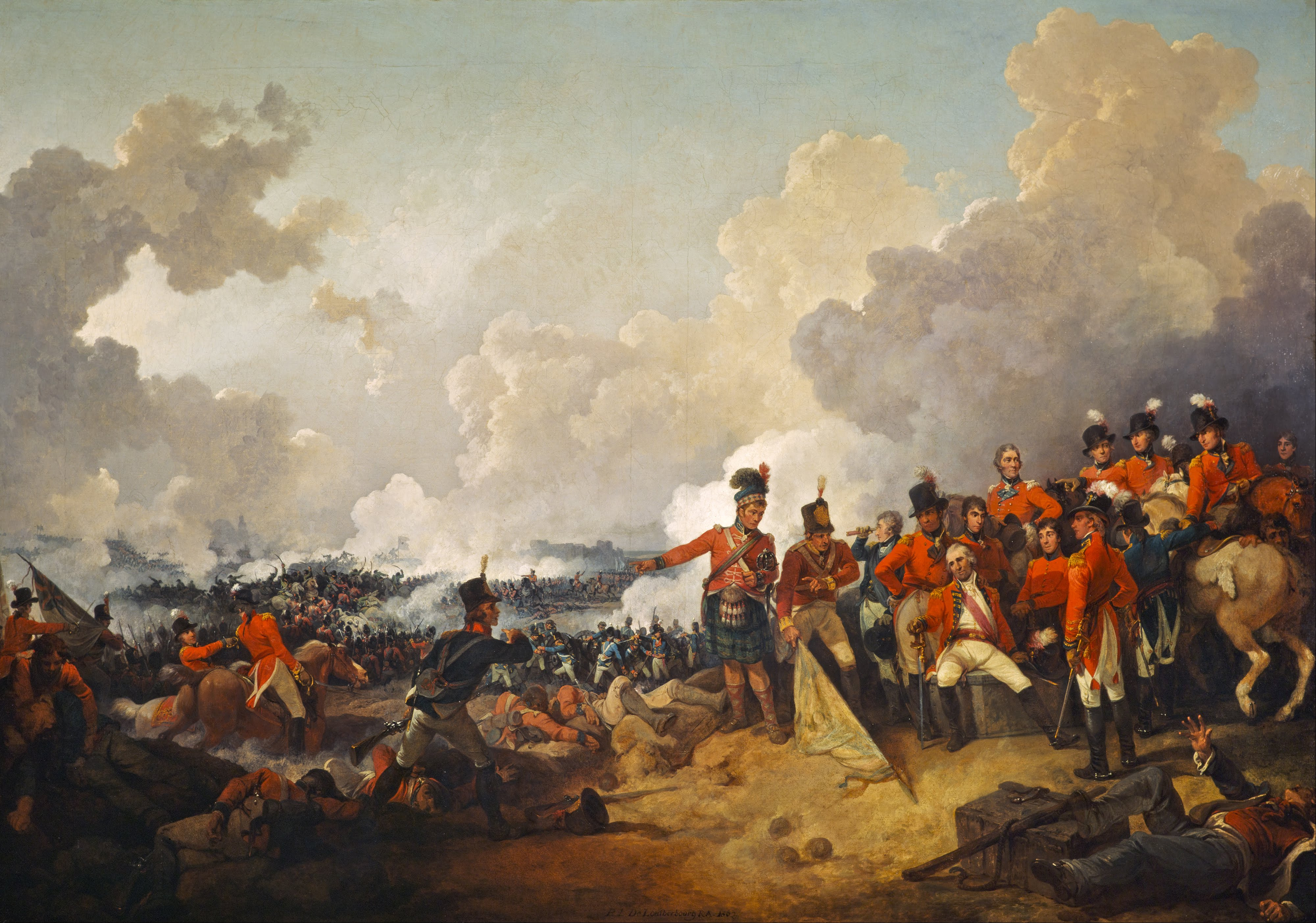
The Battle of Alexandria by Philip James de Loutherbourg. Abercromby's victory over the French at the Battle of Alexandria, resulted in the end of France's military presence in Egypt.

In 1798, Napoleon Bonaparte had invaded Egypt, as a stepping stone to India, which was the source of much of Britain's trade and wealth. He was stranded there when Vice Admiral Nelson destroyed the French fleet at the Battle of the Nile. In alliance with the Ottoman Empire, Britain mounted an expedition to expel the French from Egypt. After careful preparations and rehearsals in Turkish anchorages, a British force under Sir Ralph Abercromby made a successful opposed landing at the Battle of Abukir (1801). Abercromby was mortally wounded at the Battle of Alexandria, where the British troops demonstrated the effectiveness of their musketry, improved discipline and growing experience. The French capitulated and were evacuated from Egypt in British ships.

=== Peace of Amiens ===
After Britain's allies all signed treaties with France, Britain also signed the Treaty of Amiens, under which Britain restored many captured territories to France and its allies. The "peace" proved merely to be an interlude, with plotting and preparations for a renewal of war continuing on both sides.

=== Napoleonic Wars ===
==== Maratha, 1803–1805 ====
Shortly after the resumption of war on the continent, the East India Company once again became involved in war with an Indian power, this time with the Maratha Empire, supported by France. British regiments of infantry, artillery and cavalry once again formed the core of the Company army, this time under the command of British generals Gerrard Lake and Arthur Wellesley. Maratha forces were defeated decisively at Assaye and Delhi and further losses eventually compelled them to make peace.

==== West Indies, 1803–1810 ====
When war resumed, Britain once again attacked the French possessions in the West Indies. The French army which had been sent to wrest Saint-Domingue from Toussaint Louverture in 1801 had, like the British army earlier, been ravaged by disease, so only isolated garrisons opposed the British forces. In 1805, as part of the manoeuvres which ultimately led to the Battle of Trafalgar, a French fleet carrying 6,500 troops briefly attacked Dominica and other islands but subsequently withdrew. In 1808, once the British were allied to Portugal and Spain, they were able to concentrate their forces and capture the French possessions one by one; Cayenne and Martinique in 1809, and Guadeloupe in 1810; Saint-Domingue had declared its independence as Haiti in 1804.

==== Hanover 1805 ====
In 1805 news arrived in London that Napoleon had broken up his invasion camp at Boulogne, and was marching across Germany. The Prime Minister of the United Kingdom William Pitt immediately equipped an army of 15,000 men, and deployed it to Hanover under the command of General William Cathcart, with the intention of linking up with another allied Russian army and creating a diversion in favour of Austria, but Cathcart made no attempt to attack the flank of the far larger French army. Cathcart established his headquarters at Bremen, seized Hanover, fought a small battle at Munkaiser, and then peacefully waited for news. After the death of Pitt and news of the Franco-Prussian agreement handing control of Hanover to Prussia, the ministry recalled Cathcart's army from Germany.

==== Naples 1805 ====
One of Britain's allies was Ferdinand I of the Two Sicilies, whose kingdom was important to British interests in the Mediterranean. In 1805 British forces under the command of General James Craig were part of an Anglo-Russian force intended to secure the Kingdom of Naples. However, after a brief occupation the allied position became untenable with the news of the disastrous Austrian defeat at the Battle of Ulm.

==== Sicily and the Mediterranean ====
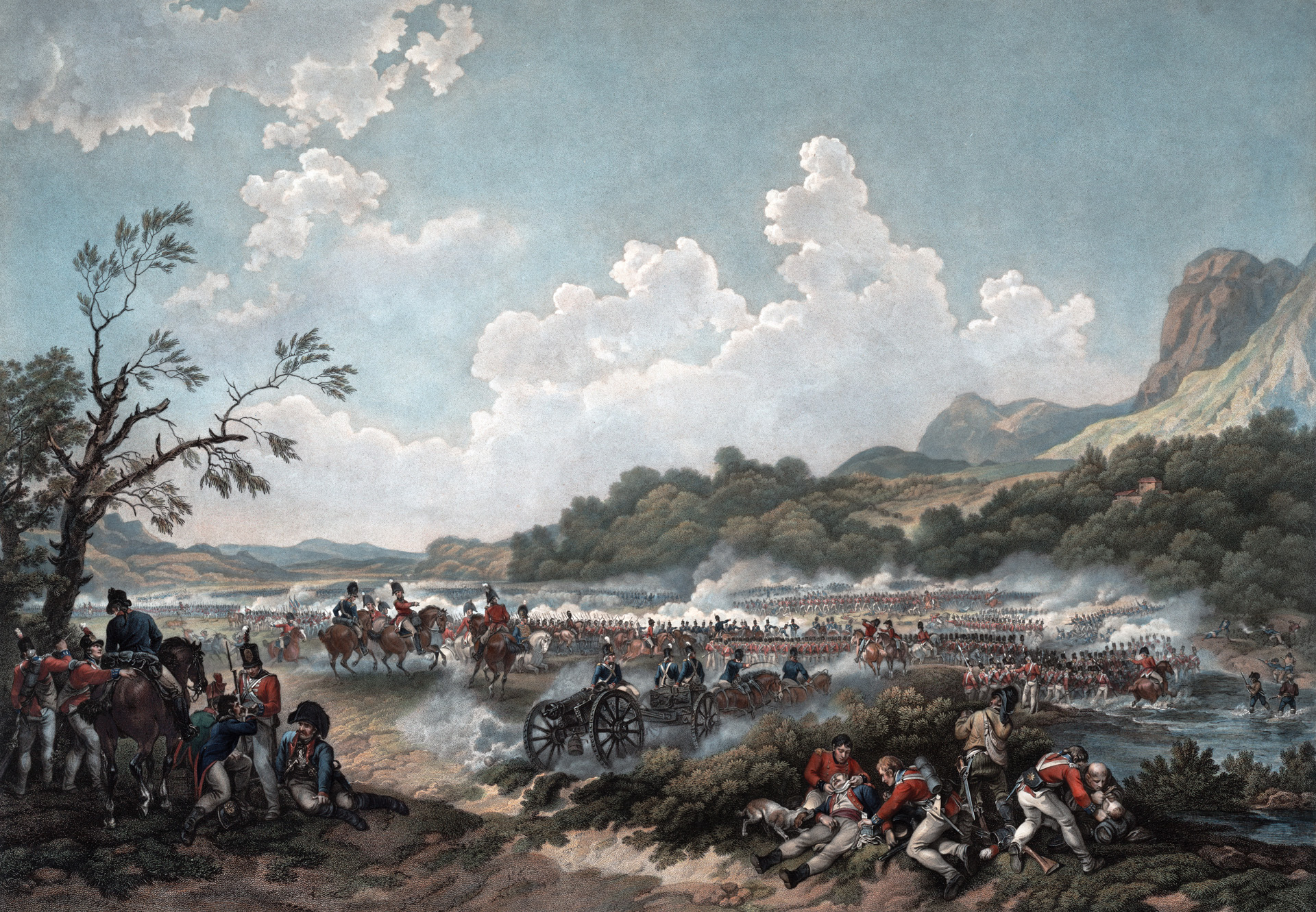
Engraving of a painting of the Battle of Maida by Philip James de Loutherbourg

In 1806, French troops invaded southern Italy, and British troops again went to aid the defenders. A British army under the command of General John Stuart won a lopsided victory at the Battle of Maida. For the rest of the war, British troops defended Sicily, forcing Ferdinand to make liberal reforms. An allied force consisting mainly of Corsicans, Maltese and Sicilians was driven from Capri in 1808. The next year, British troops occupied several Greek and Dalmatian islands, although the French garrison on Corfu was too strong to be attacked. The British retained their Greek islands until the end of the wars.

==== South Africa and the Plate ====
The Dutch colony at the Cape of Good Hope was a vital port of call on the long sea voyage to India. An expedition was sent to capture it in 1805. (It had first been captured in 1796, but was returned under the Treaty of Amiens.) British troops under Lieutenant General Sir David Baird won the Battle of Blaauwberg in January 1806, forcing the surrender of the colony.

The naval commander of the expedition, Admiral Home Riggs Popham then conceived the idea of occupying the Spanish Plate River colonies. A detachment under Major General William Carr Beresford occupied Buenos Aires for six weeks, but was expelled by Spanish troops and local militias. General Auchmuty mounted a second invasion of the region in 1807, capturing Montevideo. Lieutenant General Sir John Whitelocke was sent from Britain to take command in the region, arriving at the same time as Major General Robert Craufurd, whose destination had been changed several times by the government, and whose troops had been aboard ship for several months. Whitelock launched a bungled attack on Buenos Aires on 5 July 1807, in which the British troops suffered heavy casualties and were trapped in the city. Finally he capitulated, and the troops returned ignominiously to Britain.

==== Denmark ====
In August 1807, an expedition was mounted to Copenhagen, to seize the Danish fleet to prevent it falling into French hands. The expedition was led by General Lord Cathcart. A British land force under the command of Wellesley routed 7,000 Danish militiamen. After the city was bombarded for several days, the Danes surrendered their fleet.

==== Alexandria ====
In 1807 an army and navy expedition under the command of General Alexander Mackenzie Fraser was dispatched with the objective of capturing the Egyptian city of Alexandria to secure a base of operations to disrupt the Ottoman Empire. The people of Alexandria, being disaffected towards Muhammad Ali of Egypt, opened the gates of the city to the British forces, allowing for one of the easiest conquests of a city by the British forces during the Napoleonic Wars. However, due to lack of supplies, and inconclusive operations against the Egyptian forces, the Expedition was forced to re-embark and leave Alexandria.

==== Walcheren ====
In 1809, Austria declared war on France. To provide a diversion, a British force consisting mainly of the troops recently evacuated from Corunna was dispatched to capture the Dutch ports of Flushing and Antwerp. There were numerous delays, and the Austrians had already surrendered when the army sailed. The island of Walcheren, where they landed, was pestilential and disease-ridden (mainly with malaria or "ague"). Although Flushing was captured, more than one third of the soldiers died or were incapacitated before the army was withdrawn.

==== Indian Ocean and East Indies ====
To clear nests of French privateers and raiders, the Army captured the French dependencies in the Indian Ocean in the Mauritius campaign of 1809–1811. With substantial contingents from the East India Company, British troops also captured the Dutch colonies in the Far East in 1810 with the successful Invasion of the Spice Islands and 1811, with the fall of Java.

==== Peninsular War ====
Those veterans had won nineteen pitched battles and innumerable combats; had made or sustained ten sieges and taken four great fortresses; had twice expelled the French from Portugal, once from Spain; had penetrated France, and killed wounded or captured two hundred thousand enemies — leaving of their own number forty thousand dead, whose bones whiten the plains and mountains of the Peninsula.

— Sir William Napier on the Peninsular War.

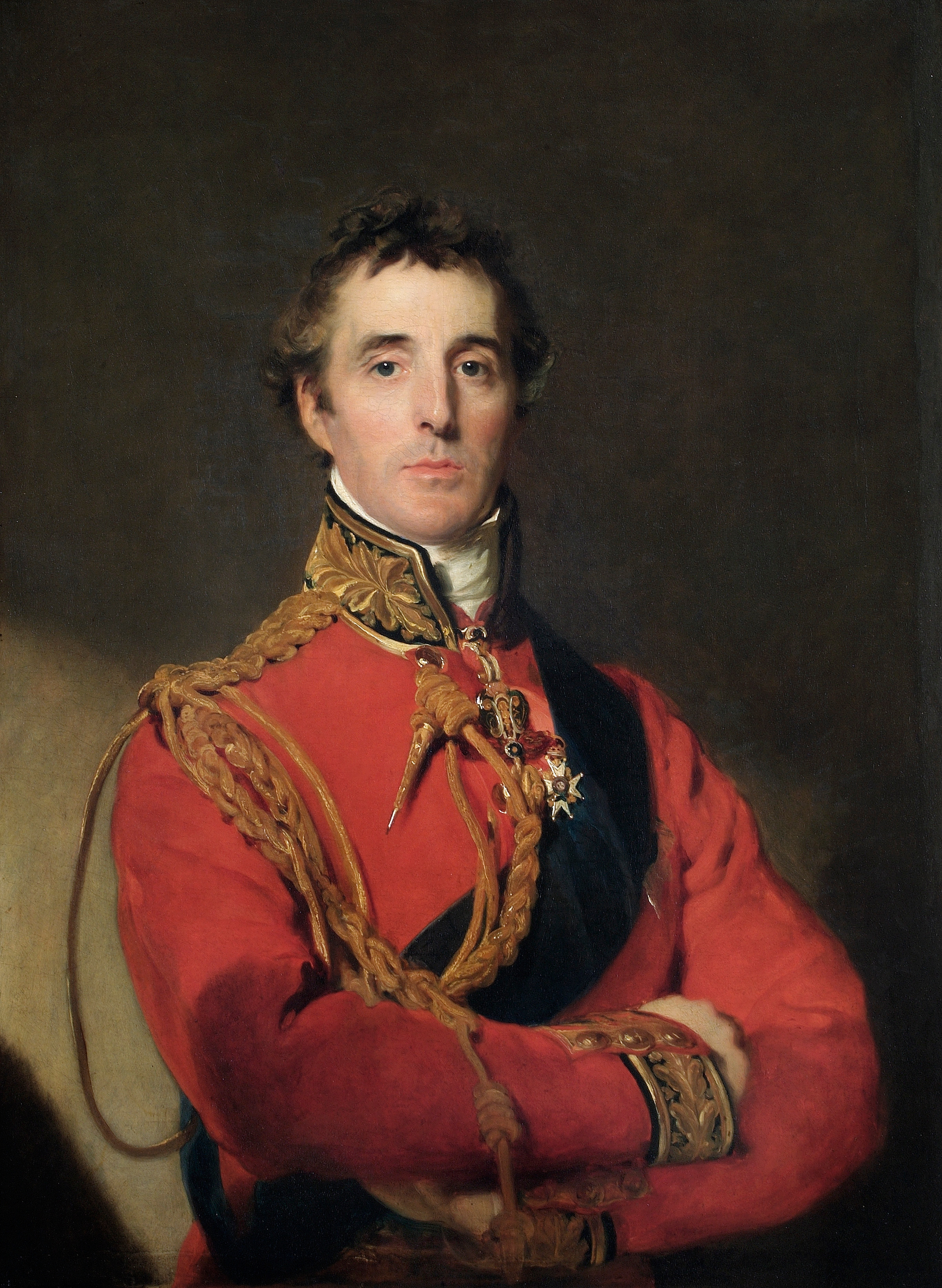
The Duke of Wellington, who commanded the army in the Peninsula from 1809 to 1814

In 1808, after Bonaparte overthrew the monarchs of Spain and Portugal, an expedition under Wellesley which was originally intended to attack the Spanish possessions in Central America was diverted to Portugal. Wellesley won the Battle of Vimeiro while reinforcements landed at nearby Maceira Bay. Wellesley was superseded in turn by two superiors, Sir Harry Burrard and Sir Hew Dalrymple, who delayed further attacks. Instead, they signed the Convention of Sintra, by which the French evacuated Portugal (with all their loot) in British ships. Although this secured the British hold on Lisbon, it resulted in the three generals' recall to England, and command of the British troops devolved on Sir John Moore.

In October, Moore led the army into Spain, reaching as far as Salamanca. In December, they were reinforced by 10,000 troops from England under Sir David Baird. Moore's army now totalled 36,000, but his advance was cut short by the news that Napoleon had defeated the Spanish and captured Madrid, and was approaching with an army of 200,000. Moore retreated to Corunna over mountain roads and through bitter winter weather. French cavalry pursued the British Army the length of the journey, and a Reserve Division was set to provide rearguard protection for the British troops, which were engaged in much fighting. About 4,000 troops separated from the main force and marched to Vigo.The French caught up with the main army at Corunna, and in the ensuing Battle of Corunna in January 1809, Moore was killed; the remnant of the army was evacuated to England. In 1809, Wellesley returned to Portugal with fresh forces, and defeated the French at the Second Battle of Porto, driving them from the country. He again advanced into Spain and fought the Battle of Talavera and the Battle of the Côa. He and the Spanish commanders were unable to cooperate, and he retreated into Portugal, where he constructed the defensive Lines of Torres Vedras which protected Lisbon, while he reorganised his Anglo-Portuguese Army into divisions, most of which had two British brigades and one Portuguese brigade. The next year, when a large French army under Marshal André Masséna invaded Portugal, Wellesley fought a delaying action at the Battle of Bussaco, before withdrawing behind the impregnable Lines, leaving Massena's army to starve in front of them. After Massena withdrew, there was fighting for most of 1811 on the frontiers of Portugal, as Wellesley attempted to recover vital fortified towns. A British and Spanish force under Beresford fought the very bloody Battle of Albuera, while Wellesley himself won the Battle of Sabugal in April, and the Battle of Fuentes de Onoro in May.

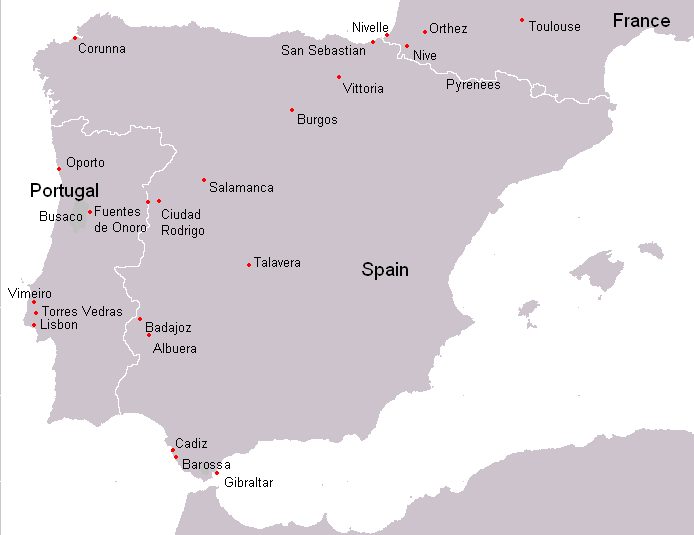
Major British battles of the Peninsular War

In January 1812, Wellesley captured Ciudad Rodrigo after a surprise move. On 6 April, he then stormed Badajoz, another strong fortress, which the British had failed to carry on an earlier occasion. There was heavy fighting with very high casualties and Wellesley ordered a withdrawal, but a diversionary attack had gained a foothold by escalade and the main attack through the breaches was renewed. The fortress was taken, at great cost (over 5000 British casualties), and for three days the army sacked and pillaged the town in undisciplined revenge. Soon after the assault on Badajoz, Wellesley (now raised to the peerage as Marquess Wellington) marched into northern Spain. For a month the British and French armies marched and counter-marched against each other around Salamanca.
On 22 July, Wellington took advantage of a momentary French dispersion and gained a complete victory at the Battle of Salamanca. After occupying Madrid, Wellington unsuccessfully besieged Burgos. In October, the army retreated to Portugal. This "Winter Retreat" bore similarities to the earlier retreat to Corunna, as it suffered from poor supplies, bitter weather and rearguard action. In spring 1813, Wellington resumed the offensive, leaving Portugal and marching northwards through Spain, dropping the lines of communication to Lisbon and establishing new ones to the Spanish ports on the Bay of Biscay. At the Battle of Vitoria the French armies were routed, disgorging an enormous quantity of loot, which caused the British troops to abandon the pursuit and break ranks to plunder. Wellington's troops subsequently defeated French attempts to relieve their remaining fortresses in Spain.
During the autumn and winter, they forced the French defensive lines in the Pyrenees and crossed into France, winning the Battle of Nivelle, the Battle of Nive and the Battle of Orthez in February 1814.In France, the discipline of Wellington's British and Portuguese troops was far superior to that of the Spanish, and even that of the French, thanks to plentiful supplies delivered by sea.

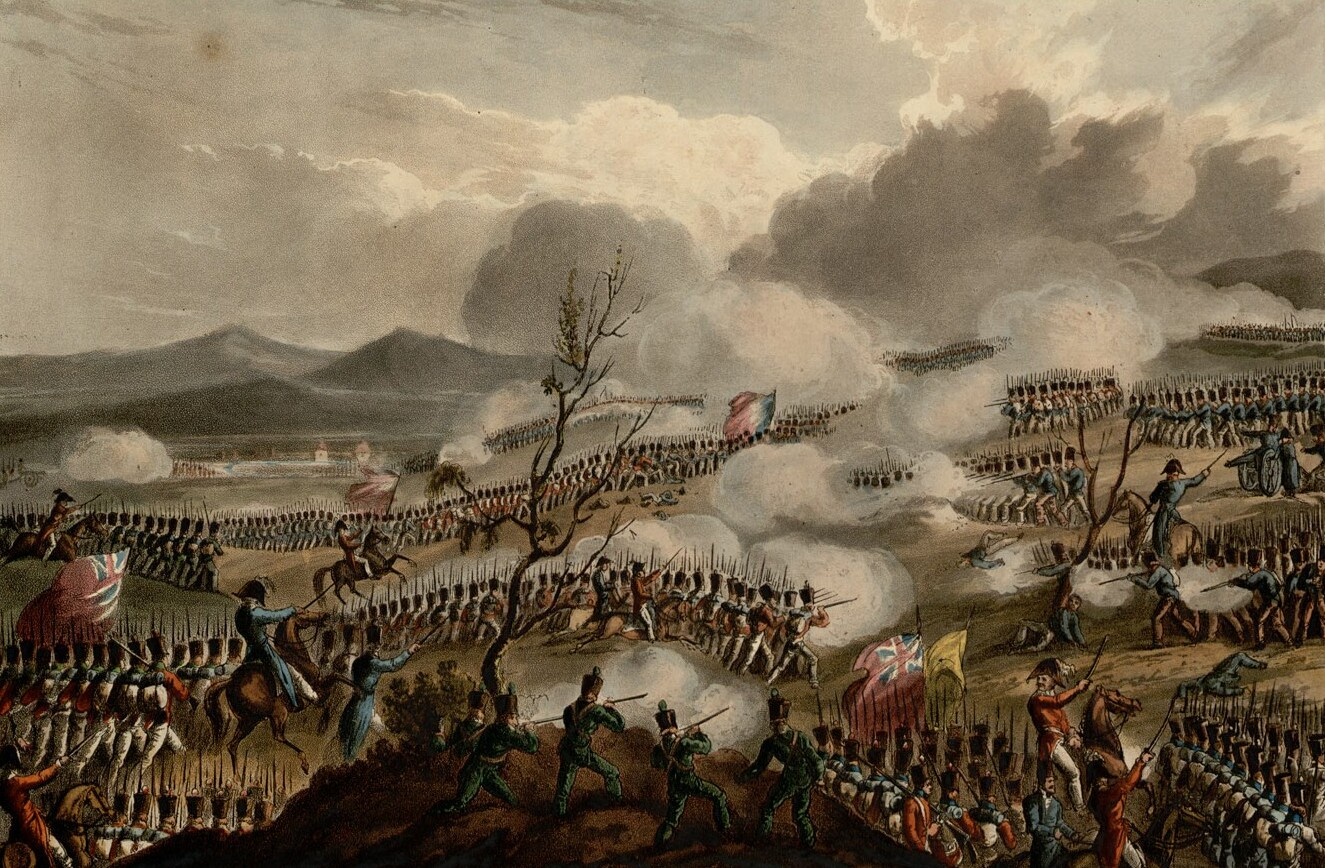
Battle of Nivelle, 1813

On 31 March 1814, allied armies entered Paris, and Napoleon abdicated on 6 AprilThe news was slow to reach Wellington, who fought the indecisive Battle of Toulouse on 10 April. Once peace agreements had finally been settled, the army left the Peninsula. The infantry marched to Bordeaux for transportation to their new postings (several to North America). Many Spanish wives and girlfriends were left behind, to general distress. The cavalry rode through France to Boulogne and Calais.

==== Holland 1814 ====
In 1814, the British government had sent a small force to Holland under Sir Thomas Graham to capture the fortress of Bergen op Zoom. The attack, on 8 March 1814, failed and the British were repelled, with heavy losses.

==== War in North America ====
Although the United States of America was not allied to France, war broke out between America and Britain ostensibly over issues of trade embargoes and impressment of American sailors into the Royal Navy, both of which were directly or indirectly linked to the Napoleonic wars (the latter of which was not even brought up during the Treaty of Ghent). For the first two years of the war, a small number of British regular units formed the hard core around which the Canadian militia rallied. Multiple US invasions north of the border were repulsed; such an example can be seen at the Battle of Crysler's Farm in which battalions of 89th and 49th Regiments attacked and routed a significantly larger American force making its way toward Montreal. In 1814, larger numbers of British regulars became available after the abdication of Napoleon. However, long and inadequate supply lines constrained the British war effort. In Chesapeake Bay, a British force captured and burned Washington, but was repulsed at Baltimore. Neither side could strike a decisive blow which would compel the other to cede favourable terms, and the Treaty of Ghent was signed. Before news of it could reach the armies on the other side of the Atlantic, a British force under Wellington's brother-in-law Sir Edward Pakenham was defeated foolhardily attacking heavily fortified positions at the Battle of New Orleans.

==== Waterloo campaign 1815 ====
Map of the Waterloo campaign

It appeared that war was finally over, and arrangements for the peace were discussed at the Congress of Vienna. But on 26 February 1815, Napoleon escaped from Elba and returned to France, where he raised an army. By 20 March he had reached Paris. The Allies assembled another army and planned for a summer offensive. Basing themselves in Belgium, the Allies formed two armies, with the Duke of Wellington commanding the Anglo-Allies, and Gebhard Leberecht von Blücher commanding the Prussians. Napoleon marched swiftly through France to meet them, and split his army to launch a two-pronged attack. On 16 June 1815, Napoleon himself led men against Blücher at Ligny, while Marshall Ney commanded an attack against Wellington's forward army at the Battle of Quatre Bras. Wellington successfully held Quatre Bras, but the Prussians were not so successful at Ligny, and were forced to retreat to Wavre. Hearing of Blücher's defeat on the morning of 17 June, Lord Wellington ordered his army to withdraw on a parallel course to his ally; the British and Belgians took position near the Belgian village of Waterloo.

On the morning of 18 June, one of the greatest ever feats of British arms began: The Battle of Waterloo. The British, Dutch, Belgian, Nassau and German troops were posted on higher ground south of Waterloo. There had been heavy rain overnight and Napoleon chose not to attack until almost midday. The delay meant that the Prussians had a chance to march towards the battle, but in the meantime, Wellington had to hold on. The French started their attack with an artillery bombardment. The first French attacks were then directed against the Chateau of Hougemont down from the main ridge. Here British and Nassau troops stubbornly defended the Hougomont buildings all day; the action eventually engaging a whole French Corps which failed to capture the Chateau. At half past one, the Anglo-Allied Army was assaulted by d'Erlon's infantry attack on the British left wing but the French were forced back with heavy losses.

Later in the afternoon, British troops were amazed to see waves of cavalrymen heading towards them. The British troops, as per standard drill, formed infantry squares (hollow box-formations four ranks deep) after which the French cavalry was driven off. The British position was critical after the fall of La Haye Sainte, but fortunately, the Prussians started entering the battlefield. As the Prussian advance guard began to arrive from the east, Napoleon sent French units to stabilise his right wing. At around seven o'clock, Napoleon ordered his Old and Middle Guard to make a final desperate assault on the by now fragile Allied line. The attack was repulsed. At that point Wellington stood up and waved his hat in the air to signal a general advance. His army rushed forward from the lines in a full assault on the retreating French. Napoleon lost the battle.

== Later history ==
Following the conclusion of the wars, the army was reduced. At this time, infantry regiments existed up to 104th Foot, but between 1817 and 1819, the regiments numbered 95th Foot up were disbanded, and by 1821 the army numbered only 101,000 combatants, 30% of which were stationed in the colonies, especially India. Over the following decades, various regiments were added, removed or reformed to respond to military or colonial needs, but it never grew particularly large again until the First World War, and the Empire became more reliant on local forces to maintain defence and order.

== See also ==
- Army of Spain (Peninsular War)
- British Volunteer Corps
- Chronology of events of the Peninsular War
- Coalition forces of the Napoleonic Wars
- Fencibles
- Grande Armée
- History of the British Army
- Militia (Great Britain)
- Militia (United Kingdom)
- National Army Museum
- Napoleonic Wars casualties
- The United Kingdom in the Napoleonic Wars
- Timeline of the British Army
- Types of military forces in the Napoleonic Wars
- List of British general officers killed in the French Revolutionary and Napoleonic Wars
- British Army awards in the Napoleonic Wars
