= George Ridout Bingham =

Major-General Sir George Ridout Bingham KCB
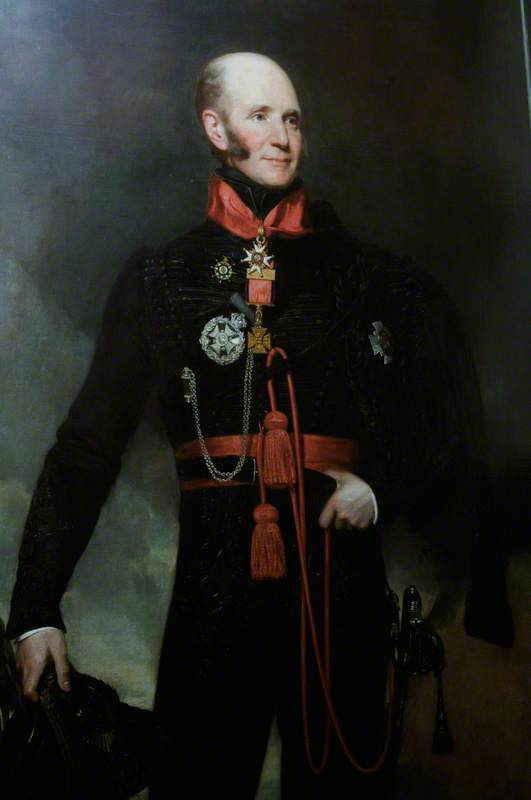
- Portrait of Bingham by Henry William Pickersgill
- Born: 21 July 1777; Melcombe Regis, Dorset
- Died: 3 January 1833 (aged 55); London
- Military career
- Allegiance: United Kingdom
- Branch: British Army
- Service years: 1793–1833
- Rank: Major-General
- Commands: 53rd Regiment of Foot; Cork District
- Conflicts: French Revolutionary Wars; Xhosa Wars; Napoleonic Wars; Peninsular War; Second Battle of Porto; Siege of Burgos; Battle of Vitoria; Battle of the Pyrenees; Battle of Nivelle
- Awards: Knight Commander of the Order of the Bath

Major-General Sir George Ridout Bingham KCB (21 July 1777 – 3 January 1833) was a British Army officer, who fought in the Napoleonic Wars.

Bingham joined the British Army and was ensign in Corsica in 1793, He served in Cape and in 1800 fought in the Xhosa War. He was promoted to major in 1801 and was lieutenant-colonel of 2nd battalion 53rd Foot in Ireland in 1805. He served in the Peninsula from 1809 until 1814. He was knighted in 1815 and promoted to brigadier-general serving as the commanding military officer on St. Helena from 1815 until 1819 during Napoleon Bonaparte's initial incarceration on the island. Bingham then returned to the United Kingdom serving on the British Army staff in Ireland. He commanded Cork district from 1827 to 1832.

== Biography ==
The son of Richard Bingham, colonel of the Dorset militia, and his second wife, Elizabeth, daughter of J. Ridout, Bingham was born in Melcombe Regis, Dorset. He entered the army in June 1793 as ensign in the 69th Foot, serving with it in Corsica and with one of the detachments embarked as marines under Admiral Hotham, in the Gulf of Genoa. Promoted to a company in the 81st Foot in 1796, he served with that regiment in the Cape Colony, and took part in the third Xhosa war of 1799 on the Sundays River. In 1801 he became major in the 82nd Foot, and was with it in Menorca until that island was finally restored to Spain at the Peace of Amiens.

In 1805 he was appointed lieutenant-colonel of the newly raised 2nd battalion 53rd Foot in Ireland, and, proceeding with it to Portugal four years later, fought at its head throughout its distinguished Peninsular career, beginning with the expulsion of the French from Porto in 1809, and ending with the close of the Burgos retreat in 1812. The battalion being then reduced to a skeleton, and having no home battalion to relieve or reinforce it (the 1st battalion was in India), was sent home, but four companies were left in Portugal, and these, with four companies of 2nd Queen's similarly circumstanced, were formed into a provisional battalion which, under the command of Colonel Bingham, performed gallant service in the subsequent campaigns in Spain and the south of France, including the victories at Vitoria, in the Pyrenees, and on the Nivelle.

When it was decided to consign Napoleon to St. Helena, Colonel (now Sir George) Bingham was senior officer of the troops sent there, and continued to serve on the island with the rank of brigadier-general, as second in command under Sir Hudson Lowe, until 1819, when he returned home on promotion. Sir George was afterwards on the Irish staff, and commanded the Cork district from 1827 to 1832, a most distracted period, when the discord fomented by the Catholic emancipation debates was aggravated by agrarian crime, famine, and latterly by pestilence. In Ireland, as at St. Helena, Sir George Bingham's fine tact and kindliness of disposition appear to have won general esteem. He is described as having been a thorough gentleman as well as a brilliant soldier. He died in London on 3 January 1833.

== Notes ==
Military offices
Preceded by Sir Thomas Sydney Beckwith	Colonel-Commandant of the 2nd Battalion, Rifle Brigade; 1831–1833	Succeeded by Sir James Stevenson Barns
