= John Charles Beckwith (British Army officer) =

British army officer (1789–1862)

Major-General John Charles Beckwith
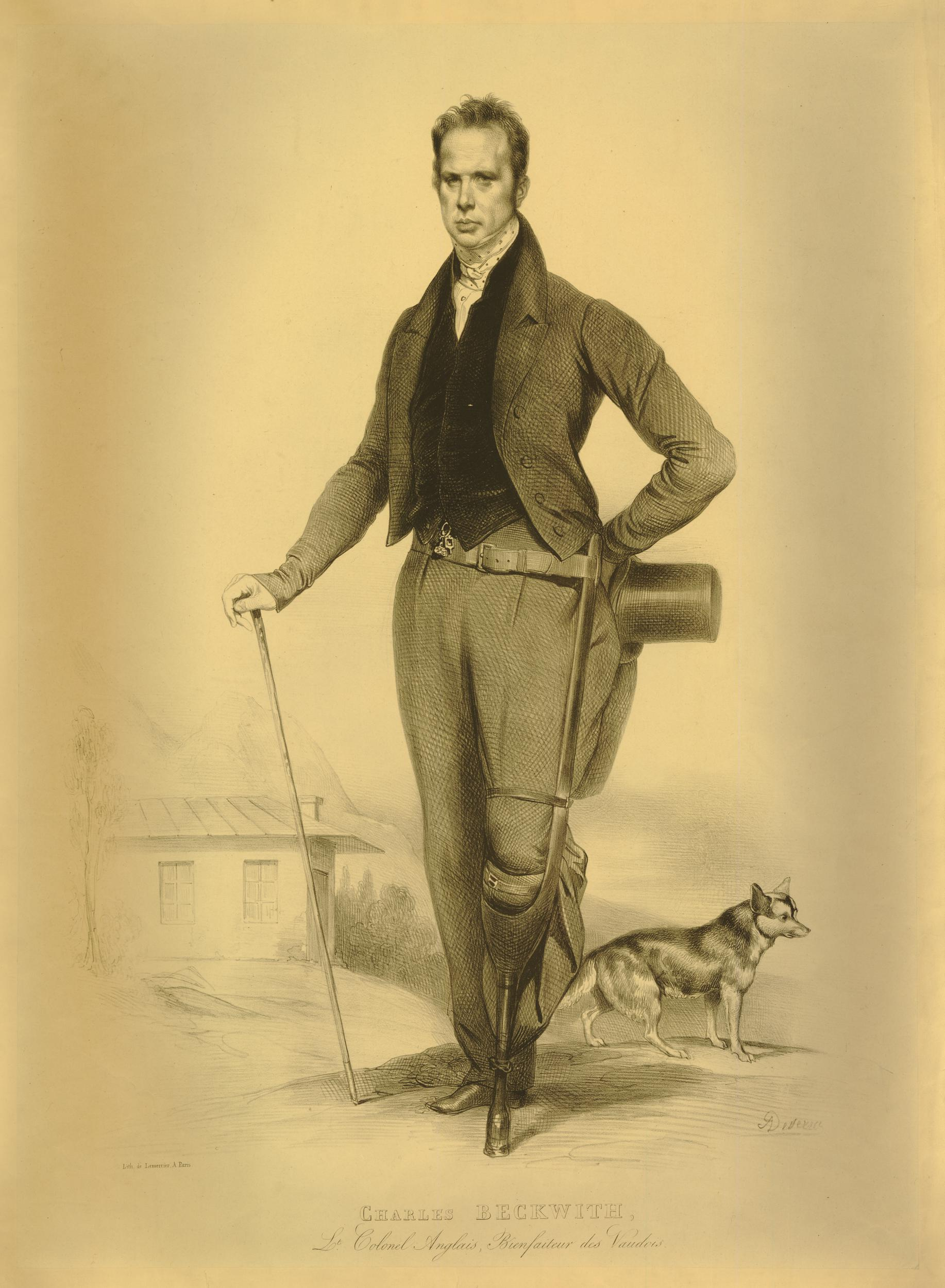
- Portrait of Charles Beckwith 1830s (c.)
- Born: 1789; Nova Scotia
- Died: 19 July 1862 (aged 72–73); Torre Pellice, Waldensian Valleys

John Charles Beckwith (1789–1862) was a British army officer who was born in Nova Scotia. He is best remembered for being injured in the Battle of Waterloo and for his charity work and philanthropy among the Waldensians of northern Italy.

== Career ==
John Charles Beckwith, known as Charles Beckwith, was born in Halifax, Nova Scotia and was the eldest of ten children. He was the grandson of Major-General John Beckwith and nephew of the generals, Sir George Beckwith and Sir Thomas Sydney Beckwith. He attended the Halifax Grammar School with Captain Herbert Clifford.

He left Halifax to join the British army at age 14. Charles Beckwith joined the 50th Regiment of Foot in 1803, exchanging in 1804 into the 95th Rifles, with which regiment he served in the Peninsular campaigns of 1808–10.

He was subsequently employed on the staff of the Light Division, and he was repeatedly mentioned in despatches, becoming in 1814 a brevet-major, and after the Battle of Waterloo lieutenant-colonel and C.B. He had four horses shot from under him at the Battle of Waterloo before he lost a leg. Soon afterwards, he became an active reformed Christian but remained a member of the Church of England throughout his life.

A fellow passenger noted of Beckwith on a voyage to France:

"Major Beckwith was a fine, gentlemanly young high-spirited fellow, the exact prototype of a rifleman. His unwearied flow of spirits kept us in good humour during two days and nights in a dead calm, in the middle of the Bay of Biscay; when the sails and ropes flapped against the masts; and the vessel rocked from stem to stern incessantly."

In 1820, he left active military service. Seven years later, whilst in the library of Apsley House in London, waiting to see the Duke of Wellington, he picked up a book by Prebendary of Durham, William Stephen Gilly about the history of the Protestant Waldensians, also known as the Vaudois, who lived in the Cottian Alps, in north-west Italy. The Waldensians had, through skilled military means employed in a few defensible Alpine valleys, maintained their Reformation-type doctrines and championed the principle of freedom of religion since the 14th century in the face of many Papal, Savoyard and French efforts to eradicate them by violence and repression.

Having discovered the Waldensian Evangelical Church and Waldensian history and their social marginalisation, causing poverty and ignorance, Charles Beckwith consecrated the rest of this life to serve the Waldensians and their faith, both before 1848 when their religious and civil rights were recognised in a new Piedmontese constitution and until he died in 1862, in Val Pellice.

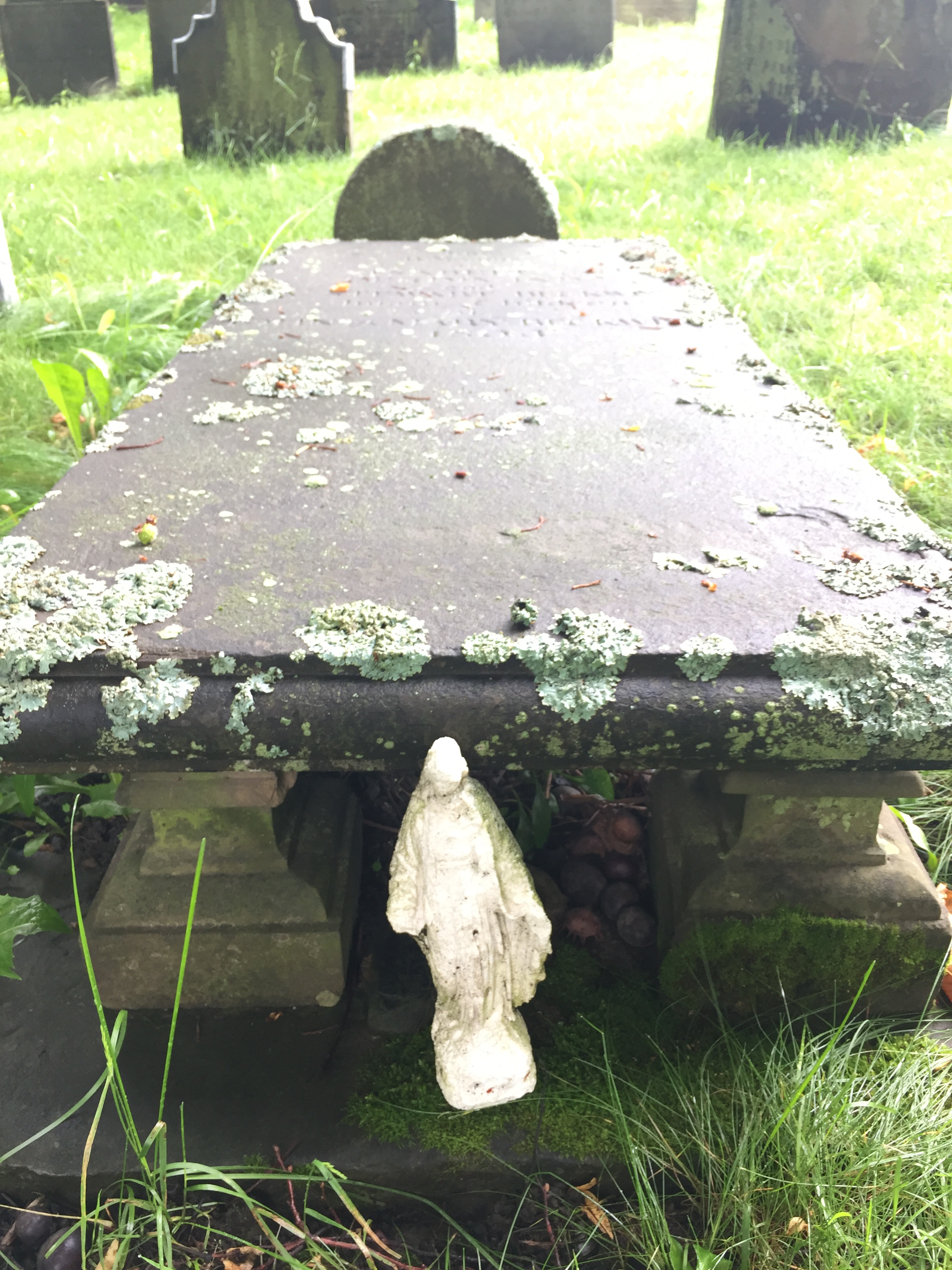
John Charles Beckwith's siblings, Old Burying Ground

Charles Beckwith made his home in their main town Torre Pellice. He then used his fortune and overseas contacts to help build 120 schools in the Waldensian valleys, a Waldensian hospital, an elegant church and Waldensian headquarters in Torre Pellice in what is still known as 'the English Quarter'. He worked to strengthen the Waldensian education system and rebuild their ancient missionary zeal to carry the Waldensian faith across Italy. He built the Waldensian Church in Turin and represented them before the Dukes of Savoy in Turin. He was widely regarded as 'a father' to these people and he married a Waldensian believer from the valleys in 1850. A book, published in Italian in 2012, entitled "The General of the Valdesi" (Waldensians) along with the Waldensian church buildings which still distinguish Torre Pellice reflect the impact that Charles Beckwith had throughout these valleys.

He was promoted to colonel in the British army in 1837 and major-general in 1846. In 1848, King Charles Albert made him a knight of the Order of Saints Maurice and Lazarus.

Charles Beckwith died on 19 July 1862 at his home in Torre Pellice and is buried in Luserna San Giovanni Val Pellice part of the Waldensian valleys.

== See also ==
- Luserna San Giovanni
