= Richard Williams (Royal Marines officer) =

British officer of the Royal Marines

Colonel Commandant Sir Richard Williams KCB (1764–1839) was a career British officer of the Royal Marines active during the American Revolutionary War, the French Revolutionary Wars, the Napoleonic Wars, and the War of 1812.

Sir Richard Williams is notable for being the first commanding officer of the Royal Marine Artillery, and for subsequently commanding the Portsmouth Division of Royal Marines from 1827 to 1835.

In American history he is remembered as the senior ranking officer of the Royal Marines to serve on the British North America and West Indies Station during the War of 1812.

Historian Paul Harris Nicolas (1790–1860), himself a former Royal Marine officer and the author of the two-volume Historical Record of the Marine Forces (1845), paid tribute to Williams' firm hand in controlling the conduct of his troops on foreign soil. Williams would not condone looting on the part of those under his command.

== Company officer ==
Williams joined the Marines in 1778 at the age of 14 as a second lieutenant. He was the older brother of Samuel Williams (1766–1824), who also served with distinction in the Royal Marines. Both Richard and Samuel Williams were the sons of Brevet Lieutenant Colonel (and Major) Bartholomew Williams (died 1797) of H. M. Marine Forces.

In the course of the American Revolutionary War, which involved Great Britain in war against France, Spain, and the Dutch Republic, Richard Williams served at sea, and was promoted to first lieutenant in the Marines in 1781. On 6 July 1782, while serving aboard HMS Sultan, Williams was wounded in the naval Battle of Negapatam (1782)between British and French fleets off the southeastern coast of India.

Following the end of the American War of Independence, the establishment of the Marines was reduced, and he was on half-pay for several years. In spite of this unattached status on half-pay, the young lieutenant remained abroad on foreign service until 27 May 1785.

During the French Revolutionary wars, Williams served aboard HMS Arethusa in the Channel Squadron commanded by Commodore Sir John Borlase Warren, 1st Baronet, and participated in the naval Action of 23 April 1794 near Guernsey in which the squadron captured three French warships.

Ordered ashore, Richard Williams was assigned to 35 Company, and was duly assigned to 126 Company upon his promotion to captain. Both of these companies were in the Establishment of the Portsmouth Division of the corps of Marines.

As captain of Marines aboard HMS Robust, which was commanded by Captain Edward Thornbrough of the Royal Navy, Williams vainly sought permission to intervene promptly with his Marines against the mutineers at the Spithead anchorage. The Marine captain was subsequently among the officers sent ashore by the mutineers of the Spithead and Nore mutinies. Recognition for his loyalty and determination brought about his restoration to duty by the Admiralty.

Still captain of the Marines aboard HMS Robust, Williams took part in the Battle of Tory Island on 12 October 1798.

== First commanding officer of the Royal Marine Artillery ==
When the Royal Marine Artillery was formed on 1 September 1804, he was chosen to be the officer commanding, a role that he initially carried out until 1810, and again accomplished from 1816 until 1827.

== Battalion command in the Napoleonic Wars ==
As an experienced and competent major with a thorough knowledge of artillery, he was appointed to set up, and command, a standing battalion of Royal Marines for foreign service. At the time, it was standard practice for Marines to be allocated to ships, on a quota determined by the rating of the ship. It was rarely the case that a body of Marines would be greater than 200 other ranks. (Manpower shortages in the Royal Marines had necessitated the use of line infantry to remedy these shortages). One other radical approach was to employ a company of Royal Marine Artillery attached to this battalion. This battalion deployed to Lisbon, and subsequently to Northern Spain for the second half of 1812.

In the course of the Peninsular War, Williams gained the attention of his army seniors for the discipline and efficiency of his Marines. The Royal Marines Battalions (Napoleonic Wars) participated in a number of actions in the Peninsular War, and Williams found himself in command of British Army brigades on more than one occasion.

Upon returning from Spain, Williams was appointed a brevet lieutenant colonel, to avoid any subsequent issues with seniority when dealing with army field officers. He and Major James Malcolm were sent, with their respective battalions, to North America to participate in the War of 1812.

Although Williams's battalion was ordered in August 1814 to be 'disposed for Naval service' and dispersed among the flotillas at Lake Ontario and Lake Champlain, the war did not finish for him. There was a third Royal Marine battalion which had arrived in July, and Williams – having seniority among the Marine field officers – became its new commanding officer. He was present in the Chesapeake campaign, participating in the Battle of Bladensburg, the attack on Washington, and the Battle of Baltimore. The men of his original battalion were redeployed, along with his new unit, to Tangier Island, on the understanding they would be spending the winter on the island.

Williams had planned to lead an expedition into Georgia in the spring of 1815, but the war had ended, and he returned to the UK. He was awarded the KCB on 25 May 1815 for his actions in the War of 1812. The battalion was disbanded, and he undertook a new command as commandant-major of the expanded Royal Marine Artillery on 1 January 1816.

== Peacetime field officer ==
Williams remained at this post until 1827, when he became colonel commandant of the Portsmouth Division of Royal Marines, a position he held for the rest of his active career in the Marines.

Promotion was slow in the Royal Marines, slower than in the other service branches. Williams, a substantive major in 1815, waited until 1821 for advancement to the rank of lieutenant colonel in the Royal Marines, and another six years passed before his promotion to colonel commandant of the Portsmouth Division, late in 1827. In 1828, at Portsmouth, he married Amy (Bowles) Bingham (1769–1859), the second wife and widow of a British poet, the Reverend Peregrine Bingham (1756–1826.)

In April 1838 he was appointed to be a commissioner for inquiring into the several modes of promotion, along with several other retired senior officers, including the Duke of Wellington.

== Military promotions and distinctions ==
- Second lieutenant H.M. Marine Forces, appointed on 26 August 1778
- First lieutenant H.M. Marine Forces 17 February 1781

On half-pay of the reduced establishment of the corps 1 September 1783
Reappointed to full pay on 2 March 1787

- Captain lieutenant H.M. Marine Forces 14 May 1795
- Captain H.M. Marine Forces 27 January 1796
  - Senior officer of the Establishment of Royal Marine Artillery (RMA), upon its formation in 1804.
  - Brevet major (Army List) 25 April 1808
- Major Royal Marines 15 February 1809
  - Brevet lieutenant colonel (Army List) 21 January 1813
  - KCB 2 January 1815
  - Major commandant Royal Marine Artillery (RMA) 1 January 1816
- Lieutenant colonel commandant Royal Marine Artillery (RMA) with the substantive rank of lieutenant colonel in the Royal Marines 19 July 1821
- Colonel commandant (Portsmouth Division) Royal Marines 20 December 1827

Allowed to retire from the Royal Marines in July 1835, with full pay, after more than 50 years of active service as a commissioned officer in the Marine Forces.

== Personal life ==
Williams was the son of Brevet Lieutenant Colonel and Captain Bartholomew Williams (died 1797), of his Majesty's Marine Forces, and the former Miss Anne Miller, who were married in 1756. "Colonel" Bartholomew Williams, the father of the future colonel commandant, was a 40-year veteran of his Majesty's Marine Forces, figuring on the 1767 Army List as a first lieutenant of Marines on half pay, and on the Army Lists of 1778 and 1783 as a captain of Marines since November 1776. His promotion, on the Army List, to the brevet (army) rank of major was reported in the December 1790 issue of "The Scots magazine".

Williams married late in life. In August 1828 he was united in marriage with Mrs Amy (Bowles) Bingham (1769–1859), at Southampton, Hampshire. Amy was the widow of the Reverend Peregrine Bingham (1756–1826) who is mentioned above.

"Colonel Sir Richard Williams, K.C.B. of the Royal Marines, late commandant of the Portsmouth Division of the Royal Marines", died in Hampshire on 21 June 1839
