= Thomas Sydney Beckwith =

British Army officer (1770–1831)

Lieutenant-General Sir Thomas Sydney Beckwith KCB
- Born: 17 February 1770; Ford, Northumberland, England
- Died: 15 January 1831 (aged 61); Mahabaleshwar, Bombay, British India
- Spouse: Lady Mary Douglas (m. 1817)
- Military career
- Allegiance: United Kingdom
- Branch: British Army
- Rank: Lieutenant-General
- Commands: Bombay Army
- Conflicts: War of 1812
- Awards: Knight Commander of the Order of the Bath

Lieutenant-General Sir Thomas Sydney Beckwith KCB (17 February 1770 – 15 January 1831) was a British Army officer who served as quartermaster general of the British forces in Canada during the War of 1812, and a commander-in-chief of the Bombay Army during the British Raj. He is most notable for his distinguished service during the Peninsular War and for his contributions to the development and command of the 95th Rifles.

== Family ==
His father was Major General John Beckwith, who commanded the 20th Regiment of Foot. His brothers were Captain John Beckwith, Sir George Beckwith and Brigadier General Ferdinand Beckwith. He was also the uncle of Major-General John Charles Beckwith. He entered the Army himself in 1791, joining the 71st (Highland) Regiment of Foot, and served with them in India.

In 1817, he married Lady Mary Douglas, eldest daughter of Sir William Douglas, 4th Baronet of Kelhead. His wife, whose brothers Charles and John succeeded as Marquess of Queensberry, was elevated to the rank of a daughter of a marquess by royal warrant. Their only son, Thomas Sydney Beckwith, was a captain in the Rifle Brigade, and died in Gibraltar on 21 March 1828.

== Service with the 95th Rifles ==
In 1800, he was appointed to command a company in Colonel Coote Manningham's "Experimental Corps of Riflemen", which later was designated the 95th Regiment and subsequently the Rifle Brigade. He was promoted to major within the corps in 1802. The next year, he was promoted to lieutenant colonel and took command of the 1st Battalion. Beckwith was one of the favourite officers of Sir John Moore in the famous camp of Shorncliffe, and aided that general in the training of the troops which afterwards became the Light Division.

He served on the expeditions to Hanover in 1806 and Copenhagen in 1807, before joining the expedition to the Peninsula under Major General Arthur Wellesley. He took part in the Battle of Vimeiro, and the expedition into Spain under Sir John Moore, in which the Rifles bore the brunt of the rearguard fighting.

The next year, he returned to Portugal and was appointed to command the 1st Brigade of the Light Division. Beckwith took part in Craufurd's great march to the field of Talavera. In 1810, during the French invasion of Portugal, he was present at the Battle of the Coa and the Battle of Busaco. During the subsequent operations to drive the French from Portugal, he fought at the Battle of Fuentes de Onoro, and distinguished himself at the Battle of Sabugal.

== Quartermaster General ==
In 1812, he was appointed Assistant Quartermaster General to the British forces in North America. As such, he went to Bermuda to command a force that he divided into two brigades, one composed of the 102nd Regiment of Foot (which had 'til then been stationed at St. George's Garrison as part of the Bermuda Garrison), Royal Marines, and a company of Independent Foreigners recruited from French prisoners-of-war, was under the command of the commanding officer of the 102nd Regiment, Lieutenant-Colonel Charles James Napier (who was also his second-in-command), and the other under Lieutenant-Colonel Williams of the Royal Marines.

Beckwith went in command of this force to Chesapeake Bay in 1813. At the Battle of Craney Island, Beckwith's troops, 700 Royal Marines and soldiers of the 102nd Regiment of Foot along with a company of Independent Companies of Foreigners, came ashore at Hoffler's Creek near the mouth of the Nansemond River to the west of Craney Island on the morning of June 22, 1813, and were repulsed by shore batteries while attempting to land. He subsequently captured Hampton, Virginia where the Independent Companies of Foreigners committed numerous atrocities, motivated in part by anger over suffering a perceived massacre at the hands of American forces.

In 1814, he was promoted to major general and appointed quartermaster general to the troops in Canada under Sir George Prevost. Prevost's expedition into New York was defeated at the Battle of Plattsburgh. The Peninsular veterans in the force considered that Prevost and his staff (including Beckwith) were at least partly responsible for the defeat (in Beckwith's case, for failure to provide sufficient intelligence on the geography and enemy dispositions).

Beckwith was made a Knight Bachelor in 1812 and a Knight Commander of the Order of the Bath in 1815. In 1827, he was made colonel commandant of his old corps, the Rifle Brigade.

== Later service in India ==
In 1829, he was appointed commander in chief of the Bombay Army. In 1830, he was promoted lieutenant general, but died of fever the following year at Mahableshwar.

== Legacy ==
- Beckwith Township in Ontario, Canada, is named after him.
- Sydney Point, Panchgani: A views point in the hill station of Panchgani, Maharashtra is named after him

== See also ==
- Baker rifle
- History of British light infantry
- British Army during the Napoleonic Wars

== Bibliography ==
- "Thomas Sydney Beckwith". Dictionary of Canadian Biography (online ed.). University of Toronto Press. 1979–2016.
- Chisholm, Hugh, ed. (1911). "Beckwith, Sir Thomas Sydney" . Encyclopædia Britannica. Vol. 3 (11th ed.). Cambridge University Press. pp. 610–611.
- Stephens, Henry Morse (1885). "Beckwith, Thomas Sydney" . In Stephen, Leslie (ed.). Dictionary of National Biography. Vol. 4. London: Smith, Elder & Co.

Military offices
Preceded by Sir Andrew Barnard	Colonel-Commandant of the 2nd Battalion, Rifle Brigade; 1827–1831	Succeeded by Sir George Ridout Bingham
Preceded by Sir Thomas Bradford	C-in-C, Bombay Army; 1829–1832	Succeeded by Sir Colin Halkett
Political offices
Preceded by Sir John Malcolm	Governor of Bombay; 1830–1831	Succeeded by John Romer
