= George Beckwith (British Army officer) =

British Army officer and colonial administrator (1753–1823)

General The Right Honourable Sir George Beckwith GCB
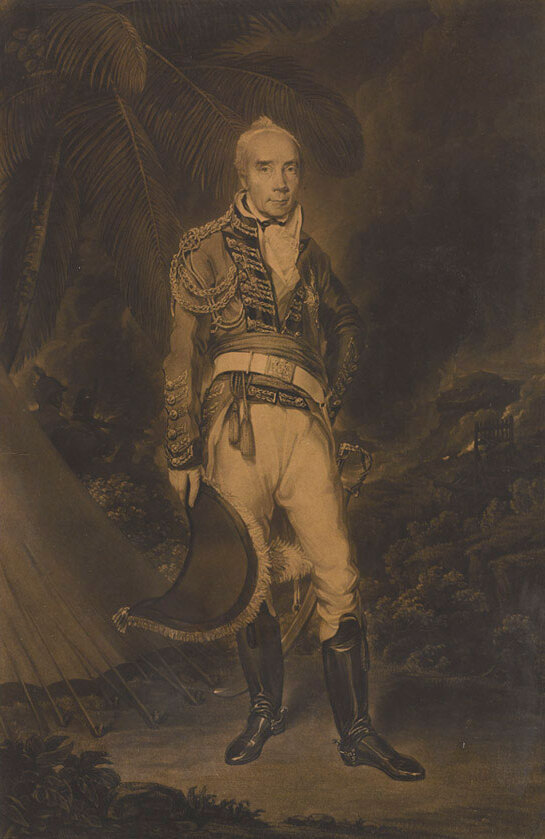
- 1814 portrait
- Born: 1753
- Died: 20 March 1823 (aged 69–70)
- Military career
- Allegiance: Great Britain; United Kingdom
- Branch: British Army
- Service years: 1771–1823
- Rank: General
- Commands: Ireland
- Conflicts: American Revolutionary War; Napoleonic Wars
- Awards: Knight of the Order of the Bath

General Sir George Beckwith, GCB (1753 – 20 March 1823) was a British Army officer and colonial administrator who served as the governor of Barbados from 1810 to 1815.

== Military career ==
Beckwith was commissioned into the 37th Regiment of Foot in 1771. He distinguished himself as a regimental officer in the American Revolutionary War, where he was assistant to Major Oliver Delancey responsible for British intelligence. In July 1782, he replaced Delancey and after the war he worked for Sir Guy Carleton in Canada. His efforts were aimed at stirring up trouble in Vermont, Florida, Kentucky and Tennessee. At the time Britain thought the weak American government might ask for British help.

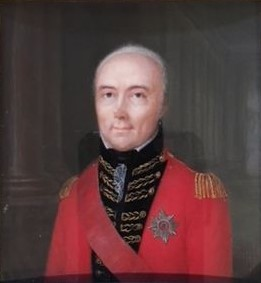
Portrait of Beckwith painted in Fort-de-France, 1809 by French artist Charlotte Martner after the capture of Martinique.

He was then appointed Governor and Commander-in-Chief of Bermuda in 1797, when a colonel. His baggage and furniture left England on 23 September 1797, aboard the Caledonia, travelling in a convoy bound for Halifax, Nova Scotia, but was lost when the Caledonia was captured by the French. Beckwith was to follow aboard a Royal Navy frigate and so escaped the fate of his baggage. He arrived in Bermuda in February 1798. Beckwith was later appointed Governor of Saint Vincent in 1806 and Governor of Barbados in 1810.

On 1 May 1809, he was made a Knight of the Order of the Bath (later apparently elevated to Knight Grand Cross of the Order of the Bath) for his Capture of Martinique in 1809 and also led a successful expedition against Guadeloupe, the last French possession in the area, in 1810. He attained the full rank of general in 1814. Sir George Beckwith was Commander-in-Chief, Ireland from 1816 to 1820. He died in London on 20 March 1823.

== Family ==
His father was Major General John Beckwith, who commanded the 20th Regiment of Foot. His brothers were Captain John Beckwith, Thomas Sydney Beckwith and Brigadier General Ferdinand Beckwith. He was also the uncle of Major-General John Charles Beckwith.

Government offices
Preceded by Henry Tucker	Governor of Bermuda; 1798–1803	Succeeded by Henry Tucker
Preceded by Henry William Bentinck	Governor of Saint Vincent; 1806–1808	Succeeded by Charles Brisbane
Preceded by John Spooner acting	Governor of Barbados; 1810–1815	Succeeded by James Leith
Military offices
Preceded by Henry Bowyer	Commander-in-Chief Windward and Leeward Islands; 1808–1814	Succeeded by Sir James Leith
Preceded by Sir Brent Spencer	Colonel of the 2nd West India Regiment; 1809–1818	Succeeded by Henry Torrens
Preceded by Sir George Hewett	Commander-in-Chief, Ireland; 1816–1820	Succeeded by Sir David Baird
Preceded by The Earl of Lindsey	Colonel of the 89th Regiment of Foot; 1818–1823	Succeeded by Sir Robert Henry MacFarlane
