= James Malcolm (Royal Marines officer) =

Sir James Malcolm
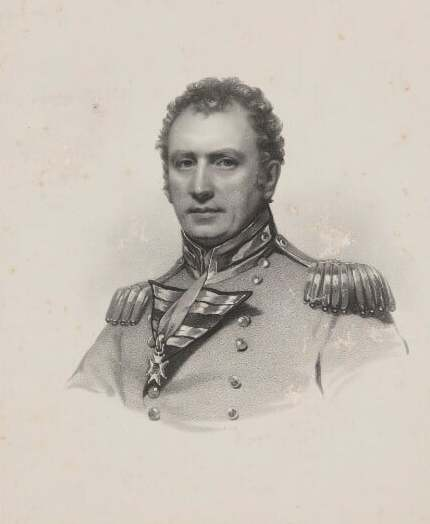
- Born: 13 January 1767; Dumfriesshire, Scotland
- Died: 27 December 1849 (aged 82); Milnholm, Dumfriesshire, Scotland
- Military career
- Allegiance: Great Britain; United Kingdom
- Branch: Royal Marines
- Service years: 1779–1827
- Rank: Lieutenant colonel
- Commands: 2nd Royal Marine Battalion
- Conflicts: American Revolutionary War; Great Siege of Gibraltar; Battle of Cape Spartel; Napoleonic Wars; Battle of San Domingo; War of 1812; Battle of Fort Oswego; Battle of Bladensburg; Burning of Washington; Battle of Baltimore

Lieutenant-Colonel Sir James Malcolm, KCB (13 January 1767 – 27 December 1849) was a Royal Marines officer who served in the American Revolutionary War, Napoleonic Wars and War of 1812.

== Early life and background ==
James Malcolm was born in Dumfriesshire, Scotland, on 13 January 1767, and died in Milnholm, Dumfriesshire, Scotland, on 27 December 1849. James was the second son of George Malcolm of Burnfoot, and his wife, the former Margaret Paisley. James was thus the older brother of Admiral Sir Pulteney Malcolm RN; Major-General Sir John Malcolm, Madras Army; and Vice Admiral Sir Charles Malcolm, RN. The boys' maternal uncle was Admiral Sir Thomas Pasley, 1st Baronet.

== Royal Marine officer ==
Malcolm was commissioned in what would later become known as the Royal Marines in 1779 at the age of twelve. During the American Revolutionary War he was assigned to the Channel Fleet. In October, 1782, the fifteen-year-old Marine Lieutenant participated in Howe's final relief of the British forces in the Great Siege of Gibraltar, and the subsequent Battle of Cape Spartel, under the orders of Admiral Lord Richard Howe, 1st Earl Howe. Royal Marine Captain James Malcolm fought at sea under the command of Vice Admiral Sir John Duckworth, 1st Baronet in the Battle of San Domingo. In the course of the fighting, in which Royal Marines played an important role, all of the enemy's ships of the line were either captured or destroyed. For his valour in that action, Captain Malcolm was brevetted a Major on the Army List with seniority in that grade dating 6 February 1806.

== Seaborne, shore, and amphibious operations ==
In July 1812 Brevet Major Malcolm was named to command the 2nd of the two Royal Marines Battalions which were then in service. He led the battalion in Spain until January 1813. In the spring of 1813 he sailed with his command to the North American and West Indies Station. Participating in operations on the Chesapeake in the summer of 1813, he was rewarded by a second brevet promotion, this time to Lieutenant Colonel, on the British Army List.

In October 1813 he accompanied his battalion to Canada. Together with a 200-man detachment of the Canadian Fencibles, the Marines formed a corps of observation and reconnaissance watching the American forces under Major General James Wilkinson.

In May 1814, Malcolm's 2nd battalion of Royal Marines served together with a mixed British expeditionary force of veteran Scotsmen, Swiss, Canadian militiamen, and armed sailors, which probed American outposts on Lake Ontario in the Battle of Fort Oswego. Malcolm's Royal Marines battalion made up about half of the actual landing force under the command of Lieutenant Colonel Karl Victor Fischer (1766–1821) of the De Watteville regiment, (a veteran Swiss regiment in British pay), which assaulted and carried the American positions. Both Fischer and Malcolm were praised for their active role in the action.

Lieutenant Colonel Malcolm commanded another battalion on the Chesapeake in the Battle of Bladensburg; the burning of Washington; and the Battle of Baltimore. Malcolm and his Marines continued to operate on the Atlantic coast, as far south as Georgia's Sea Islands and Spanish Florida, until the peace was established in May 1815. In addition to the brevet promotions on the Army List, Sir James Malcolm was knighted in 1815 as a Knight Commander of the Bath (KCB) for his valour and merit on the North American Station.

== Later career and retirement ==
Brevet Lieutenant Colonel Sir James Malcolm continued to serve in the peace establishment until 1827. He advanced to the substantive rank of Major in the Royal Marines in 1821. In 1826 he was confirmed in the substantive rank of Lieutenant Colonel of the Corps of Royal Marines.

Sir James then retired to Dumfriesshire, Scotland, where he figured among members of his household on the 1841 Scotland Census.

== Military promotions and distinctions ==
- Second Lieutenant, H.M. Marine Forces, appointed on 29 November 1779.
- First Lieutenant, H.M. Marine Forces 18 April 1793.
- Captain Lieutenant, H.M. Marine Forces 1796.
- Captain, H.M. Marine Forces 1 January 1797.

Note: H.M. Marine Forces redesignated as Royal Marines 29 April 1802.

  - Brevet Major (Army List), 6 February 1806.
  - Brevet Lieutenant Colonel (Army List), 4 June 1813.
- KCB 2 January 1815.
- Major, Royal Marines 19 July 1821.
- Lieutenant-Colonel, Royal Marines 19 July 1826.

Sir James Malcolm disposed of his commission and left the Royal Marines on 6 November 1827. He was allowed to retain his rank and his name was carried (in italics) on the annual British Army Lists from 1828 until 1850, (the year following his death,) as a lieutenant colonel with seniority dating from June 1813.

Together which such names as Sir Richard Williams, George Lewis, Sir Edward Nicolls, John Robyns, and Thomas Benjamin Adair, Sir James Malcolm figures prominently in the second volume of the still authoritative history of the British Royal Marines, Paul Harris Nicolas's Historical Record of the Royal Marine Forces in two volumes (London, 1845).

== Portrait ==
Lieutenant-Colonel Sir James Malcolm (1767–1849) of the Royal Marines sat for a portrait by the Scottish artist Sir Henry Raeburn which was painted between 1813 and 1823 and can now be found in the collection of the Huntington Museum of Art in Huntington, West Virginia. The mid 19th century lithograph was donated to the Reference Collection of the National Portrait Gallery in 1985 by Mrs Carey.

== See also ==
- Marine (military)
- Royal Marines Museum
- History of the Royal Marines
- Corps of Colonial Marines
- Battle of Fort Peter
