= Battle of Bladensburg =

1814 battle of the War of 1812

- Part of the Chesapeake campaign
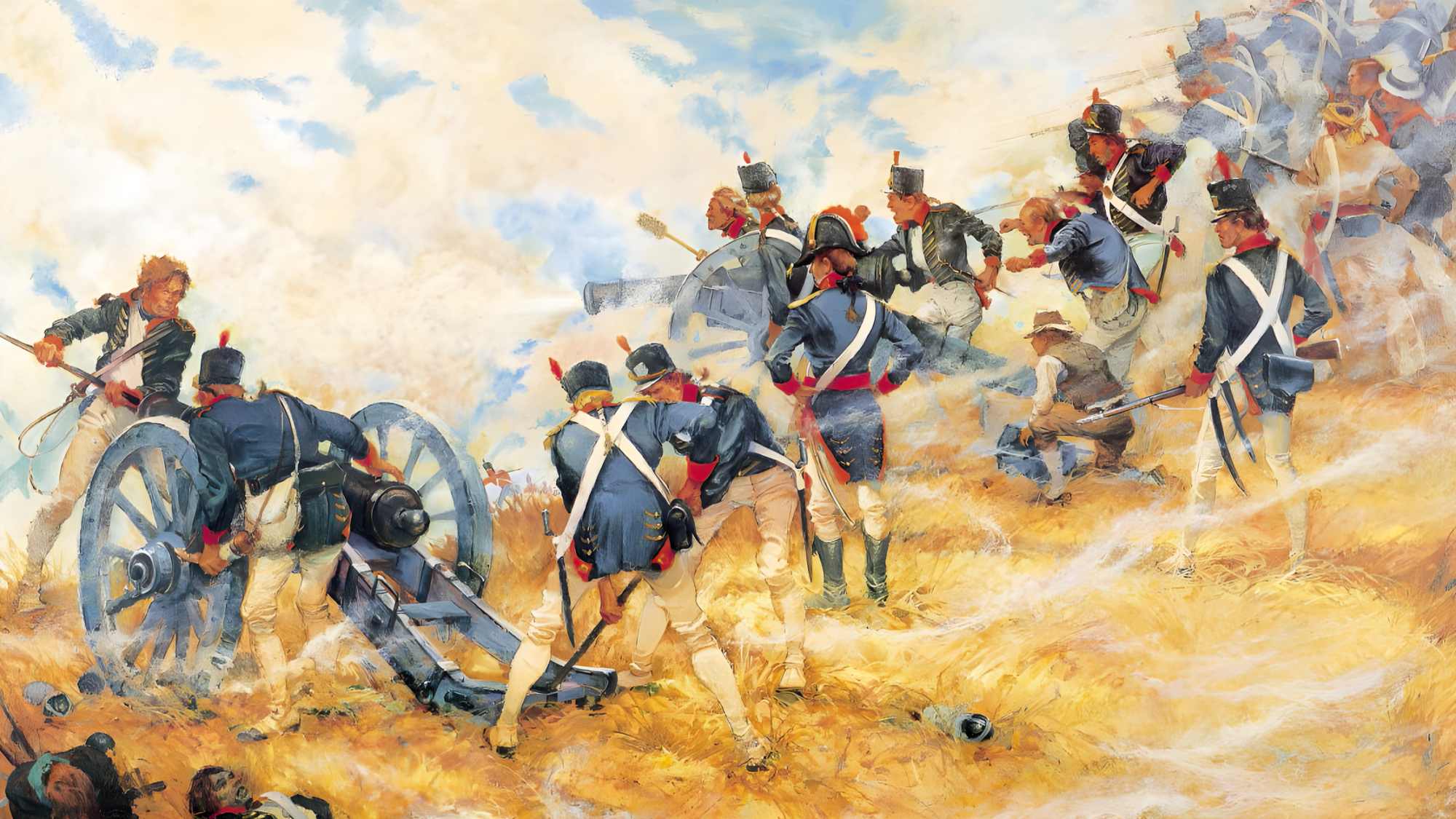
- Joshua Barney directing American artillery at the battle
Date	August 24, 1814
Location	Bladensburg, Maryland 38°56′12″N 76°56′15″W
Result	British victory

Belligerents
United Kingdom	United States

Commanders and leaders
(United Kingdom) George Cockburn (United Kingdom) Robert Ross	(United States) William Winder (United States) Joshua Barney (POW)

Strength
4,370–4,500; 3 artillery pieces 60 rocket munitions on 3 launching frames	Over 6,000–7,000; 11 artillery pieces

Casualties and losses
64 killed 185 wounded	10–26 killed 40–51 wounded 100–120 captured
- Location within Maryland Bladensburg (the United States)

The Battle of Bladensburg, also known as the Bladensburg Races, took place on August 24, 1814, during the Chesapeake campaign of the War of 1812 at Bladensburg, Maryland. It has been described as "the greatest disgrace ever dealt to American arms". A British force of army regulars and Royal Marines routed a combined U.S. force of Regular Army and state militia troops. The American defeat resulted in the British capture and burning of the national capital of Washington, the only time that the city has fallen to a foreign invader.

== Background ==
=== British plans ===
For the first two years of the War of 1812 (1812–1815), the British had been preoccupied with the war against Napoleon and his French Empire (France) in Europe. However, warships of the Royal Navy led by Rear Admiral George Cockburn, second in command of the North American Station, controlled the Chesapeake Bay from early 1813 onwards and had captured large numbers of U.S. trading vessels. They occupied Tangier Island off the coast of Virginia, establishing Fort Albion as an anchorage and staging area. As many as 1,200 British soldiers would be stationed there.

Raiding parties had destroyed foundries and batteries and sacked several small towns, but lack of troops restricted Cockburn to mounting small-scale raids, the largest of which was the Battle of Craney Island, in the Hampton Roads harbor near Norfolk, Virginia, which involved 2,000 men of the British Army and the Royal Marines. Although Cockburn withdrew from the Chesapeake Bay late in 1813, his sailors had taken soundings and even placed buoys to mark channels and sandbars, in preparation for a renewed campaign in 1814.

Major-General Robert Ross, the British commander at Bladensburg

By April 1814, Napoleon had been defeated and was exiled to the island of Elba off the coast of Italy, and large numbers of British ships and troops were now free to be used to prosecute the former backwater war with the United States. As part of the measures taken to prosecute the war more vigorously, Admiral Sir John Borlase Warren was replaced as commander in chief of the North American Station by Vice Admiral Sir Alexander Cochrane, who was a more active and experienced officer who often expressed his rancour with the United States.

Most of the newly available troops went to the continental colonies of British North America where Lieutenant General Sir George Prevost (who was Captain-General and Governor-in-Chief in and over the Provinces of Upper-Canada, Lower-Canada, Nova-Scotia, and New-Brunswick, and their several Dependencies, Vice-Admiral of the same, Lieutenant-General and Commander of all His Majesty’s Forces in the said Provinces of Lower Canada and Upper-Canada, Nova-Scotia and New-Brunswick, and their several Dependencies, and in the islands of Newfoundland, Prince Edward, Cape Breton and the Bermudas, &c. &c. &c.') was preparing to lead an invasion into New York from the Canadas, heading for Lake Champlain and the upper Hudson River. However, the Earl of Bathurst, Secretary of State for War and the Colonies, dispatched a brigade of 2,500 soldiers, mainly veterans from the Duke of Wellington's army, and commanded by Major General Robert Ross, to the Imperial fortress of Bermuda, from where a blockade of the U.S. coast and even the occupation of some coastal islands had been overseen throughout the war. Ross' brigade arrived there aboard HMS Royal Oak, three frigates, three sloops and ten other vessels. The intention was for this force to carry out raids on the Atlantic Seaboard to "effect a diversion on the coasts of the United States of America in favor [sic] of the army employed in the defence of Upper and Lower Canada".

=== United States plans and preparations ===
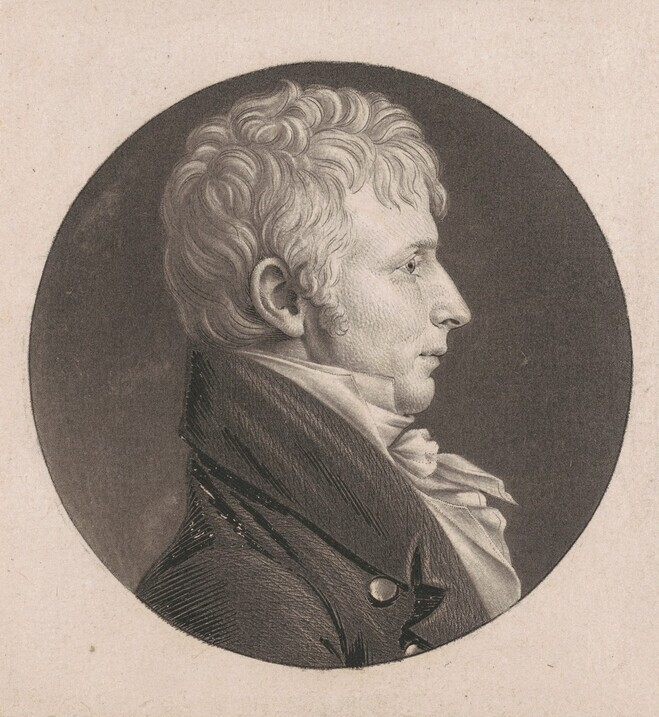
Brigadier General William H. Winder, the American commander at the Battle of Bladensburg and nephew to Levin Winder, the governor of Maryland

Meanwhile, Albert Gallatin, President James Madison's nominated commissioner for negotiations with the British government, sent news from Europe of Napoleon's abdication and the apparent hardening of British attitudes towards the United States. On 1 July 1814, Madison summoned his cabinet to discuss the increased threat to the United States' Atlantic coast, including Washington, although the Secretary of War, John Armstrong, insisted that the British would not attack Washington, since it was strategically unimportant. He felt the most likely target would be the city of Baltimore, which offered more commercial targets and plunder than Washington. Armstrong was half right; the British would launch attacks against both Baltimore and Washington.

Nevertheless, on 2 July, Madison designated the area around Washington and Baltimore as the United States Army's Tenth Military District and, without consulting Armstrong, appointed Brigadier General William H. Winder as its commander. Winder was the nephew of Levin Winder, Federalist Governor of Maryland. He had practiced law in Baltimore before being commissioned as a colonel in 1812 and had only recently been exchanged after having been captured at the Battle of Stoney Creek in July 1813. On 5 July, he and Armstrong conferred. Winder suggested calling up some militia in advance of any attack, but Armstrong insisted that militia could best be used on the spur of the moment. Winder spent a month visiting the forts and settlements in his new command. Armstrong did not provide him with any staff, and despite his fears that the British could launch an attack against almost any point with very little warning, Winder did not order any field fortifications to be constructed, nor make any other preparations.

== Campaign ==
=== British moves ===
Although Major General Ross commanded the British troops in the Chesapeake Bay, the point of attack was to be decided by Vice Admiral Cochrane, who had concentrated four ships of the line, twenty frigates and sloops of war and twenty transports carrying Ross's troops at Tangier Island. Rear Admiral Cockburn, Cochrane's second in command, favoured a quick attack on Washington, but Ross was not eager. His men had been confined aboard their transports for nearly three months, and he lacked cavalry, artillery, and transport. Ross was also wary of the U.S. Chesapeake Bay Flotilla (three gunboats and ten gun-armed barges) lurking in the Patuxent River. His first objective had to be the capture or destruction of the U.S. flotilla.

Cochrane dispatched two forces to make diversions. The frigate HMS Menelaus and some small craft threatened a raid on Baltimore, while two frigates and some bomb ketches and a rocket vessel ascended the Potomac River, an expedition that resulted in the successful Raid on Alexandria. His main body proceeded into the Patuxent. Ross's troops landed at Benedict on 19 August, and began marching upstream the following day, while Cockburn proceeded up the river with ships' boats and small craft. By 21 August, Ross had reached Nottingham, (Note: Not to be confused with Nottingham, Maryland, the "Nottingham" located on the Patuxent River was a community situated on what is now the line between Croom and Baden.) and Commodore Joshua Barney was forced to destroy the gunboats and other sailing craft of the Chesapeake Bay Flotilla the next day, and retreat overland towards Washington.

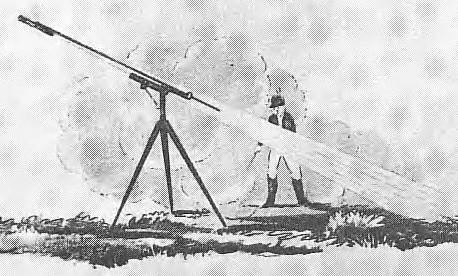
A rocket launched from a tripod

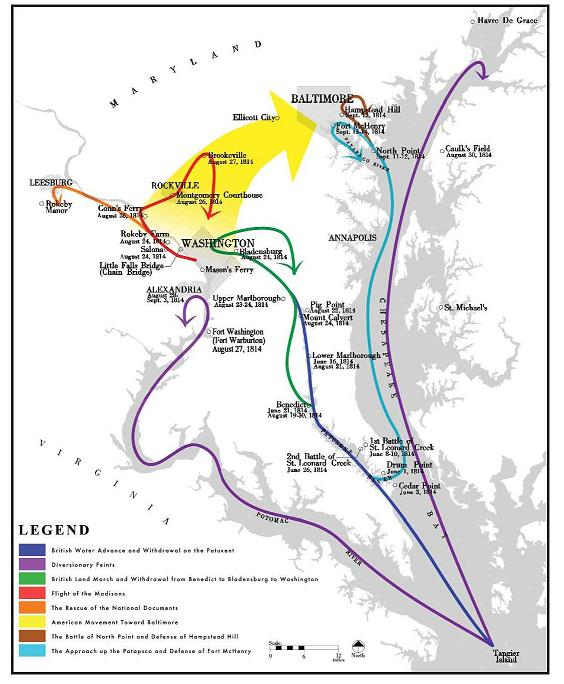
Map of the Chesapeake campaign

From Nottingham, Ross continued up the Patuxent to Upper Marlboro, from where he could threaten to advance on either Washington or Baltimore, confusing the Americans. He might have taken the capital almost unopposed had he advanced on August 23, but instead he rested his men and organised his force. On the night of 23–24 August, at the urging of Rear Admiral Cockburn and some of the British Army officers under his own command, Ross decided to risk an attack on Washington. He had four infantry battalions, a battalion of Royal Marines, a force of around 100 African-American Colonial Marines of the Corps of Colonial Marines, which was composed of locally recruited black refugees from slavery, a Congreve rocket detachment from the Royal Marines battalion, a similar rocket detachment commanded by Captain Deacon of the Royal Artillery, 50 Royal Sappers and Miners, 100 gunners from the Navy and 275 sailors to carry supplies. His force totaled 4,370 men, with one 6-pounder gun, two 3-pounder guns and sixty rocket projectiles each weighing 12 pounds. (Note: The rocket itself would be attached to the side of a stick, doing so allowed them to be launched at a greater range. The "launcher" is the stick, which, when coupled with the rocket, would be mounted upon a bombarding frame, and fired.) Rear Admiral Cockburn accompanied this force.

Ross had a choice of two routes by which he could advance: from the south via Woodyard or from the east via Bladensburg. The former route would involve finding a way across an unfordable part of the Eastern Branch of the Potomac (now called the Anacostia River) if the U.S. destroyed the bridge on the route. In the morning of 24 August, Ross made a feint on the southern route, before suddenly swerving northwards towards Bladensburg.

=== U.S. moves ===
In Washington, Brigadier General Winder could call in theory upon 15,000 militia, but he actually had only 120 dragoons and 300 other regulars, plus 1,500 poorly trained and under-equipped militiamen at his immediate disposal. On 20 August, Winder ordered this force to advance south towards Long Old Fields and Woodyard (off modern Route 5) to confront the British forces at Upper Marlboro. After a brief clash with Ross's leading units on 22 August, Winder ordered a hasty retreat to the Long Old Fields. He feared that the British might make a surprise night attack, in which the British would hold the advantage in organisation and discipline while Winder's own advantage in artillery would count for little. Winder had been captured in just such a night attack at Stoney Creek the year before.

Although he rode with the forces directly challenging the British invaders, Winder realized that Bladensburg was the key to Washington's defence. Bladensburg commanded the roads to Baltimore and Annapolis, along which reinforcements were moving to join him. The town also lay on one of the only two routes available for the British to advance on Washington, in fact the preferred route because the Eastern Branch was easy to ford there. On 20 August, Winder had ordered Brigadier General Tobias Stansbury to move from Baltimore to Bladensburg, "take the best position in advance of Bladensburg ... and should he be attacked, to resist as long as possible".

On 22 August, Stansbury deployed his force on Lowndes Hill, where he hastily dug earthworks for artillery emplacements. The road from Annapolis crossed the hill, and the road from Upper Marlboro ran to its south and west. Furthermore, the roads to Washington, Georgetown, and Baltimore all intersected between it and Bladensburg. From this position, Stansbury dominated the approaches available to the British while controlling the lines of communication.

At 2:30 a.m. on August 23, Stansbury received a message from Winder, informing him that he had withdrawn across the Eastern Branch and he intended to fire the lower bridge. Surprised, Stansbury was seized by an irrational fear that his right flank could be turned. Instead of strengthening his commanding position, he immediately decamped and marched his exhausted troops across Bladensburg bridge, which he did not burn, to a brickyard 1.5 miles (2.4 km) further on. He had thus thrown away almost every tactical advantage available to him.

Meanwhile, in Washington, every government department was hastily packing its records and evacuating them to Maryland or Virginia, in requisitioned or hired carts or river boats.

== Battle ==
=== U.S. dispositions ===
Winder now had at least 1,000 regulars from the U.S. Army, U.S. Navy, and U.S. Marine Corps, plus about 7,000 less than dependable militia and volunteers from the District of Columbia, Maryland and Virginia. Official reports of his strength range from 5,000 to 9,000 men. Winder's report to the Secretary of War stated that he was able "By the most active and harassing movement of the troops to interpose before the enemy at Bladensburg about 5,000." Ross, the British commander, estimated the American force at between 8,000 and 9,000 men, with 300–400 cavalry. From other contemporary sources, the forces available for the defense of Washington probably numbered about 7,170, of which 6,370 were at Bladensburg.

Stansbury's force consisted of the 1st (Ragan's), 2nd (Schutz's), and 5th (Sterrett's) regiments of Maryland Militia, three companies of volunteer riflemen commanded by Major William Pinkney (a former United States Attorney General), and two companies of Baltimore artillery, with six 6-pounder guns. Ragan's and Schutz's regiments were hastily organised amalgamations of companies, all without uniforms. Sterrett's 5th Maryland Regiment was a "Dandy" regiment of uniformed volunteers.

Stansbury chose a defensible position, though hardly the best one available, on the west side of the Eastern Branch of the Potomac opposite the town of Bladensburg. The artillery was posted in an earthwork hastily constructed by Colonel Decius Wadsworth, the Army's Commissary General of Ordnance, to the north of the bridge. The earthwork had been designed for heavier weapons, and the 6-pounder field guns had a restricted field of fire through its embrasures. They could not use oblique fire to prevent the bridge from being seized. The Maryland militia infantry regiments were posted in a line of battle south of the earthwork, too far away to protect the artillery and exposed to British fire. Both Winder and Secretary of State James Monroe later tinkered with Stansbury's dispositions. Monroe moved companies and detachments without correcting the major faults in Stansbury's position, while Winder moved the three militia regiments into even more exposed positions behind the Baltimore artillery's redoubt, though Monroe reinforced them with a militia artillery company under Captain Benjamin Burch. Monroe also ordered the 120 U.S. Dragoons under Colonel Jacint Lavall to occupy a ravine behind Stansbury's infantry, but left them without further orders or information.

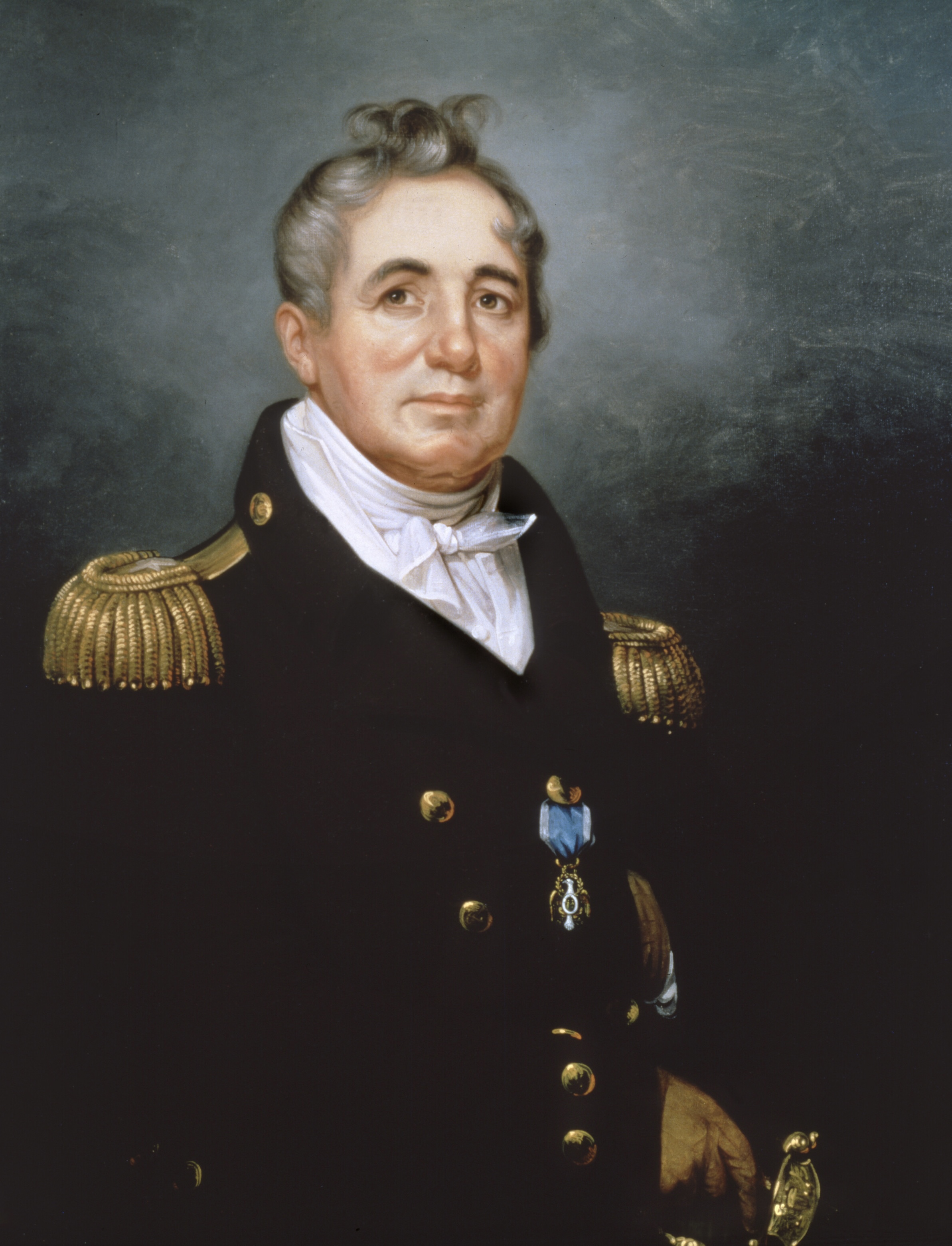
Commodore Joshua Barney, U.S. Navy commander of the Chesapeake Bay Flotilla, whose sailors and Marines' artillery battery briefly held off the British advance on the upper hill of present-day Fort Lincoln Cemetery

Behind Stansbury's troops and to his right was a brigade of District of Columbia militia under Brigadier General Walter Smith, which had marched from Long Old Fields. Smith's brigade was strongly posted behind a creek and along the crest of some rising ground, but Smith had not conferred with Stansbury before deploying his brigade, and there was a gap of a mile between them. Smith's men would be unable to support Stansbury, and if Stansbury were overcome, Smith's left flank would be open to attack. A battalion under Lieutenant Colonel Kramer lined the creek. Joshua Barney's men, with two 18-pounder guns and three 12-pounder guns drawn from the Washington Navy Yard, were posted astride the Washington turnpike. (Barney had originally been posted to guard the lower bridge over the Eastern Branch and destroy it if necessary, but he had pleaded to President Madison and the Secretary of the Navy that he and his men were needed where the action was.) To Barney's left was the 1st Regiment of "District" Militia, a militia artillery company under Major George Peter with six 6-pounder guns and a provisional battalion of regulars under Lieutenant Colonel William Scott. The 2nd District Militia were posted behind Peter and Scott.

To Smith's right rear in turn was a column of Maryland militia under Colonel William Beall, which had just arrived from Annapolis. A regiment of Virginia Militia under Colonel George Minor was delayed by administrative confusion and arrived on the field only as the battle ended. (Minor's men had arrived in Washington without arms or ammunition. When Minor prevailed on Winder to order muskets to be distributed on the morning of the battle, the junior officer responsible for issuing their flints insisted that they be returned and recounted.)

Stansbury's troops were tired from two days' constant alarms and redeployments, and Smith's and Beall's men were equally exhausted from having force-marched to the battlefield through a hot and humid summer day, with many diversions and unnecessary panics.

=== Action ===
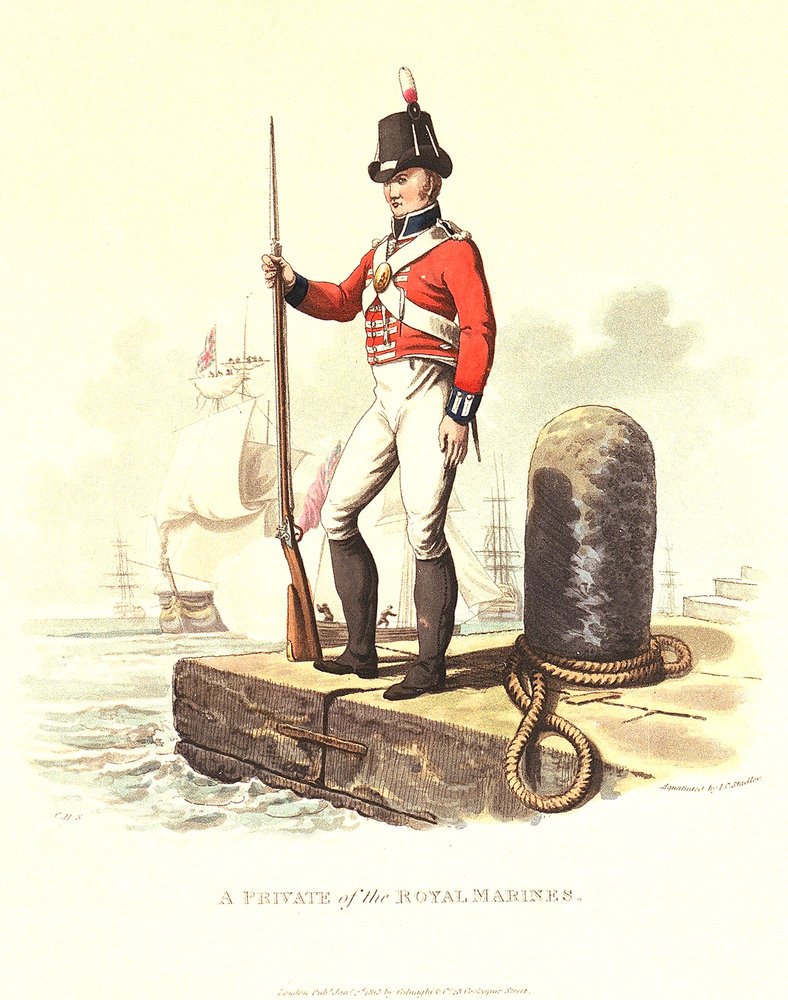
Private in the Royal Marines, who would have fought at Bladensburg

Around noon on 24 August, Ross's army reached Bladensburg. Stansbury's tactical errors quickly became apparent. Had he held Lowndes Hill, Stansbury could have made the British approach a costly one (although this would have involved fighting with the East Branch at his back, which would not have improved his men's morale and might have been disastrous in a hasty retreat). Had he held the brick structures of Bladensburg, which were ready-made mini-fortresses, he might have embroiled Ross's troops in bloody street fighting. Because the bridge had not been burned, it had to be defended. Stansbury's infantry and artillery were posted too far from the river's edge to contest a crossing effectively.

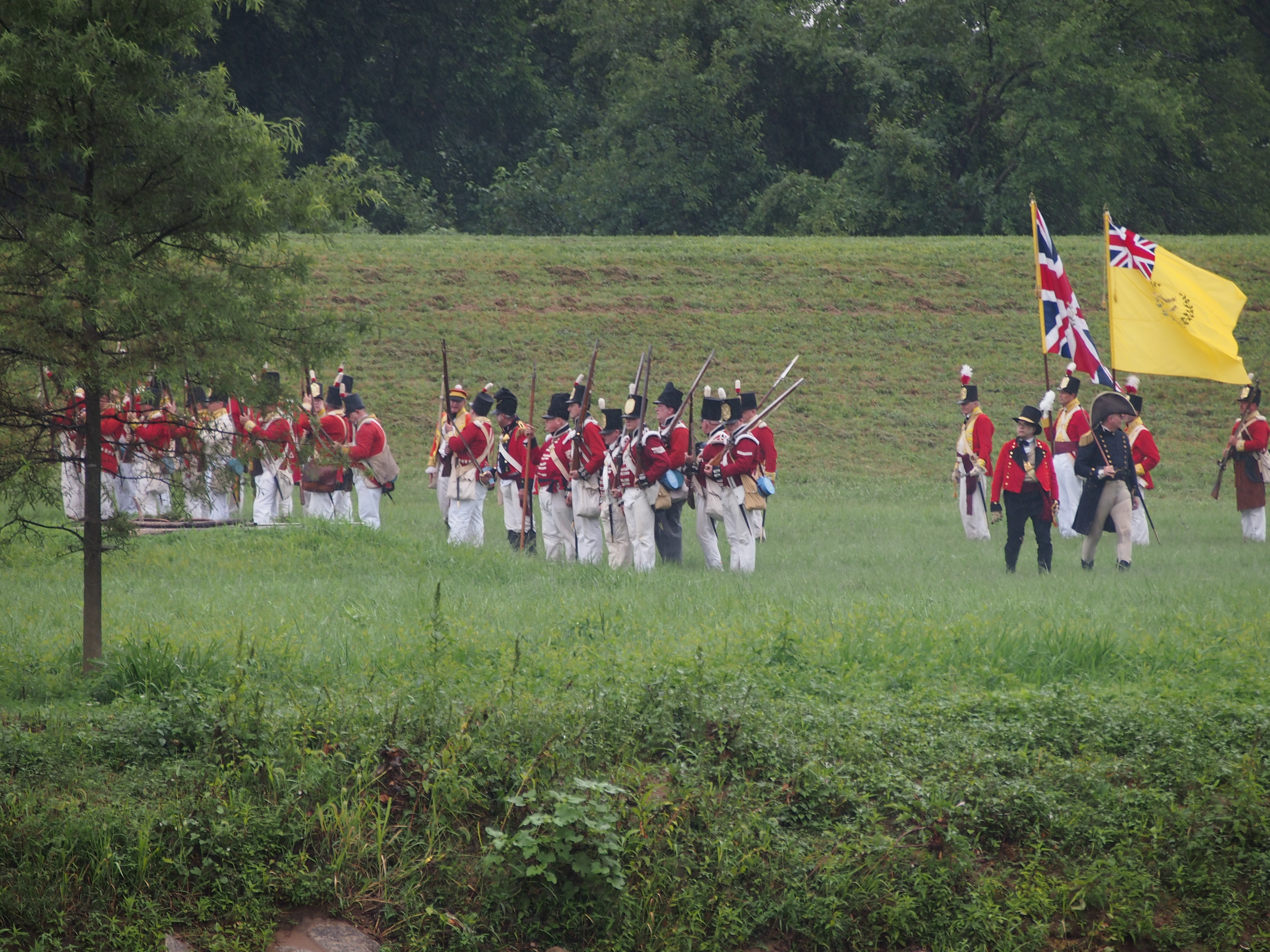
The 200th anniversary reenactment of the battle, on August 23, 2014, showing the British line infantrymen advancing

The British advance was led by Colonel William Thornton's 85th Light Infantry and the three light companies of the other line battalions along with around 100 African-American Colonial Marines. The Baltimore artillery and Pinkney's riflemen stopped Thornton's first rush across the bridge. Major Harry Smith, Ross's Brigade major, considered that Ross and Thornton had attacked too hastily, without waiting for other units to support Thornton, or sending forward skirmishers across the fords to cover the advance. However, Thornton's men eventually established themselves on the south bank of the river, and began advancing in loose order. The Baltimore artillery had solid shot only, which was of little use against scattered skirmishers. Pinkney, whose elbow was shattered by a musket ball, was driven back and as Thornton's men closed in, the Baltimore artillerymen retreated with five of their cannon, being forced to spike and abandon another.

The British 1/44th Regiment had meanwhile forded the East Branch above the bridge. As they prepared to envelop the American left, Winder led a counter-attack against Thornton by Sterrett's 5th Maryland militia, joined by other detachments. As the 5th Maryland exchanged fire with British infantry in cover on three sides, Schutz's and Ragan's conscripted militia broke and fled under a barrage of rockets. Winder issued confused orders for three of Captain Burch's guns to fall back rather than cover Sterrett's retreat, and the 5th Maryland and the rest of Stansbury's brigade fled the field, sweeping most of Lavall's horsemen with them.

The British pressed on and were engaged by Smith's brigade and Barney's and Peters's guns. Thornton's light brigade made several frontal attacks over the creek, but were repulsed three times by artillery fire, and were counter-attacked by Barney's detachment. Thornton was badly wounded and his light infantry were driven back with heavy casualties. However, as the 1/44th threatened Smith's open left flank, Winder ordered Smith to retreat also.

Smith's brigade fell back initially in good order, but Winder's orders to retreat apparently did not reach Barney, and his situation worsened when the civilian drivers of the carts carrying his reserve ammunition joined the general rout, leaving the Marine gun crews with fewer than three rounds of canister, round shot and charges in their caissons. Barney's 300 sailors and 103 Marines nevertheless held off the British frontal attacks, launching counter-attacks armed with hand pikes and cutlasses, with cries of "Board'em! Board'em!". Eventually, as the British 1/4th and 1/44th Regiments enveloped their left flank, Barney ordered his men to retreat to avoid capture. Barney himself was badly wounded in the thigh with a musket ball and was taken prisoner. The British later congratulated Barney for his bravery and released him on parole.

Beall's troops were also driven from the hill they held, after an ineffectual resistance.

Winder had not given any instructions before the battle in the case of a retreat and as the American militia left the battlefield, he issued contradictory orders to halt and reform, or fall back on the Capitol where Secretary of War John Armstrong Jr. hoped vainly to make a stand, using the federal buildings as strongpoints, or retreat through Georgetown to Tenleytown. Most of the militia simply fled the field with no destination in mind, or deserted the ranks to see to the safety of their families.

The efforts of British commander Robert Ross during the battle deserve praise, according to journalist Steve Vogel, in his book about that era. "He conducted a brilliant campaign of deception, feinting one way or the other, marching and then doubling back, and was able to paralyze the Americans and prevent them from defending Bladensburg".

Cockburn was quick in reporting back to his commanding officer the victory. In so doing, his choice of wording refers to the >1,000 light troops initially deployed, yet fails to mention the cumulative number that participated in the battle.

== Casualties ==
Although the British had suffered heavier casualties than the U.S. (many inflicted by Barney's guns), (Note: 'The loss on the part of the English was severe, since, out of two thirds of the engaged [being unscaved, however], upwards of five hundred men were killed and wounded.' Gleig is mistaken in 1827 in thinking that a third of the men were casualties, the figure was closer to one sixth.) (Note: From the circumstance of the American artillery... completely enfilading the bridge.. our loss was much more severe than it would otherwise have been...Grand total, 249 hors de combat.) they had completely routed the defenders. British casualties were 64 dead and 185 wounded. Some of the British dead "died without sustaining a scratch. They collapsed from heat exhaustion and the strain of punishing forced marches over the five days since landing at Benedict". Heidler's Encyclopedia of the War of 1812 gives the U.S. loss as "10 or 12 killed, 40 wounded" and "about 100" captured. Henry Adams and John S. Williams both give the American casualties as 26 killed and 51 wounded. (Note: Quimby, p. 689. Quimby refers to History of the United States of America during the Administration of Thomas Jefferson and James Madison (New York, The Antiquarian Press, 1962) by Henry Adams and History of the Invasion and Capture of Washington, etc. (New York, Harper and Brothers, 1857) by John S. Williams.)

Joseph A. Whitehorne says the Americans lost "120 taken prisoner, many of these wounded". Ten cannon and two colors, belonging to the 1st Harford Light Dragoons {Maryland} and the James City Light Infantry {VA}, were captured by the British.

For many of the U.S. wounded, Naval Hospital Washington was the primary treatment center. Thirty-three incoming patients recorded in August and September 1814 were American seamen, soldiers, and marines wounded from Bladensburg or subsequent engagements. One British soldier, Jeremiah McCarthy is also recorded. The majority of those wounded however, were first treated on the field of battle and often by British surgeons. Despite the war, both sides generally respected hospitals and afforded care to the enemy wounded. The naval hospital's 1814 register reflects U.S. seamen Frederick Ernest and George Gallagher both endured amputations in the field.

== Aftermath ==
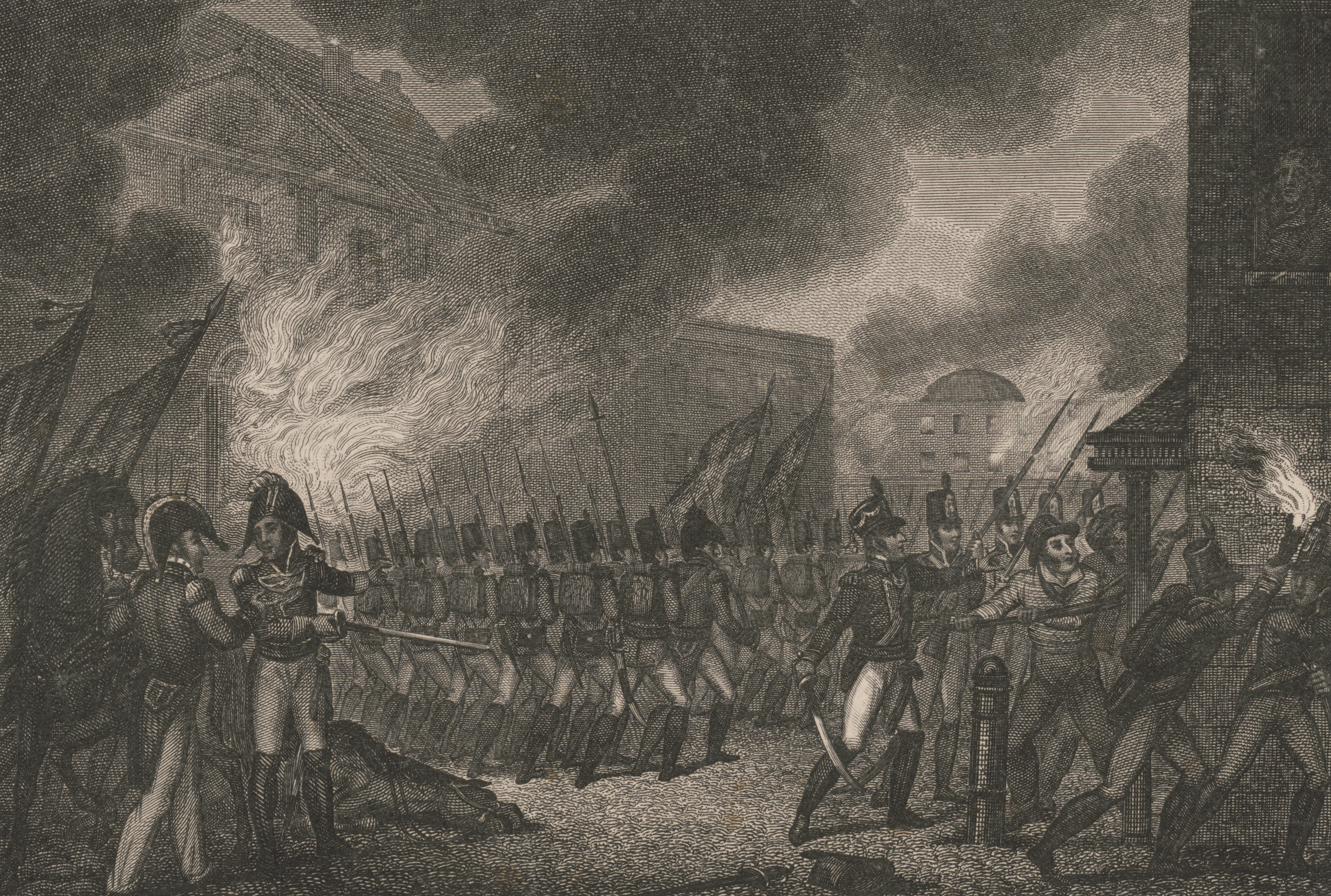
1815 illustration of the Burning of Washington

The hasty and disorganized U.S. retreat led to the battle becoming known as the "Bladensburg Races" from an 1816 poem. The battle was termed "the greatest disgrace ever dealt to American arms" and "the most humiliating episode in American history". The American militiamen fled through the streets of Washington. It is purported that British Lieutenant George Gleig later wrote regarding the fleeing Americans: "Never did men with weapons in their hands make better use of their legs." President James Madison and most of the rest of the federal government had been present at the battle, and had nearly been captured. They, too, fled the capital, and scattered through Maryland and Virginia. That same night the British entered Washington unopposed and set fire to many of the government buildings in what became known as the Burning of Washington.

Lieutenant General Prevost had urged Vice Admiral Cochrane to avenge the raid on Port Dover on the north shore of Lake Erie earlier in the year, in which the undefended settlement had been set ablaze by American troops. Cochrane issued a proclamation that American property was forfeit; only the lives of the civilian inhabitants were to be spared. He had issued a private memorandum to his captains however, which allowed them to levy what was effectively protection money in return for sparing buildings. In fact, there was little or no looting or wanton destruction of private property by Ross's troops or Cochrane's sailors during the advance and the occupation of Washington. However, when the British later withdrew to their ships in the Patuxent, discipline was less effective (partly because of fatigue) and there was considerable looting by foraging parties and by stragglers and deserters.

After Major General Ross was killed at the Battle of North Point on 12 September 1814, his descendants were given an augmentation of honor to their armorial bearings by a royal warrant dated August 25, 1815, and their family name was changed to the victory title Ross-of-Bladensburg in memory of Ross's most famous battle.

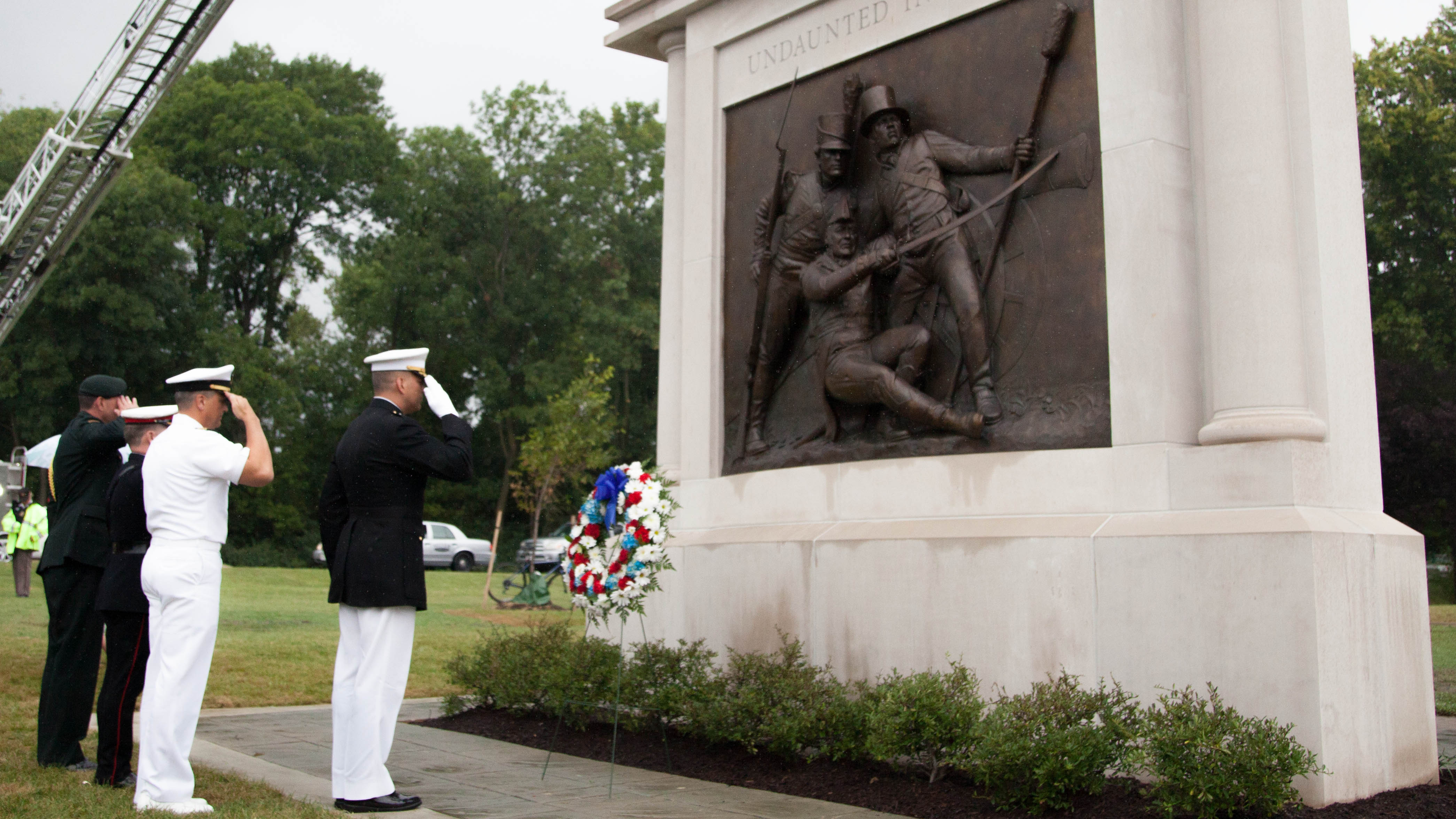
Canadian Army, Royal Marines, U.S. Navy and U.S. Marine Corps officers salute during the dedication of Maryland's Bladensburg Memorial on August 23, 2014

The lineages of the 5th Maryland Regiment and the Columbian Division are perpetuated by the present-day 175th Infantry (ARNG MD) and the HHD/372nd Military Police Battalion (ARNG DC), two of only nineteen Army National Guard units with campaign credit for the War of 1812. The lineages of the old 36th and 38th Infantry Regiments are perpetuated by three currently active battalions of the 4th Infantry (1–4 Inf, 2–4 Inf and 3–4 Inf).

In the British Army, the battle honor "Bladensburg" was awarded to the 4th, 21st, 44th and 85th Regiments of Foot. The successor units within the British Army are, respectively: The Duke of Lancaster's Regiment (via the King's Own Royal Border Regiment), the Royal Regiment of Scotland (via the Royal Highland Fusiliers), the Royal Anglian Regiment (via the Essex Regiment), and the Rifles (via the King's Shropshire Light Infantry).

== African Americans ==
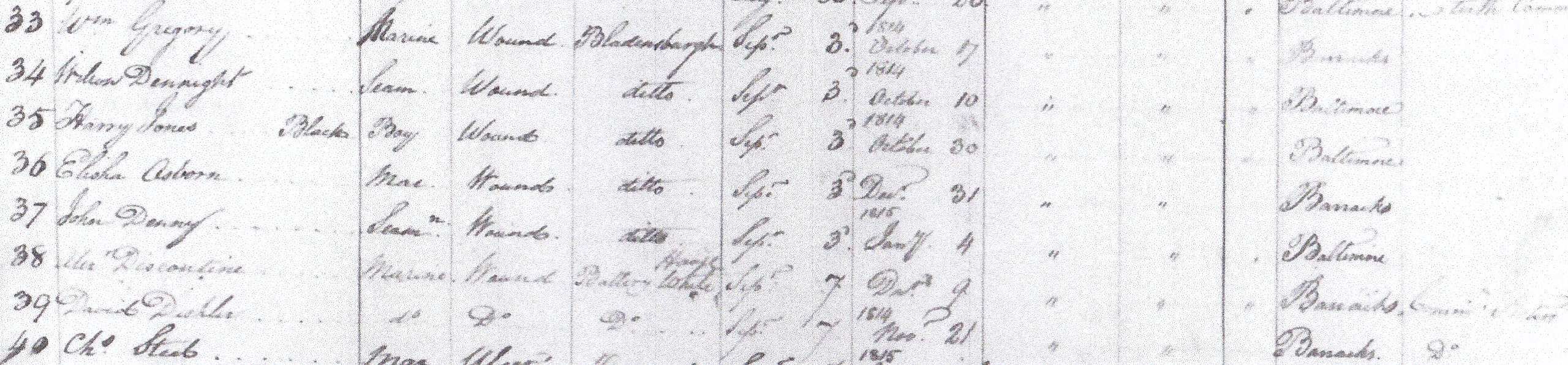
The black American seaman Harry Jones is enumerated patient No. 35 on the 1814 Register of Patients, Naval Hospital Washington, which stated, "Harry Jones black boy wound Bladensburg." "Boy" in this context was a reference to rank. "Boys" in the early navy were simply young sailors in training who were 12 to 18.

Black sailors fought as part of the U.S. force at Bladensburg, many as members of Commodore Joshua Barney's naval flotilla. This force provided artillery support during the battle, and were praised for their bravery by their adversaries. One of the best accounts is that of Charles Ball, born 1785. Ball served with Commodore Barney at Bladensburg and later helped man the defenses at Baltimore. (Note: In his 1837 memoir, Ball reflected on the Battle of Bladensburg: "I stood at my gun, until the Commodore was shot down... if the militia regiments, that lay upon our right and left, could have been brought to charge the British, in close fight, as they crossed the bridge, we should have killed or taken the whole of them in a short time; but the militia ran like sheep chased by dogs.")

Anecdotal accounts from the time period suggest that anywhere from 15 to 50 percent of any given U.S. naval vessel’s crew were of African descent

The exact number of black sailors in the War of 1812 is difficult for historians to determine, since "navy muster rolls rarely mention race or ethnicity." Modern scholars estimate that black soldiers made up 15% to 20% of U.S. naval forces in the War of 1812.

Just before the battle, Commodore Barney, on being asked by Madison "if his negroes would not run on the approach of the British?" replied: "No, Sir... they don't know how to run; they will die by their guns first." The Commodore was correct, as the men did not run; one such man was young sailor Harry Jones (No. 35), apparently a free black man. Jones was wounded in the final action at Bladensburg and remained a patient at the Naval Hospital Washington, D.C., for nearly two months.

Black troops also fought on the British side with the Corps of Colonial Marines in the attacks on Bladensburg and Washington, D.C. Vice Admiral Cochrane reformed the corps, which had been disbanded in 1810, in 1814, deliberately recruiting enslaved black Americans with a promise of freedom for themselves and their families. Recruits to the corps received the enlistment bounty, uniforms and pay the same as their Royal Marine counterparts. Following the Treaty of Ghent, the British kept their promise and in 1815 evacuated the Colonial Marines and their families to Halifax, Nova Scotia, and Bermuda.

== Order of battle ==
=== British ===
- Regulars (total: 4500 all ranks) during the Chesapeake campaign.

(Major General Robert Ross)

- 1st (Light) Brigade (Colonel William Thornton) (1100 men)
  - 85th Regiment of Foot (Bucks Volunteers)(Light Infantry)
  - Light companies, 1/4th, 21st, 1/44th Foot
  - Company of Royal Marines, commanded by Lt Athelstan Stevens, detached from the Royal Marine battalion
  - Rocket Detachment of 26 Royal Marine Artillery gunners, commanded by Lt John Lawrence, likewise detached from the Royal Marine battalion
  - Company of the Corps of Colonial Marines under the temporary command of Captain Thomas Reed of the 6th West India Regiment
- 2nd Brigade (Colonel Arthur Brooke) (1460 men) – in the rear
  - 1st Battalion, 4th (King's Own) Regiment of Foot, minus the Light infantry company
  - 1st Battalion, 44th (East Essex) Regiment of Foot, minus the Light infantry company
- 3rd Brigade (Colonel Patterson) (ca. 1460 men) – in the rear
  - 21st Regiment (Royal North British Fusiliers), minus the Light infantry company
  - 2nd Battalion, Royal Marines (commanded by Major James Malcolm) less one infantry company with the 1st Brigade, and the Rocket Detachment with the 1st Brigade.
- composite battalion (formed from ship-based Marines) commanded by Captain John Robyns and guarding the shoreline at Benedict, documented in his diary as having a strength of 350.
- Three companies of Royal Artillery commanded by Captain John Michell, Captain Lewis Carmichael and Captain Adam Crawford.

Note: there were a total of 1350 Marines throughout the Chesapeake campaign

=== American ===
- Regulars (total: 960 to 1160 all ranks).
  - 1 Squadron, Regiment of Light Dragoons, commanded by Colonel Jacint Laval, 140 horses.
  - 1 Infantry Battalion, United States Regulars commanded by Lieutenant Colonel William Scott – variously reported at either 300 or 500 men all ranks.
  - Detachment of 103 United States Marines and 300 US Navy Flotilla men (sailors), under command of Commodore Joshua Barney, 400 (approx) all ranks with 5 heavy artillery pieces (two 18-pounders (naval) and three wheeled 12-pounders (USMC).
- Militia (total: 6,203)
  - District of Columbia 1st Regiment of Militia, Colonel George Magruder, 535 all ranks
  - District of Columbia 2nd Regiment of Militia, Colonel Wm. Brent, 535 all ranks
  - Company of District of Columbia Union Rifles, Captain John Davidson, 116 all ranks
  - Company of District of Columbia Rifles, Captain John Stull, 116 all ranks
  - Detachment of Navy Yard Rifles (volunteers), Captain John Doughty, 116 all ranks
  - Detachment of Captain Maynard, 100 men all ranks
  - Detachment of Captain Waring, 100 men all ranks
  - District of Columbia Dragoons, 50 horse
  - Battery, The Washington Irish Artillery, Captain Ben Burch, ? x 6-pounders, 150 all ranks
  - Battery, The District of Columbia Militia Artillery (Georgetown Artillery), Major George Peter, ? x 6-pounders, 150 all ranks.
  - 1st Regiment, Baltimore County Militia, Colonel Jonathan Shutz, 675 all ranks
  - 2nd Regiment, Baltimore County Militia, Colonel John Ragan, 675 all ranks
  - 5th Baltimore City Regiment, Colonel Joseph Sterrett, 500 all ranks
  - 1 Battalion, Baltimore Rifles, Major William Pinkney, 150 all ranks
  - 2 Batteries, Baltimore Militia Artillery, ? x 6-pounders, 150 all ranks
  - Annapolis Militia, Colonel Hood, 800 all ranks
  - Battalion, Maryland State Militia, 250 all ranks
  - Harford County Light Dragoons 240 horse
  - Virginia Militia Dragoons, 100 horse (amalgamated with Laval's Dragoons during the battle)
  - 60th Virginia Militia Regiment, Colonel George Minor, 700 all ranks (Arrived late and without ammunition and held in reserve)
  - The James City Light Infantry, 100 all ranks. (their colors were captured by the British)
- Total Regular and Militia: 7,163 to 7,363
  - 2 × 18-pounder guns
  - 3 × 12-pounder guns
  - 6 × 6-pounder guns

== Battlefield preservation ==
Like many historic battlefields that once belonged to the rural American landscape, urban sprawl and heavily-traveled roads associated with urbanization in the DC metro area have made it very difficult to preserve and acquire the complete site of the Bladensburg battleground. However, the City of Bladensburg, in association with Prince George's County and the State of Maryland, has set up a number of historical markers in various places of importance on the battlefield and offers a walking tour, with a free audio "tour guide" to help one explore the battlefield itself. Prince George's County had also established a museum for the battle at the Bladensburg Waterfront Park, but the museum is indefinitely closed.

== Bibliography ==
- Altoff, Gerard T. (1996). Amongst My Best Men: African-Americans and the War of 1812. Put-in-Bay, OH: The Perry Group. ISBN 978-1-88-779402-2.
- Ball, Charles (1837). Slavery in the United States: A Narrative of the Life and Adventures of Charles Ball. New York: John S. Taylor.
- Brodine, Charles E.; Crawford, Michael J.; Hughes, Christine F. (2007). Ironsides! The Ship, the Men and the Wars of the USS Constitution. Tucson: Fireship Press. ISBN 978-1-93-475714-7.
- Browne, James Alexander (1865). England's Artillerymen: An Historical Narrative of the Services of the Royal Artillery. Hall, Smart and Allen.
- Crawford, Michael J., ed. (2002). The Naval War of 1812: A Documentary History, Vol. 3. Washington: Naval Historical Center (GPO). ISBN 978-0-16-051224-7.
- Daughan, George C. (2011). 1812: The Navy's War. New York: Basic Books. ISBN 978-0-465-02046-1.
- Dudley, William S. (2021). Inside the U S Navy of 1812 - 1815. Baltimore: Johns Hopkins University Press. ISBN 978-1-42-144051-4.
- Duncan, Francis (1873). History of the Royal Regiment of Artillery, Vol. 2. London: John Murray. OCLC 1113269120.
- Eaton, Hamish Bain (1977). "Bladensburg". Journal of the Society for Army Historical Research. 55 (221): 8–14. JSTOR 44223167. "(FOR AMERICAN ORDER OF BATTLE ONLY)"
- Elting, John R. (1995). Amateurs to Arms! A Military History of the War of 1812. New York: Da Capo Press. ISBN 0-306-80653-3.
- Fraser, Edward; Carr-Laughton, L. G. (1930). The Royal Marine Artillery 1804-1923, Volume 1 [1804-1859]. London: The Royal United Services Institution. OCLC 4986867.
- Forester, C.S. (1956). The Age of Fighting Sail. New English Library. ISBN 0-939218-06-2.
- Gleig, George Robert (1827), The Campaigns of the British Army at Washington and New Orleans, 1814-1815, London: John Murray, ISBN 0-665-45385-X
- Gleig, George Robert (1840). "Recollections of the Expedition to the Chesapeake, and against New Orleans, by an Old Sub". United Service Journal (1).
- Heidler, David S.; Heidler, Jeanne T. (1997). Encyclopedia of the War of 1812. Annapolis, MD: Naval Institute Press. ISBN 1-59114-362-4.
- Hitsman, J. Mackay; Graves, Donald E. (1999). The Incredible War of 1812. Toronto: Robin Brass Studio. ISBN 1-896941-13-3.
- Howard, Hugh (2012). Mr. and Mrs. Madison's War. Bloomsbury. ISBN 978-1-60819-071-3.
- Howe, Daniel Walker (2007). What Hath God Wrought: the Transformation of America, 1815-1848. Oxford University Press US. p. 904. ISBN 978-0-19-507894-7.
- Lloyd, Ernest Marsh (1897). "Ross, Robert (1766-1814)" . In Lee, Sidney (ed.). Dictionary of National Biography. Vol. 49. London: Smith, Elder & Co.
- McCormack, Lauren (2020) [2005], Black Sailors during the War of 1812 (PDF), USS Constitution Museum, Revised by Kate Monea and Carl Herzog, 2020
- Mostert, Noel (2007). The Line upon a Wind. London: Jonathan Cape. ISBN 978-0-224-06922-9.
- Pitch, Anthony S. (2000). The Burning of Washington. Annapolis, MD: Naval Institute Press. ISBN 1-55750-425-3.
- Quimby, Robert S. (1997). The U.S. Army in the War of 1812: An Operational and Command Study. East Lansing: Michigan State University Press. ISBN 0-87013-441-8.
- Sharp, John G., ed. (1814), Register of Patients at Naval Hospital Washington DC 1814 With the Names of American Wounded from the Battle of Bladensburg, Naval History and Heritage Command, US Navy, Transcribed with Introduction and Notes by John G. Sharp in May 2018
- Snow, Peter (2013). When Britain burned the White House. London: John Murray (Publishers). ISBN 978-1-84854-611-0.
- Taylor, Alan (2014). The Internal Enemy: Slavery and War in Virginia, 1772–1832. W. W. Norton & Company. ISBN 978-0-3933-4973-3.
- Taylor, Elizabeth Dowling (2012). A Slave in the White House: Paul Jennings and the Madisons. New York: Palgrave Macmillan. ISBN 978-0-23-010893-6.
- Taylor, Matthew (2026). Black Redcoats: The Corps of Colonial Marines (second ed.). Barnsley, Yorkshire: Pen and Sword Books. ISBN 978-1-39-903402-9.
- Urwin, Gregory J. W. (1983). The United States Cavalry: An Illustrated History, 1776–1944. University of Oklahoma Press. ISBN 978-0806134758.
- Whitehorne, Joseph A. (1997). The Battle for Baltimore 1814. Baltimore: Nautical & Aviation Publishing. ISBN 1-877853-23-2.
- Williams, John S. (1857). History of the Invasion and Capture of Washington, and of the Events Which Preceded and Followed. New York: Harper & Brothers.
