= George Lewis (Royal Marines officer) =

Lieutenant-General George Lewis CB
- Born: 2 May 1774; Stoke Damerel, Devon
- Died: 14 September 1854 (aged 80); Stonehouse, Plymouth
- Military career
- Allegiance: United Kingdom of Great Britain and Ireland
- Branch: Royal Marines
- Rank: Lieutenant-General
- Conflicts: Napoleonic Wars; Peninsular War; War of 1812; Battle of Bladensburg; Battle of Baltimore; Attack on Washington
- Awards: Companion of the Order of the Bath

Lieutenant-General George Lewis CB (2 May 1774 – 14 September 1854) was a career officer in the Royal Marines, active during the Napoleonic Wars and the War of 1812. He rose to the rank of lieutenant general and served as Colonel Commandant of the Royal Marines, Portsmouth Division.

== Career ==
Lewis was born in Stoke Damerel, Devon on 2 May 1774. He was the officer commanding the ship's complement of Marines on board HMS Caesar during the Battle of Cape Ortegal in November 1805; the concluding action of the Trafalgar Campaign.

He first distinguished himself on shore while a Captain of Marines on HMS Hibernia, at the start of the Peninsular War. In July 1808, he disembarked at Figueira da Foz in the mouth of the Mondego River in command of a Marine detachment from the squadron, of upwards of 300 marines, in order to counter the French and to support the Portuguese.

He was present with several companies of Marines in the Netherlands from November 1813 to February 1814. This force was to become the third raiding Battalion; a precursor to the Marine Commandos of the 20th century. As the officer commanding this battalion, he prepared the battalion for deployment to North America, and accompanied them.

During the War of 1812, he participated in the Chesapeake campaign, and was present at the battles of Bladensburg and Baltimore, and the attack on Washington. Illness necessitated his departure from that theatre of war in November 1814.

Lewis became a brevet major and was appointed a Companion of the Order of the Bath, following his return to England in 1815. Further promotions followed, he became lieutenant colonel and 2nd Commandant and was promoted to Colonel Commandant of the Portsmouth Division on 10 July 1837, vice Colonel Commandant Harry Percival Lewis, retired. Hart's 1850 Annual Army List shows George Lewis as a major general on the Army list, having retired from the Royal Marines as a Colonel Commandant with full pay status.

He died in Stonehouse, Plymouth on 14 September 1854. The December 1854 edition of The Gentleman's Magazine carried a brief obituary.

== Military promotions and distinctions ==
- Second lieutenant – H.M. Marine Forces, appointed on 23 April 1793
- First lieutenant – H.M. Marine Forces, 6 October 1794
- Captain – H.M. Marine Forces, 1 October 1801
  - Brevet major – (Army List), 6 June 1813
- Companion of the Order of the Bath, 2 January 1815
- Lieutenant colonel – Royal Marines, 28 September 1826
- "Lieutenant Colonel and Second Commandant" (Note: The rank of LtCol & 2nd Cmdt, RM, was abolished, together with the rank of major, of the Royal Marines in 1837. The "Lieutenant Colonels and Second Commandants" of 1832–37 became "Colonels and Second Commandants" after 1837, while senior captains became eligible for promotion to lieutenant colonel in the Royal Marines.) – Royal Marines, 16 April 1832
- Colonel commandant – Royal Marines, 10 July 1837
  - Major general – (Army List), 9 November 1846
  - Lieutenant general – (Army List), 20 June 1854

== See also ==
- Corps of Colonial Marines
