= Corps of Colonial Marines =

Royal Marine units consisting of former slaves

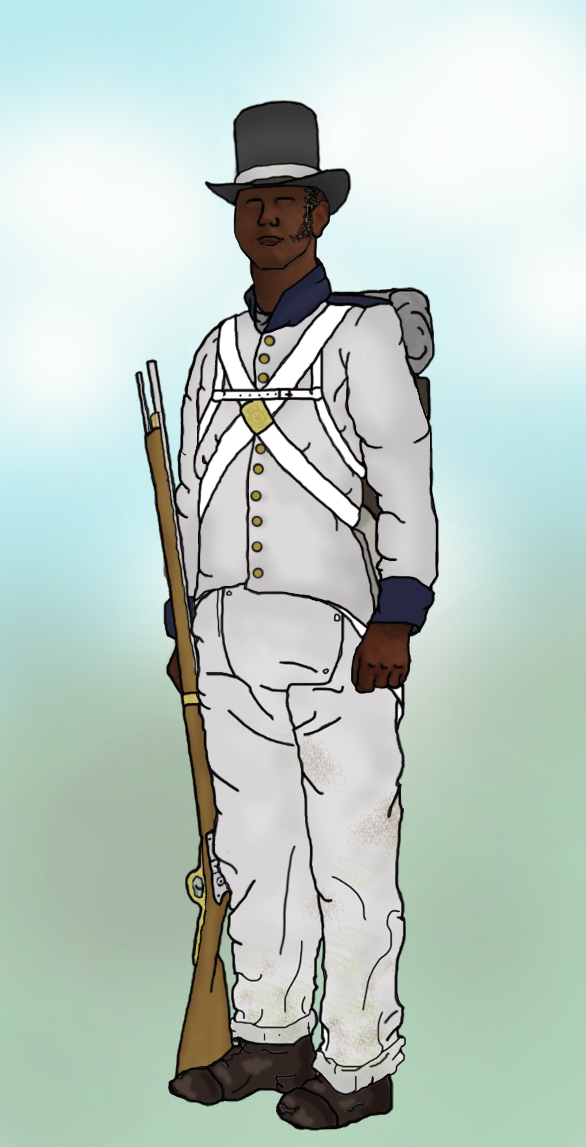
- A British Colonial Marine in a light coloured fatigue uniform, worn for performing ordinary duties and a common sight at the Marie-Galante garrison circa 1810. In contrast, on the battlefields during the War of 1812, the red coat of the service uniform would have been worn
- Active: First Corps: 1808–1815; Second Corps: 18 May 1814 – 20 August 1816
- Country: United Kingdom
- Branch: Royal Marines
- Type: Marines
- Size: First Corps:Company; Second Corps:Battalion
- Garrison/HQ: First Corps: Guadeloupe; Second Corps: Tangier Island/Cumberland Island; Negro Fort Royal Naval Dockyard, Bermuda
- Patron: Sir Alexander Cochrane
- Engagements: First Corps: Napoleonic Wars: Battle of Marie Galante (1808); Battle of Guadeloupe (1808); Second Corps: War of 1812: Battle of Bladensburg (1814); Burning of Washington (1814); Battle of North Point (1814); Battle of Fort Peter (1815)

Commanders
- Notable commanders: Second Corps: Major George Lewis

The Corps of Colonial Marines were two different Royal Marine units raised from former black slaves for service in the Americas at the behest of Alexander Cochrane. The units were created at two separate periods: 1808-1810 during the Napoleonic Wars; and then again during the War of 1812; both units being disbanded once the military threat had passed. Apart from being created in each case by Cochrane, they had no connection with each other.

The first Corps was a small unit that served in the Caribbean from 1808 to 12 October 1810, recruited from former slaves to address the shortage of military manpower in the Caribbean. The locally recruited men were less susceptible to tropical illnesses than were troops sent from Britain. The Corps followed the practice of the British Army's West India Regiments in recruiting former slaves as soldiers. In the previous year, the Mutiny Act 1807 emancipated all slaves in the British Army and, as a result, subsequently enlisted slaves were considered free on enlistment.

The second, more substantial, Corps served from 18 May 1814 until 20 August 1816. The greater part of the Corps was stationed at St. Augustine on the Atlantic coast, with a smaller body occupying the future Negro Fort, on the Apalachicola River in remote northwest Florida. Recruits were accepted from among escaped slaves who had already gained their freedom on coming into British hands and who were unwilling to join West India Regiments. (Note: Letter from Sir James Cockburn on the subject of the Colonial Marines mentions the 'strong & determined prejudices of these men against the West Indian corps, & the high ideas of superiority which they attach to themselves over the African negroes who chiefly compose those regiments; with whom, I am assured, no inducement could probably tempt them to indiscriminately mix & enlist themselves in the same corps') The establishment of the force sparked controversy at the time, as the arming of former slaves was a psychological as well as military threat to the slave-owning society of the United States. As a consequence, the two senior officers of the Corps in Florida, George Woodbine and Edward Nicolls, were demonised by Americans such as Hezekiah Niles in his Baltimore publication, the Weekly Register for their association with the Corps and inducing slave revolt.

At the end of the War of 1812, as the British post in Florida was evacuated, the Corps' Florida detachment was paid off and disbanded. Although several men accompanied the British to Bermuda, which United States independence had elevated to an Imperial fortress colony, the majority continued to live in settlements around the fort the Corps had garrisoned. This legacy of a community of armed fugitive slaves with a substantial arsenal was unacceptable to the United States of America. After the Fort was destroyed in the Battle of Negro Fort of 1816, the former Marines joined the southward migration of Seminoles and African Americans escaping the American advance. Members of the Colonial Marine battalion who were deployed on the Atlantic coast withdrew from American territory. They continued in British service as garrison-in-residence at Bermuda until 1816, when the unit was disbanded and the ex-Marines resettled on Trinidad.

== First Corps ==
In 1808, British forces captured the French-held island of Marie-Galante as part of the Caribbean campaign of 1803–1810. However, the governor of Guadeloupe, Jean Augustin Ernouf, ordered an attack against the island after hearing that disease had weakened the British garrison there. Black slaves in Marie-Galante agreed to assist the British in exchange for their freedom, and the French attack was repulsed. Shortly afterwards, three companies of the 1st West India Regiment arrived at Marie-Galante to reinforce the British garrison. Upon hearing of the former slaves' service, Rear-admiral Sir Alexander Cochrane, the commander-in-chief of the Royal Navy's Leeward Islands Station, organised them into the first Corps of Colonial Marines in the same year.

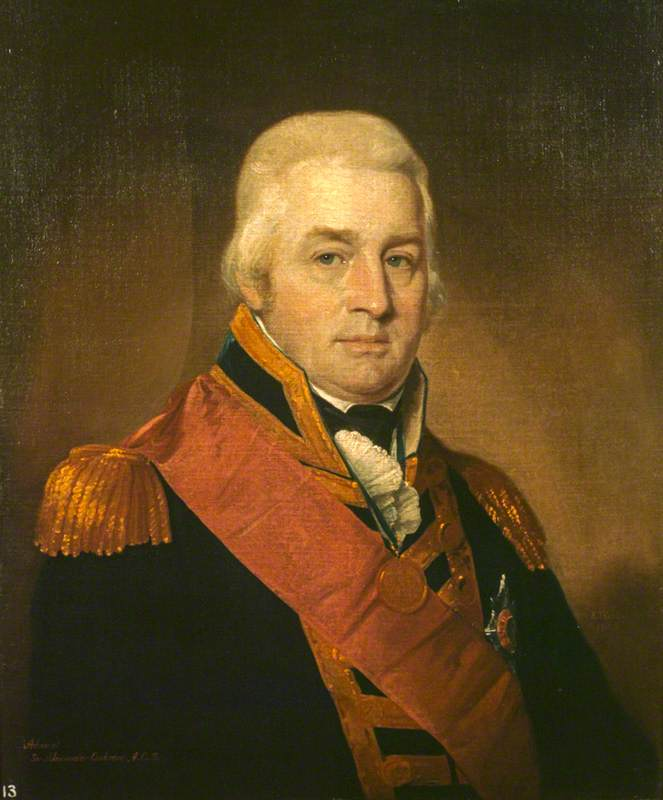
Alexander Cochrane, responsible for raising the Corps of Colonial Marines

The unit, which was personally named by Cochrane, was paid using revenues generated from Marie-Galante, clothed from Royal Navy stores and commanded by Royal Marine officers. Its ranks were soon was enlarged with fugitive slaves from Guadeloupe. Following the British capture of Guadeloupe in 1810, Cochrane maintained the Corps, and on 12 October 1810 redistributed its men: 70 were distributed among the ships of his squadron, 20 to 30 were sent to the British battery at the Îles des Saintes and 50 were ordered to remain in the Marie-Galante garrison. The unit saw no further action as a distinct body, but were listed in ships' musters among supernumeraries for wages and victuals under the description "Colonial Marine" until mid-1815.

== Second Corps ==
Cochrane, by now a vice admiral, assumed his position as commander-in-chief of British forces on the North Atlantic station in April 1814 and ordered the recruitment of a body of Colonial Marines as he had done six years earlier on Marie Galante. Rear Admiral George Cockburn, Cochrane's second-in-command on the Atlantic coast, implemented Cochrane's order recruiting the second Corps of Colonial Marines. It served as part of the British forces on the Atlantic and Gulf coasts of the United States during the War of 1812.

On 2 April 1814, Cochrane issued a proclamation to all persons wishing to emigrate. Any persons would be received by the British, either at a military outpost or aboard British ships; those seeking sanctuary could enter His Majesty's forces, or go "as free settlers to the British possessions in North America or the West Indies". An historical precedent was Dunmore's Proclamation of 7 November 1775, although this offered freedom only to those who bore arms with British forces.

=== Recruitment and Atlantic coast service ===
By 10 May, Tangier Island off the Virginia coast had been occupied by the British and offered an accessible location for those seeking refuge. Male refugees were given the option "to become blue Jackets, take up arms or [to] join the working party" constructing Fort Albion and its infrastructure. The Corps was embodied on 18 May 1814 and made its combat debut in the raid on Pungoteague Creek on 30 May 1814 where, in a skirmish known as the Battle of Rumley's Gut, it helped capture an American artillery battery. James Ross, captain of HMS Albion, later described their involvement as "a most excellent specimen of what they are likely to be. Their conduct was marked by great spirit and vivacity, and perfect obedience". One, a soldier named Michael Harding, was killed early in the battle but "it did not daunt or check the others, but on the contrary animated them to seek revenge". Cockburn's initial impressions were positive; he observed that the new recruits were "getting on astonishingly" and were "really fine fellows". After this, the Corps participated in the Chesapeake campaign; in subsequent correspondence, Cockburn wrote that the recruits had behaved "unexpectedly well" in several engagements and had not committed any "improper outrages".

Members of the Corps served alongside their shipborne Royal Marine counterparts from the Cockburn Chesapeake squadron (HM Ships Albion, Dragon, Loire, Jasseur and the schooner HMS St Lawrence), participating in a series of raids. After the British failed to destroy the American Chesapeake Bay Flotilla at the Battle of St. Jerome Creek, they conducted coastal raids on the towns of Calverton, Huntingtown, Prince Frederick, Benedict and Lower Marlborough. On 15 June 1814, a force of 30 Colonial Marines accompanied 180 Royal Marines in 12 boats in a raid on Benedict. Nine days later, on 24 June, a force of Colonial and 180 Royal Marines attacked an artillery battery at Chesconessex Creek (although this failed to prevent the escape of the Chesapeake Bay Flotilla, which left St. Leonard's Creek two days later).

The arrival on 19 July of a battalion of Royal Marines, which had left Bermuda on 30 June, enabled the squadron to mount further expeditions ashore. After a series of diversionary raids, the Marines were again landed at Benedict on 19 August accompanied by recently arrived Peninsular War army veterans. The battalion was to accompany the Colonial Marines in attacks on Bladensburg and Washington in August 1814. A company fought at the Battle of Bladensburg, and the other two companies took part in the burning of Washington. One of the firing parties was led by Second Lieutenant Lewis Agassiz (1793–1866); for his part in the battle, his family was later granted a coat of arms depicting a torch. Casualties suffered by the Colonial Marines during this action were one man killed and three wounded.

On 3 September 1814, three companies of the Colonial Marines joined with three remaining companies of Royal Marines to form the 3rd Battalion, Royal and Colonial Marines. Later that month, all three companies fought at the Battle of North Point in Maryland. A fourth company was created in December 1814, and further recruitment was begun along the Georgia coast during the first quarter of 1815. The number of enlistments allowed two more companies to be raised, with sergeants taken from companies recruited in the Chesapeake.

Although the Corps suffered some combat losses during its Chesapeake campaign actions in 1814, its greatest losses arose from disease due to poor conditions on Tangier Island. An outbreak of dysentery in the winter of 1814 killed the surgeon and 69 men from the battalion. The strength of the corps is mentioned as having risen to about 200 men whilst on Tangier Island in the autumn. The Corps' last tour during the War of 1812 was in Georgia from December to March 1815. Admiral George Cockburn seized the southern U.S coast to disrupt trade, communication, and transportation of troops to the Gulf of Mexico, where Admiral Cochrane's forces planned to take the southwestern territories of the U.S. Part of the Corps joined the successful British attack on Fort Point Peter. The corps occupied Camden County and Cumberland Island, aiding the emigration of an estimated 1,700 slaves from southeast Georgia.

=== Recruitment and Gulf coast service ===
In addition to British outposts on the Atlantic coast at Tangier Island (Virginia) and Cumberland Island (Georgia), there was a similar outpost on the Gulf coast at Prospect Bluff on the Apalachicola River in Spanish East Florida which attracted Redstick Creek Indians and Black Seminoles. George Woodbine and a detachment of Royal Marines were landed by Hugh Pigot from HMS Orpheus in May 1814 with gifts, two thousand muskets and blankets for the Indians. A fort was constructed, and Cochrane sent Edward Nicolls to oversee the operations at Prospect Bluff. (Note: Enclosure 60 to Erving. Ambrister's Commission from Cochrane. 'Whereas, I have thought fit to send a Detachment of the Royal Marine Corps to the Creek Nations, for the purpose of training to arms, such Indians and others as may be friendly to, and willing to fight under, the Standard of His Majesty: I ..appoint you as an Auxiliary Second Lieutenant, of such Corps of Colonial Marines ... Given under my hand and seal, at Bermuda, this 25th day of July, 1814')

Nicolls left Bermuda with 112 Royal Marines, 3 field pieces, 300 uniforms and 1,000 muskets for recruits to his corps. On 26 August 1814 Nicolls issued his "order of the day" for his "battalion" It remains uncertain how many men Nicolls had under his command at that time, since muster and pay records have not been found. More escaped slaves were recruited in Pensacola (to the chagrin of the Spanish), but they were forced to return to Prospect Bluff in November after the American capture of Pensacola. Three companies had been formed in November 1814, Nicolls mentioned in his correspondence to Cochrane that his third company was 85 strong. A fourth company of Colonial Marines was being formed, this fact being reported to Cochrane on 22 December 1814.

Between December 1814 and January 1815, Nicolls was away, with Robert Henry acting as deputy. The first Spanish delegation, headed by Lieutenant Urcullo arrived at Prospect Bluff, requesting the return of the fugitive Spanish slaves, some serving in the Corps, and of the 200 Spanish troops that were embarked upon the evacuation of Fort Barrancas that November. Henry dismissed Urcullo, stating that it was Nicolls, not himself, who knew which fugitives were Spanish. Robert Henry's communication to Governor Manrique, dated 12 January, also puts forward the argument that the armed men of the Corps of Colonial Marines outnumbered their European counterparts by a ratio of five to one. On that basis the fugitive slaves could not be returned by force to the Spanish. Urcullo concurred, and mentioned this in his report to Manrique dated 23 January 1815.

The start of 1815 was to have seen a British offensive in the south, with the Royal Marine Battalions to advance westward into Georgia, to be joined by Nicolls and his forces from the Gulf Coast advancing northward. (Note: 'Intended route of operations by the Detachment and Indians under Major Nicolls' dated 6 January 1815, fron Nicolls to Cochrane) These plans were overtaken by events, as peace was declared following the conclusion of the Treaty of Ghent. With the offensive cancelled, Nicolls and his men returned to Prospect Bluff. On 10 March 1815, Nicolls, a champion of Native American rights, created a treaty on his own initiative, without authorisation, at Nicolls' Outpost on the Florida-Georgia border, 60 miles north of Prospect Bluff. Upon returning to Prospect Bluff, a second Spanish delegation had arrived, seeking the return of the fugitive Spanish slaves. When they first arrived at Apalachicola on 7 March, they learned that Nicolls was still away in Georgia. When Nicolls replied to Hawkins on 28 April, he mentioned that he was absent when the preceding letter, dated 19 March, arrived at Prospect Bluff.

== Post-war developments ==
=== Atlantic coast detachment ===
It is claimed by Elizabeth Lutes Hillman that many of these men were resold into slavery in the West Indies, and that the British reneged their promise of liberty. Joseph McCarthy states that some British critics alleged that some were sold into slavery in the West Indies. James Scanlon notes that during the Chesapeake campaign, Virginians believed some slaves were being sold as indentured labourers by the British. Similar statements were published in Niles' Weekly Register in 1814. (Note: 'It is known that a shameful traffic has been carried on in the West Indies, by the sale of those persons there, by those who professed to be their deliverers.' 'They carried away many negroes, doubtless for sale in the West Indies - But "religious" England has abolished the slave trade!") This is countered by Malcomson, as a British investigation into this American claim was proven false in 1815. The historian Alan Taylor notes that such false claims stemmed from delusions of the American planter class, who for the most part genuinely believed that their slaves were content with enslavement and were shocked to see even well-treated slaves escape to the British.. From a nominal roll of 410 men of the Colonial Marines in August 1816, it has been possible to determine their former slave owner (Note: Those individuals listed as "claimants" for compensation, as documented within American State Papers Volume 5.), their escape date, and their enlistment date. (Note: Appendix - Corps of Colonial Marines, personnel in August 1816)

In March 1815 two American commissioners, Thomas Newell and Thomas Spalding, visited the British outpost on Cumberland Island, whose garrison was under Cockburn's command. The two men negotiated with Cockburn in an attempt to have the fugitive slaves who had escaped to the British be returned to their American owners. The negotiations were frustrated by Cockburn's refusal to hand over British military personnel to the Americans knowing that they would then be re-enslaved. However, Paul Harris Nicolas, a contemporary Royal Marines officer and historian, wrote in 1845 that in order to maintain the peace a few Georgian slaves who had fled to the British and joined the Colonial Marines were returned to the commissioners. Though Nicolas noted only a few were handed over, he condemned the decision to do so as a stain on Britain's national honour and argued that monetary compensation should have been given to the commissioners instead. Up to four Colonial Marines were affected.

They and the rest of the battalion were transported to Bermuda in March 1815.

In May 1815 Spalding visited Bermuda and demanded that the Governor of Bermuda repatriate the Colonial Marines to America. The governor lost his temper with Spalding. Spalding was allowed to try and convince them to return to a life of slavery, and several did go back with him.

=== Gulf coast detachment ===
In January 1815, Florida governor Mateo González Manrique requested Cochrane return the runaway Spanish-owned slaves. Rear Admiral Pulteney Malcolm, Cochrane's subordinate, informed Manrique that Post-captain Robert Cavendish Spencer had been ordered conduct a enquiry into property losses suffered by Spanish subjects in Florida. (Spencer's letter to Rear Admiral Malcolm, dated 13 March 1815 stated that 'all persuasive means of getting them back [to their slaveowners] have been tried and have failed'.) Malcolm further stated that in cases where formerly enslaved persons could not be persuaded to return to their owners, Britain would compensate the latter. The Spanish official Vicente Sebastián Pintado arrived at Prospect Bluff on 7 April, Spencer having arrived earlier. (Note: Enclosure 8 to Erving. Memorandum of a gentleman of respectability at Bermuda, dated 21 May 1815 "Admiral Cochrane, however, appears to have disapproved of Nicholls's conduct in affording protection to the Spanish slaves, and had sent the Hon. Captain Spencer to Pensacola for the purpose of making arrangements for their restoration; who accordingly proceeded to Appalachicola, with Captain Pintado, named commissioner on the part of the Spaniards.") Spencer informed Pintado that he would not return the runaway Spanish slaves by force. In the presence of Pintado, they discharged several enlisted men of the Colonial Marines, settled outstanding accrued pay, and presented each man with a discharge paper. (Note: They disarmed and discharged them from their service, several of them in my presence, and they were paid their money as marines) Pintado was angered by what he considered to be manumission documents, coupled with the refusal to forcibly return these men to slavery. (Note: Owsley notes 'When the British finally evacuated Apalachicola, a number of these blacks chose to go with them... Many of them chose to remain near the fort at Prospect Bluff.' Their "choice" in the matter was limited, given limited space in the transport ships.) Pintado's report states that Spencer told the Spanish fugitives that they could not be transported to British territory, (Note: [Spencer] solemnly declared that, under no circumstances, were [Spanish fugitive slaves] to board English ships) (Note: 'The British had no right to harbor slaves who came from Florida... since Cochrane’s original proclamation only offered freedom to fugitive slaves from the United States.') and warned them that he foresaw future vengeful behaviour on the part of the Americans. Pintado interviewed 128 Spanish slaves, he was able to persuade only 10, all women, to return voluntarily. He estimated 250 runaways to be present. Nicolls was adamant that the American fugitives could be freed, reported Pintado. (Note: 'They were to be taken to the English colonies and settled there as free men, in accordance with the Cochrane proclamation of 2 April 1814.')

The detachment in Florida, which had grown to about 400 men, (Note: Enclosure 6b to Erving. The testimony of a Royal Marine deserter from the Fort, sworn at Mobile on 9 May 1815, advising "the British left, with the Indians, between them three and four hundred negroes, taken from the United States, principally Louisiana) (Note: Enclosure 7 to Erving. Letter from General Gaines dated 22 May 1815 "P.S. I learn that Nicholls[sic] ..is still at Appalachicola, and that he has 900 Indians and 450 negroes under arms) (Note: In his report to Manrique dated 23 January 1815, Urcullo concurred that the 'Negros under command amount to 500 men all armed.') (Note: Whilst deputising in Nicolls's absence, Robert Henry stated 'there was 5 Black men to 1 white Man under his command at the time.') was paid off and disbanded when the British post was evacuated at the end of the war. (Note: LeRoy Perdue of the Island of New Providence, shoemaker, being duly sworn maketh Oath and saith that he this Deponent did in the month of August one thousand eight hundred and fourteen in Pensacola enlist... and was discharged in the month of March last on account of Peace, and did embark at Appalachicola on the same day [in May 1815] (on board the Transport Britannia) that Captain Woodbine did also embark on board the Transport Mars... Signed, L Perdue, Sworn before me this 17th day of October 1815, Signed, Thomas Matthews) A small number of men went to Bermuda with the British as part of a refugee group, rejoining the main body of Colonial Marines. (Note: Within Enclosure 8 to Erving. Memorandum of a gentleman of respectability at Bermuda, dated 21 May 1815 "a few that were shipped to the island of Trinidad, in His Majesty's Ship, The Levant; and such as have enlisted in the Colonial Marines.") Over 200 were disembarked in Trinidad during 1815. (Note: Enclosure 8 to Erving. Memorandum of a gentleman of respectability at Bermuda, dated 21 May 1815 "I have since learned, that the Carron... is arrived at Nassau, on here way to Bermuda, with 176 slaves, of all ages... The People expected in the Carron, who are from Louisiana and West Florida, are also to be sent to Trinidad.") (Note: 'The initial Merikins arrived in Trinidad on May 27, 1815 (88 on the HMS Levant) and July 5, 1815 (and 58 on the HMS Carron)... November 27, 1815 [saw the] arrival of [the third group, via HMS Carron again, of] 65 ... The fourth and largest group of settlers arrived on August 20, 1816 with 411 men.') The transport ship Mars was tasked to embark 'as many of the Black Corps as they can conveniently stowe.' (Note: COL. NICOLLS:-It appears that this great man has left the Floridas for Bermuda, in the gun-brig Forward, accompanied by captain Woodbine; an indian chief and about 50 slave troops.) (Note: 27 Colonial Marines disembarked the transports Mars & Britannia on 29 June 1815, and were accommodated aboard HMS Ruby. They were accompanied by seven Colonial Marines who disembarked HMS Forward on 28 June 1815.) Nicolls estimated 350 remained. (At the time of his departure in May 1815, Nicolls promised his allies to return in six months, according to Hawkins.)

Others from the Florida unit remained in settlements around the Fort which had become a symbol of slave insurrection. Southern plantation owners considered the presence of a group of armed fugitive slaves, even in a remote and sparsely populated area of Spanish Florida, an unacceptable danger; this led, under the leadership of General Andrew Jackson, to the Battle of Negro Fort in July 1816 and the beginning of the First Seminole War. For their involvement in the conflict, two former auxiliary officers of the corps were executed in 1818 in what became known as the Arbuthnot and Ambrister incident. Former Colonial Marine refugees were among a group that escaped to the Bahamas in 1822 and founded, on the west coast of the island of Andros, Nicholls Town [sic], a community that retains its identity to the present day.

=== Bermuda ===
The war ended in February 1815, and the three European companies of the 3rd Battalion, Royal and Colonial Marines were sent back to Britain. With their departure, the battalion was reformed as the 3rd Battalion, Colonial Marines, consisting of six companies of Colonial Marines and a staff company of Royal Marines. Initially, they and their families were accommodated aboard the hulk Ardent, formerly in use as a floating prison.

The Admiralty wished to eliminate expenditure on the corps, it being under pressure to reduce its expenditure in peacetime. It was considered useful for the duration of hostilities, but was now out of its remit. The Bermuda Assembly had expressed to the Governor of Bermuda, Sir James Cockburn, 9th Baronet, their reluctance at this new armed black presence in the dockyard.

Vice Admiral Cochrane continued to lobby for the men of the corps to be retained on Bermuda. In a communication with the Secretary of the Admiralty, he stated 'they were infinitely more dreaded by the Americans than the British Troops.' Whereas the troops of the West India Regiment has struggled with the winter climates in Louisiana and Georgia during the war, 'the men of this Battalion are habituated to both hot and cold weather.' In the past, he had been criticised for the manner in which captured slaves had been placed on his plantation in Trinidad. It was important for his public reputation to avoid this being brought up again.

It was proposed that the men be transferred to the army, to form a battalion of the West India Regiment. The plan was considered plausible, until it was learned that Nicolls's detachment has been disbanded. (Note: 'Admiral Sir Alexander Cochrane has mistaked our numbers from an expectation that between two and three hundred men would have joined us from Major Nicolls, but he enlisted his men to serve during the American War only with a promise of land and protection at its termination, and they are all discharged.') These, in conjunction with the men already on the island, would have brought the overall unit strength up to 800, and close to the required strength of 1000 for a single-battalion regiment.

At the same time, this concept was unpopular with the men, who had disliked serving alongside the "slave" regiments, and were reported to be disdainful of any connection with these units. Such aversion towards these units was noted by both Commodore Evans and Major Kinsman, the Commissioner of the Navy at Bermuda and commanding officer of the battalion respectively. Even during the war, the British Army was unsuccessful in recruiting fugitives to what they saw as a slave army staffed by Africans. (Only eight joined the regiments from the Chesapeake Bay area in 1814, and a further thirteen on the coast of Georgia early in 1815, the great majority of refugees who offered military service preferring the Corps of Colonial Marines.)

On 24 May 1815, it was proposed by the Under-Secretary of State for War and the Colonies they would become the Bermudian Rangers, in an effort to distance the formation from the West Indian Regiment, although Henry Goulburn's proposal flew in the face of the men's continued disdain for these "slave" regiments. Nonetheless, orders were issued in July whereby the proposed transfer would go ahead. Governor Cockburn viewed the transfer as seriously flawed, given that it failed to consider the feelings of the men. In his response, Commodore Evans intimated there would be 'an almost total cessation of work on Ireland Island' if they were no longer around.

On 23 August 1815, Governor Cockburn responded to Goulburn, disagreeing with this proposal. He suggested they should be under the direct control of Commodore Evans. Bathurst responded that the men should be consulted. They should be given a choice between simple disbandment, or being settled on Trinidad. Cockburn's response dated 10 February 1816 advised the men had unanimously decided to be settled in Trinidad. Bathurst's reply, and authority to proceed, were sent on 9 May 1816.

The 3rd Battalion performed garrison duty at the Royal Naval Dockyard, Bermuda before being sent to Trinidad, embarking on 15 July 1816 aboard the transport ships Lord Eldon and Mary & Dorothy. Following their arrival on 16 August, the battalion was disbanded on 20 August 1816 and formed a community of subsistence farmers with their families, under the supervision of their former non-commissioned officers, becoming known as the Merikins. Each household was given a plot of 16-acre (6.5 ha), and in 1847 their ownership was formally recognised. The Merikins maintain their distinctive identity and continue to commemorate their roots in an annual celebration.

== See also ==
- Merikins
- West India Regiment

== Notes ==
Footnotes
