= Royal Marines Battalions (Napoleonic Wars) =

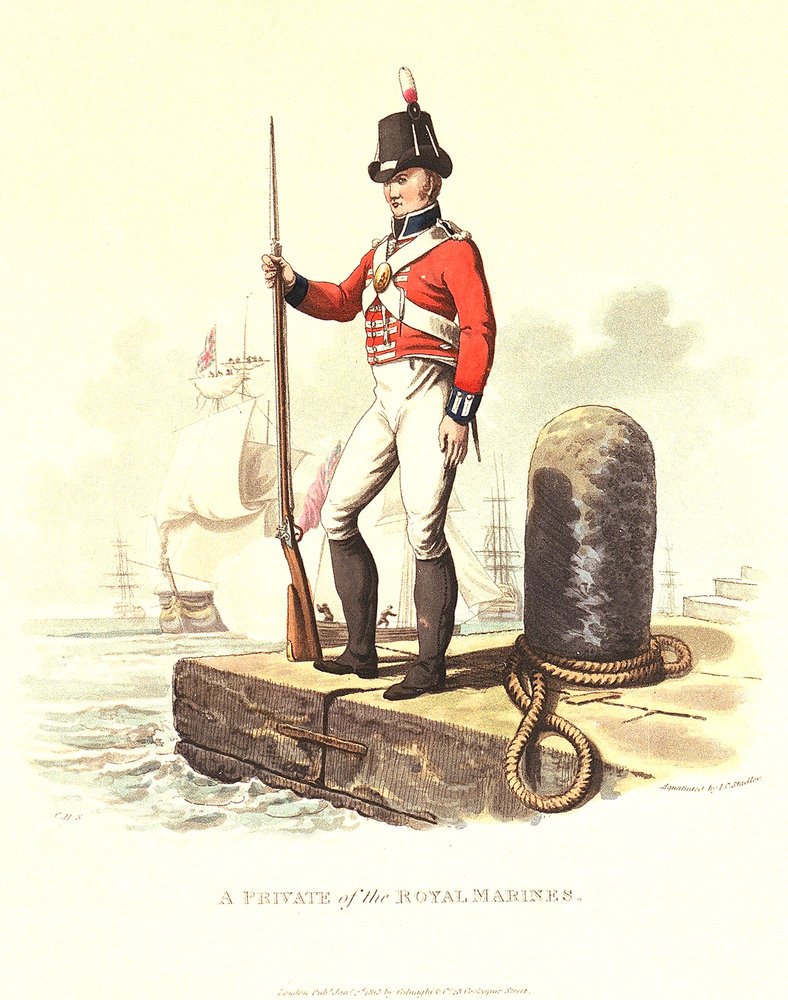
- A private of the Royal Marines, 1815
- Active: 1810–1815
- Country: United Kingdom
- Branch: Royal Marines
- Role: Naval Infantry
- Engagements: Napoleonic Wars; War of 1812

Three battalions were raised from among the Royal Marines during the Napoleonic Wars, seeing combat in Northern Spain, the Netherlands and North America. The first and second battalions were disbanded in Portsmouth. Several men of the 3rd Battalion were transported from Bermuda, and were discharged. The third battalion existed until the quandary of what to do with the Corps of Colonial Marines was resolved in 1816.

== The First Battalion ==
The 1st battalion formed at Plymouth on 29 November 1810 under the command of Major Richard Williams. It consisted of six companies, plus an attached company of Royal Marine Artillery. It embarked, arriving in Lisbon on 8 December 1810.

The battalion grew to eight companies, plus the attached artillery company. It left Portugal in February 1812, and disembarked at Portsmouth. There it remained until 6 June 1812, when it embarked aboard HMS Diadem. The battalion arrived off the coast near Santoña on 15 June, and was involved in the attack on the fort at Castro Urdiales. The fort's garrison of two companies of infantry capitulated on 8 July, the French having evacuated the town the day before. On 10 July, the battalion re-embarked, intending to go to Portugalete, but returned to Castro shortly afterwards. The French, unawares that the marines had returned, launched an unsuccessful counter-attack against the fort's Bilbao gate. Major Williams was appointed commander of the fort on 30 July.

The Royal Navy attacked Santander from 30 July onwards, with the French evacuating the town on 3 August. The first six companies of the 1st battalion embarked for Santander to support the attack and arrived on 4 August. This force re-embarked on 10 August for an intended attack on Gitaya, its destination changing to Portugalete, where it arrived on 12 August. After the marines had destroyed a fort that the French had abandoned, the marines re-embarked and returned to Santander.

The force disembarked at Zumaia on 18 August, along with the 2nd battalion. The artillery companies of both battalions deployed opposite the rock of Gitaya. Both battalions held the area until ordered to re-embark on 20 September.

During October, the 1st battalion was deployed before Santoña, at Castello. The news that a French division was approaching to reinforce the 1,500 men garrison at Santoña led to the recall of the battalion on 1 November. However, the recall was countermanded and the battalion resumed its positions; it returned to Santander on 14 December.

On 21 December the 1st battalion, which numbered 536 rank and file, and its artillery company sailed from Santander in HMS Fox, HMS Latona, and HMS Venerable, arriving at St Helens, Isle of Wight on 31 December. The right wing (aboard Fox and Venerable) received orders to proceed to Plymouth on 6 January 1813, where the battalion was to perform garrison duty at Plymouth and to prepare for imminent deployment to North America.

The 1st Battalion embarked (on the ships Diadem (1st to 5th companies) and Diomede (6th to 8th companies and artillery) on 30 March, set sail on 7 April, and arrived in Bermuda on 29 May 1813. There it and the infantry already present were formed into two brigades. The embarked artillery brigade, supporting both battalions, comprised 131 officers and men, four 6-pounder guns, two 8" howitzers, two 5.5" howitzers, two 10" mortars, and a quantity of Congreve rocket launching frames, with associated munitions, all under the command of Captain Thomas Parke.

On 25 June, the 1st Battalion participated in the attack on Hampton, Virginia. On 13 July, the Marine Battalions were involved in the occupation of Ocracoake and Portsmouth, and engaged in the occupation of Kent Island on 7 August. Later in the year, the 1st Battalion went to Ile aux Noix, south of Montreal in Canada, while the 2nd Battalion went to Prescott, on the Saint Lawrence River.

A detachment of the 1st Battalion, under Lieutenants Caldwell and Barton, was present at the Battle of Lacolle Mills (1814). On 16 August 1814, the battalion received orders to be "disposed for Naval service", with the greater part of the battalion to go to Lake Ontario and the remainder to go to Lake Champlain. In November 1814 the First Battalion was reconstituted in Quebec, and shipped south in support of operations off the coast of Georgia.

The battalion was disbanded at Portsmouth in July 1815.

== The Second Battalion ==
=== July 1812 to May 1814 ===
The Second Battalion was formed at Chatham, and deployed to Portsmouth in July 1812. It consisted of six companies under the command of Major James Malcolm. On 15 August, the battalion embarked aboard Latona (1st and 2nd companies) and Fox (3rd to 6th companies), to deploy in Northern Spain under the command of the squadron of Home Riggs Popham. The battalion disembarked at Zumaia on 18 August, and joined up with Spanish forces under the command of Francisco de Longa. The battalion re-embarked on 20 September, and were landed at Santander on 28 September.

Further reinforcements for the battalion disembarked soon after Diadem arrived on 29 November at Santander, (Note: The HMS Diadem Ship Muster shows entries 3790 to 4119 were for reinforcements embarked, of whom 94 marines had come via HMS Puissant, the remainder via HMS Nemesis.) resulting in two companies being added and another company of artillery being formed. Some of the reinforcements had returned from garrison duty on the island of Anholt, Denmark.

On 21 December the 2nd battalion sailed from Santander, along with the left wing of the 1st battalion, aboard Latona, arriving in Cawsand Bay on 4 January. Diadem carried the 1st, 2nd, 7th, 8th & 10th companies, HMS Iris carried the 2nd Battalion's artillery company (Captain Parke) and supplemental company (Captain Wilkinson), (Note: The HMS Iris Ship Muster shows entries 999 to 1103 were for embarked Marines.) with the remainder of the battalion (5 companies) embarked upon the transports Whitton and Mariner, leaving the town to Spanish forces commanded by General Mendizabal. (Note: Whitton appeared in Lloyd's Register (LR), as Whyton, of 370 tons (bm), launched at Hull in 1813. Her master and owner was Collinson, and her trade was London transport. She foundered on 28 January 1815 whilst on a voyage from Lisbon, Portugal to Bristol. All aboard were saved.) The surviving muster lists show the Marines disembarked at Plymouth on 7 January 1813.

The deployment of both battalions in Northern Spain forced the French to redeploy 30,000 men, away from the Salamanca campaign. The Duke of Wellington was so impressed that he requested they would be placed under his command, but was rebuffed by the Admiralty.

Given the heterogeneous nature of the battalion, and its deployment in Spain immediately after inception, Major Malcolm felt that the 2nd Battalion was lacking in discipline. He requested that the 2nd Battalion be deployed to the barracks at Berry Head Fort in Torbay, so that drilling of the unit would result in better discipline and cohesion. The 2nd Battalion was dispatched to Berry Head on 14 January aboard HMS Diadem and HMS Latona, having boarded on 12 January. Within a month of the battalion's arrival in Berry Head Fort, the intensive drill bore fruit.

The 2nd Battalion embarked on the ships HMS Romulus, (Note: HMS Romulus Ship Muster refers to 1st, 7th and 8th companies and 35 artillerymen.) HMS Diomede, (Note: HMS Diomede Ship Muster shows 5th and 6th Companies boarded on 30 March, having been on HMS Fox.) HMS Nemesis, (Note: HMS Nemesis Ship Muster shows entries 688 to 780 were for embarked Marines. There is no mention of their unit but 1st Lt Ch Pratt and 1st Lt Harrison are the two Marine officers present.) and HMS Fox on 30 March, set sail on 7 April with the ships carrying the 1st Battalion, the transport vessel Mariner (containing two rocket detachments with an establishment of 25 men, each commanded by a Lieutenant) and HMS Superb (which was carrying troops of the 8th Royal Veteran Battalion) and arrived in Bermuda on 29 May, where the Marines and the Royal Veterans, with the two Independent Companies of Foreigners already present upon the island, were formed into two brigades.

The 2nd Battalion was employed alongside the 1st Battalion until late in 1813, when the 2nd Battalion was deployed to Prescott, on the Saint Lawrence River. On 6 May 1814, it participated in the Battle of Fort Oswego (1814), suffering fatalities of one Captain, two Sergeants and four Other Ranks. Its final engagement was the Battle of Big Sandy Creek, where an element of the battalion made up part of the 180-man force. Thereafter, the battalion's companies were broken up and its men were dispersed among the squadron and flotilla on Lake Ontario, as per orders from Commodore James Lucas Yeo.

=== From May 1814 ===
Following the order, the 2nd Battalion ceased to exist as a fighting force. All that remained were the staff elements. When the 3rd Battalion arrived in Chesapeake, they were renumbered as the 2nd Battalion and came under Malcolm. Upon the orders of Vice Admiral Sir Alexander Cochrane, three of the ten companies were detached from this unit, to become the regenerated 3rd Battalion, under the command of Major Lewis. (These three companies were commanded by Captain Clements, Lt Connolly and Lt Stevens.)

The recreated 2nd Battalion was present in the Chesapeake campaign, participating in the Battle of Bladensburg, the attack on Washington, and the Battle of Baltimore. Also present during the campaign were the three companies of the Corps of Colonial Marines under the command of an army officer, Captain Reed (of the 6th West India Regiment), and a composite battalion of Marines, formed from ships' Marine detachments, frequently led by Captain John Robyns. A composite "battalion" of 100 men also took part in the Battle of New Orleans, under the command of Brevet Major Thomas Adair.

Following the failure of the British attack against Fort McHenry on 13 September, the 2nd and 3rd Marine battalions proceeded to Tangier Island, where a barracks for 600 men was created on the understanding they would be spending the winter on the island.

Orders were received on 11 December to embark, the Marines later disembarking on Cumberland Island on 10 January 1815, along with the 1st Battalion and two companies of the 2nd West India Regiment. Thereafter, this force attacked Fort Peter on 13 January, subsequently marching on the town of St. Marys, and occupying it for about a week, before retiring to Cumberland Island.

The artillery element of the 2nd Battalion participated in the Battle of New Orleans and the February 1815 attack on Fort Bowyer.

Ironically, the battalion's final action was a purely artillery engagement. The battalion's rocket detachment, commanded by Lieutenant John Lawrence, were on HMS Tonnant, and were put ashore on 7 February 1815, to participate in the attack on Fort Bowyer. Thereafter they returned to Portsmouth and were disembarked on 11 May 1815. The infantry companies were embarked aboard HMS Asia for the return to England in 1815. The artillery company was disembarked at Chatham on 20 May 1815.

== The Third Battalion ==
=== December 1813 to August 1814 ===
After Napoleon's defeat at Leipzig in October 1813, the French troops retreated to France. A provisional government was formed, the Triumvirate of 1813, which invited the exiled Prince William VI of Orange to The Hague.

A token British force accompanied the Prince of Orange to the Netherlands in November 1813. Most of the British army was fighting the Peninsular War, so the 2nd Battalion 2nd Foot Guards and several companies of Marines were hastily embarked at Deal. These companies were to form the nucleus of the 3rd Battalion. A further two companies of Marines arrived on 19 December, accompanied by Major George Lewis, who assumed command of the Marines.

This force was involved in fighting around Krabbendijke, until Russian troops relieved them on 18 January. When the marines arrived in Portsmouth on 21 January, they were formed into the Third Battalion. The battalion had an establishment of ten companies of 100 men, and one company of Royal Marine Artillery. The battalion was commanded by Major George Lewis, who since 19 December 1813 had been the officer commanding the Marine companies deployed in the Netherlands.

The Artillery company were issued with knapsacks just prior to their departure. The battalion embarked on 29 March, set sail on 7 April, and disembarked at Bermuda upon arrival on 9 June. The infantry companies were aboard HMS Regulus, HMS Melpomene and HMS Brune, with the artillery aboard HMS Tonnant. After a sojourn, the battalion sailed for the Chesapeake on 30 June, and joined Admiral Cockburn's squadron on 16 July. Just prior to the liaison, a detachment of 12 Royal Marine gunners (with two howitzers and a field piece) and 96 Royal Marine infantry were transferred to HMS Hermes and HMS Carron, to accompany Brevet Lieutenant Colonel Edward Nicolls to Florida, (Note: Captain Percy to Admiral Cochrane: 'I assented to re-embark the marines and proceed to that place; acquainting him [Nicolls] at the same time with my firm determination, in the event of not receiving a request from the Governor to land them, immediately to return to the anchorage off the Apalachicola, as I had promised the Captain-General, at the Havannah, not to land on Spanish territory without being requested to do so.' 'On the 21st August I left Apalachicola, and arrived at this anchorage on the 23rd; having fallen in with, off the bar, and brought with me sloop Sophie. I fortunately found that a letter from the governor had been sent to me, requiring the naval force might be brought down, as he was threatened with an attack by the Americans: on the next morning I waited on the governor, when he requested me to disembark the detachment, ammunition, &c. which I immediately complied with. The fort San Miguel, the only one near the town, was put into the hands of Lieutenant-Colonel Nicolls; and the British colours were hoisted in conjunction with the Spanish, which he informed me was done with the governor's approbation.') where they would remain for the duration of the war.

On the morning of 19 July, the battalion landed near Leonardtown and advanced in concert with ships of the squadron, causing the US forces to withdraw. The battalion was deployed to the south of the Potomac, moving down to Nomini. The battalion was subsequently landed at St Clements Bay on 23 July, Machodoc creek on 26 July, and Chaptico, Maryland on 30 July.

The first week of August was spent raiding the entrance to the Yeocomico River, which concluded with the capture of four schooners at the town of Kinsale, Virginia. On 7 August, the battalion stormed a gun battery of three artillery pieces, situated on the Coan River (a few miles below the Yaocomico river).

During the Chesapeake campaign the 3rd Battalion participated in the Battle of Bladensburg, the attack on Washington and the Battle of Baltimore. The attack on Washington cost the Navy one man killed and six wounded.

After Lieutenant Colonel James Malcolm arrived, the battalion was split into the reconstituted second battalion, and the third battalion (composed of Royal and Colonial Marines), as outlined below.

=== From September 1814 to 1815 ===
Cochrane ordered that three of the 10 companies from this unit become the nucleus of a regenerated 3rd Battalion, under the command of Major Lewis. These three companies joined the three companies of the Corps of Colonial Marines, formed in May of that year, to make a new 3rd Battalion Royal and Colonial Marines. The Colonial Marines had made their combat debut on the raid on Pungoteague Creek (30 May 1814), with one fatal casualty, and had then carried out incursions at Chesconessex Creek in June and Onancock in August and were involved in the Washington campaign with one man killed and three wounded. Prior to the establishment of the Corps, some of its men had been employed to good effect as scouts and guides with raiding parties.

The 3rd Battalion subsequently deployed to Cumberland Island along with the 1st and 2nd Battalions. Major Andrew Kinsman, having arrived from England, took over as commanding officer. When news reached the troops that peace had been made, the 3rd Battalion embarked on 10 March, disembarking on Ireland Island, Bermuda, on 21 March. The battalion's several Colonial companies were renamed the 3rd Battalion Colonial Marines and, after 16 months of garrison duty in the new Royal Naval Dockyard, were settled on new lands in Trinidad on 20 August 1816, forming the community of "the Merikens" in the areas known since then as the "Company Villages". The three remaining Royal Marine companies of the original 3rd Battalion were returned to England during 1815.

==== Nicolls and his detachment ====
Nicolls and his detachment, embarked aboard Carron and Hermes, departed Bermuda, stopped at Havana and arrived at Apalachicola, Florida 20 miles down river of Prospect Bluff on 13 August 1814. The Governor of West Florida requested the redeployment of British forces to Pensacola. They saw action at Fort Bowyer on 15 September 1814. On 8 November 1814, the detachment were evacuated from the outlying Fort San Carlos de Barrancas to Prospect Bluff, the Spanish garrison of Pensacola having surrendered the day before. Nicolls was dismissive of the quality of the men under his command. (Note: 'The men I got from [Major Lewis of the] 3rd [Battalion] are the worst I ever saw, not ten of them are fit to drill others, and the non-commissioned officers equally bad.') Nicolls was requested to meet Cochrane in December, but the detachment remained. Nicolls was accompanied by a handful of tribal elders and their entourage.

After the defeat at the Battle of New Orleans, Edward Nicolls embarked HMS Erebus at Cat Island Roads, and disembarked at Apalachicola on 25 January 1815. Cochrane sent the transports Mars and Florida, accompanied by the Erebus, with gifts for the Indians and provisions for the garrison at Prospect Bluff. A draft of reinforcements and a Company of the West India Regiment were disembarked. Despite having arrived on 23 January, the disembarkation was not completed until 28 January 1815.

The start of 1815 was to have seen a British offensive in the south, with the Royal Marine Battalions to advance westward into Georgia, to be joined by Nicolls and his forces from the Gulf Coast advancing northwards. (Note: 'Intended route of operations by the Detachment and Indians under Major Nicolls' dated 6 January 1815, fron Nicolls to Cochrane) These plans were overtaken by events, as peace was declared following the conclusion of the Treaty of Ghent. With the offensive cancelled, Nicolls and his men returned to Prospect Bluff in March.

Of the detachment in Florida, a number of men were shipped to Portsmouth aboard HMS Seahorse, disembarking on 31 May 1815. A larger number of men were transported aboard HMS Cydnus to Bermuda, where they disembarked in June 1815, to form the Staff and Supernumerary companies of the 3rd Battalion, commanded by Lieutenant Crozier and Captain Farmar respectively. (Note: By their Lordships Order they were to be borne on the books of [my Flag-] Ship as Supernumeraries while detached on shore in the performance of the duties of the naval arsenal.) (Note: NB The supernumeraries Returned here are part of a Detachment - late under the Command of Major Nicolls (RM) waiting a Passage to England - Taken on the strength of the Third Battalion for Pay & Provision only.) The artillerymen departed Florida with Nicolls, (Note: The Forward had [Mars and Britannia,] two transports under her convoy, with part of the marine artillery on board, from Pensacola, which she was obliged to leave up at Bermuda, to be hove down, in consequence of their being so leaky.) performed garrison duties in Bermuda, and returned to Britain in November 1815.

The Supernumerary company was embarked aboard HMS Niobe in January 1816. A third of the Staff company embarked HMS Narcissus in April 1816 duly arriving in Portsmouth on 2 May 1816, with the remainder embarking the transport ship Mary & Dorothy in November, and disembarking in Portsmouth on 1 December 1816. The final element, Captain Thomas Carter, 5 other officers, a Corporal and 5 Privates embarked HMS Menai, commanded by Watkin Owen Pell, on 22 November and arrived at Chatham on 31 December 1816. These men were quartered aboard the Receiving Ship Ruby, given that Bermuda Dockyard and the barracks were being constructed at that time.

== Disbandment ==
At the end of the Napoleonic Wars, the Royal Marines were reduced from their peak strength of 31,000 down to a peace establishment of 6000 men. There was no longer a justification to maintain standalone battalions, and marine infantrymen returned to their primary role of onboard security aboard warships, as part of the vessel's complement of marines.

== See also ==
- Corps of Colonial Marines
- Napoleonic Wars
- War of 1812
