= Thomas Parke (Royal Marines officer) =

General Thomas Parke CB
- Born: 13 October 1780; Fawley, Hampshire, England
- Died: 3 September 1858 (aged 77)
- Military career
- Allegiance: United Kingdom
- Branch: Royal Marines
- Service years: 1795–1857
- Rank: General
- Conflicts: Napoleonic Wars; War of 1812
- Awards: Companion of the Order of the Bath

General Thomas Adams Parke, CB (13 October 1780 – 3 March 1858) was a career officer in the Royal Marines. Associated with the Royal Marine Artillery (RMA) of the nineteenth century Royal Marines; he was for many years commandant of that corps. Toward the end of his long and distinguished service, he led the Woolwich Division of the Royal Marines as Colonel Commandant.

== Personal life ==
Thomas Adams Parke was born in the civil parish of Fawley, Hampshire, on 13 October 1780, the son of Thomas Parke and his wife Mary. He married Eliza Maskal at Alverstoke, Hampshire on 9 November 1805. Upon his retirement, he lived in Portsmouth with his wife and one of their daughters, Mary Anne. One of his sons, Henry William Parke (1807–1891), was commissioned in the Royal Marine Artillery in 1822 and after spending almost forty years in the service retired with the rank of major general on full pay in 1859. Another son, Hamnett Parke (1811–1858), was a captain in the Royal Marine Artillery. "General Thomas Adams Parke, C.B., of the Royal Marines" died "at his residence, Hythe, near Southampton" on 3 September 1858. He was then 77 years old.

== Service ==
He served in the Napoleonic Wars; his first notable action was the Battle of Camperdown aboard HMS Triumph.

In 1812, he commanded two companies of artillery which supported the 1st and 2nd Battalions, Royal Marines in Spain. He was the Marine Artillery brigade commander when this force redeployed to North America in 1813 to fight in the United States, with a rocket detachment supplementing his original two companies.

== Promotions, awards, and titles ==
- Second Lieutenant, (H.M. Marine Forces) 19 May 1795.
- First Lieutenant, (H.M. Marine Forces) 23 November 1796.
- Captain, Royal Marine Artillery (Royal Marines) 15 August 1805.
  - Brevet Major, (Army List) 12 August 1819.
- Major, Royal Marine Artillery (Royal Marines) 22 July 1830.
- Lieutenant Colonel Royal Marine Artillery (Royal Marines) 31 December 1832.
- Colonel, and 2nd Commandant Royal Marines 26 Apr 1838.
- Colonel Commandant, Royal Marines 12 February 1842.
  - Brevet Major General, (Army List) 11 November 1851.
  - Brevet Lieutenant General, (Army List) 20 June 1855.
  - Brevet General, (Army List) 2 February 1857.
- Companion of the Order of the Bath 26 September 1831.
- Naval General Service Medal (1847) with clasp "Camperdown".
- Good service pension awarded 27 June 1857.
