= Woodyard, Maryland =

Unincorporated community in Maryland, United States

- Unincorporated community
- Location within Maryland
- Coordinates: 38°47′09″N 76°50′34″W
- Country: United States of America
- State: Maryland
- County: Prince George's
- Elevation: 197 ft (60 m)
- Time zone: UTC-5 (Eastern (EST))
  - Summer (DST): UTC-4 (EDT)
- Area codes: 301 & 240
- GNIS feature ID: 598285

Woodyard is an unincorporated community in Prince George's County, Maryland, United States.
