= Pulteney Malcolm =

Royal Navy officer (1768–1838)

Admiral Sir Pulteney Malcolm GCB GCMG
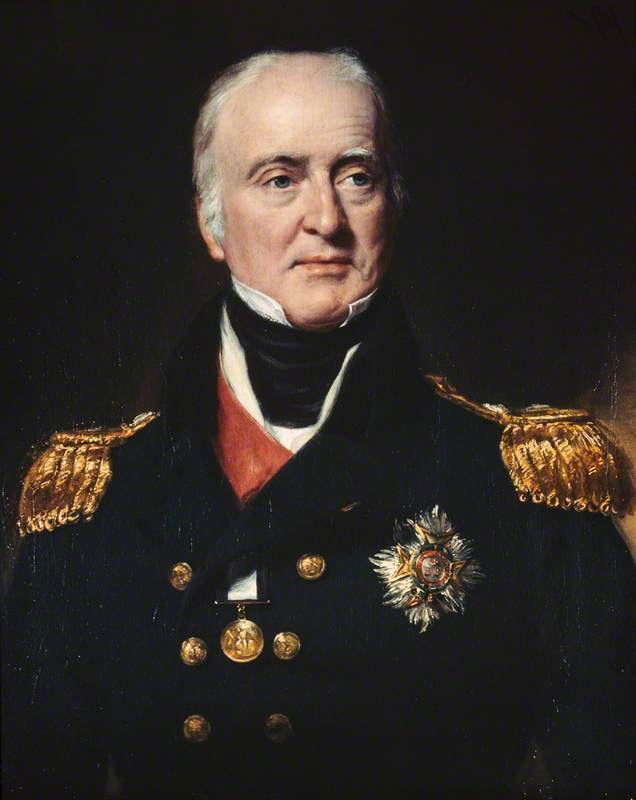
- Sir Pulteney Malcolm
- Born: 20 February 1768; Douglan, Langholm, Dumfriesshire, Scotland
- Died: 20 July 1838 (aged 70); East Lodge, Enfield, London
- Relatives: Sir Charles Malcolm (brother); Sir James Malcolm (brother); Sir John Malcolm (brother)
- Military career
- Allegiance: Great Britain; United Kingdom
- Branch: Royal Navy
- Service years: 1778–1834
- Rank: Admiral
- Conflicts: American Revolutionary War; French Revolutionary Wars; War of 1812; Napoleonic Wars
- Awards: Knight Grand Cross of the Order of the Bath; Companion of the Order of St Michael and St George

Admiral Sir Pulteney Malcolm GCB GCMG (20 February 1768 – 20 July 1838) was a Royal Navy officer. He was born at Douglan, near Langholm, Scotland, on 20 February 1768, the third son of George Malcolm of Burnfoot, Langholm and his wife Margaret, the sister of Admiral Sir Thomas Pasley. His brothers were Sir James Malcolm, Sir John Malcolm, and Sir Charles Malcolm.

== 1778–1793, Midshipman to Lieutenant ==
He entered the navy in 1778, during the American Revolutionary War, on the books of the Sibyl, commanded by his uncle, Captain Pasley. With Pasley he afterwards served in the Jupiter, in the squadron under Commodore George Johnstone, and was present at the action in Porto Praya and at the capture of the Dutch Indiamen in Saldanha Bay. In 1782 the Jupiter carried out Admiral Pigot to the West Indies. Malcolm was thus brought under the admiral's notice, was taken by him into the flagship, and some months later, on 3 March 1783, was promoted to be lieutenant of the Jupiter.

He continued serving during the peace, and in 1793, at the beginning of the French Revolutionary Wars, was first lieutenant of the Penelope frigate on the Jamaica station, under the command of Captain Bartholomew Rowley. The Penelope's service was peculiarly active. In company with the Iphigenia she captured the French frigate Inconstante, on the coast of San Domingo, on 25 November 1793; she captured or cut out many privateers or merchant vessels; and Malcolm, as first lieutenant, commanded her boats in several sharp conflicts.

== 1794–1804, Post-Captain ==
Early in 1794 Commodore Ford took him into his flagship the Europa, and on 3 April promoted him to the command of the Jack Tar, which he took to England. On 22 October he was posted, and a few days later appointed to the Fox frigate. In February 1795 he convoyed a fleet of merchant ships to the Mediterranean; thence he went to Quebec, and afterwards was employed for some time in the North Sea. Later on he was sent out to the East Indies, and towards the end of 1797 into the China Seas, under the command of Captain Edward Cooke, in whose company he entered Manila Bay under false colours, on 14 January 1798 in the bloodless Raid on Manila, and carried off three Spanish gunboats. After some further cruising among the islands the Fox returned to India, where, on 18 June, Malcolm was appointed by Rear-Admiral Rainier to be his flag captain in the Suffolk, and afterwards in the Victorious. He continued to serve in this capacity during the war. On her homeward passage, in 1803, the Victorious proved exceedingly leaky, and, meeting with heavy weather in the North Atlantic, was with difficulty kept afloat till she reached the Tagus, where she was run ashore and broken up. Malcolm, with the officers and crew, returned to England in two vessels which he chartered at Lisbon.

== 1804–1805, Battle of Trafalgar ==
In February 1804 Malcolm went out to the Mediterranean in the Royal Sovereign, in which, on her arrival, Sir Richard Bickerton hoisted his flag, and Malcolm was appointed to the Kent, then with Nelson blockading Toulon. He was, however, almost immediately sent to Naples, where, or in the neighbourhood, he remained during the year. His transfer to the Renown in July did not change his station. It was not till the beginning of 1805 that he was permitted to rejoin the flag, and to exchange into the Donegal, in time to take part in the celebrated pursuit of the French fleet to the West Indies (see Horatio Nelson). On the return of the fleet to the Channel, the Donegal, with others, was sent to reinforce Collingwood off Cadiz, and was still there when Nelson resumed the command on 28 September.

On 17 October Donegal was sent to Gibraltar for water and a hurried refit. On 20 October Malcolm learnt that the combined fleet was coming out of Cadiz. His ship was then in the Mole, nearly dismantled; but by the greatest exertions he got her out that night, and on 22 October she sailed from Gibraltar with her foreyard towing alongside. It was blowing a gale from the westward, but she succeeded in getting through the Straits, and on the morning of 24 October re-joined the fleet, too late for the battle of Trafalgar, fought on 21 October, but in time to render most valuable assistance to the disabled ships and more disabled prizes. She captured the Rayo, which had made a sally from Cadiz on 23 October; and in the night of 24 October, when some of the prisoners on board the French ship Berwick cut the cable and let her go on shore, on which she almost immediately broke up, the Donegal's boats succeeded in saving a considerable number of her men. She afterwards took charge of the Spanish prize Bahama, and brought her to Gibraltar. Writing to Sir Thomas Pasley on 16 December Collingwood said: "Everybody was sorry Malcolm was not there [sc. at Trafalgar], because everybody knows his spirit, and his skill would have acquired him honour. He got out of the Gut when nobody else could and was of infinite service to us after the action."

== 1806–1816, Captain to Rear-admiral ==
The Donegal continued off to cruise off Cadiz till the close of the year, when she sailed for the West Indies with Sir John Duckworth, and took an important part in the Battle of San Domingo, 6 February 1806. Malcolm was afterwards sent home in charge of the prizes, and in a very heavy gale rescued the crew of the Brave as she was on the point of foundering. He received the gold medal for St. Domingo, and was presented by the Patriotic Fund with a vase valued at a hundred guineas. In 1808 he was engaged in convoying troops to the Peninsula, and in 1809, still in the Donegal, was attached to the Channel Fleet, then commanded by Lord Gambier, and took part in the Battle of the Basque Roads. In the summer of 1809 he was called as a witness at the Court-martial of James, Lord Gambier which assessed whether Gambier had failed to support Captain Lord Cochrane at the battle. Gambier was controversially cleared of all charges. In November 1810 Malcolm led an attack on a French frigate squadron anchored at Saint-Vaast-la-Hougue at the action of 15 November 1810, which ultimately led to the destruction of the Elisa.

The Donegal was paid off in 1811, and Malcolm was appointed to the Royal Oak, which he commanded off Cherbourg till March 1812, when he accepted the post of captain of the fleet to Lord Keith, his uncle by marriage. He was promoted to be rear-admiral on 4 December 1813, but remained with Keith till June 1814, when, with his flag in the Royal Oak, he convoyed a detachment of the army from Bordeaux to North America, and served during the war with the United States as third in command under Sir Alexander Cochrane and Rear-admiral (afterwards Sir) George Cockburn. On 2 January 1815 he was nominated a K.C.B., and during "The Hundred Days' War" commanded a squadron in the North Sea, in co-operation with the army under the Duke of Wellington.

== 1816–1838, Commander-in-chief ==
In 1816–17 he was Commander-in-chief on the Saint Helena station, specially appointed to enforce a rigid blockade of the island and to keep a close guard on Napoleon Bonaparte. He was advanced to vice-admiral on 19 July 1821, and Commander-in-Chief, Mediterranean Fleet from 1828 to 1831. In 1832 he commanded on the coast of Holland, with the fleets of France and Spain under his orders; and in 1833–4 was again commander-in-chief in the Mediterranean. He was nominated a G.C.M.G. on 21 January 1829, and a G.C.B. on 26 April 1833.

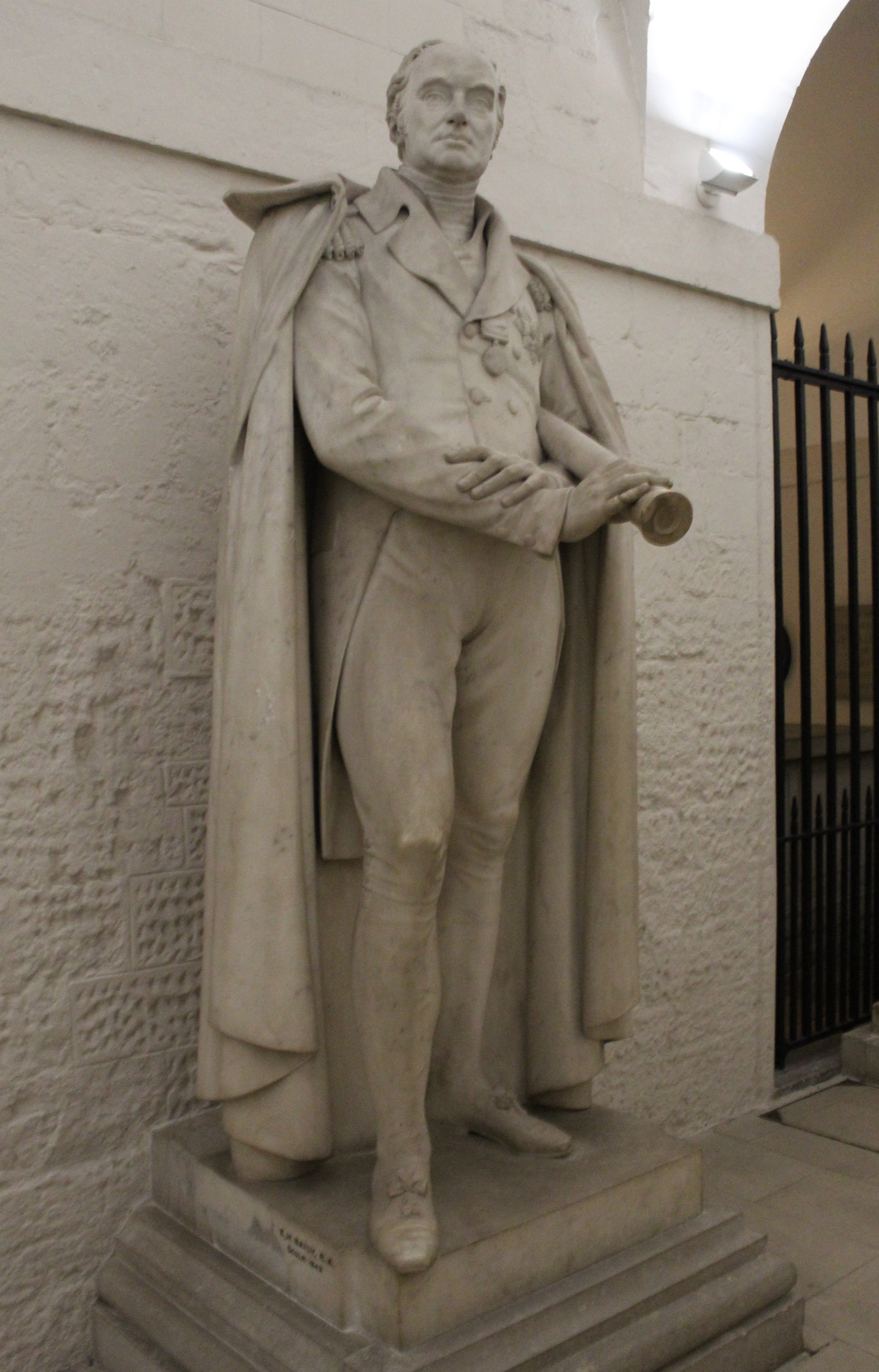
Statue of Pulteney Malcolm, the crypt of St Paul's Cathedral, London

In the final years of his life, he became Chairman of the Oriental Club which had been founded by his brother General Sir John Malcolm.

He attained the rank of Admiral of the Blue in 1837. He died at East Lodge, Enfield, London, on 20 July 1838.

== Personal life ==
He married, on 18 January 1809, Clementina, eldest daughter of the Hon. William Fullerton Elphinstone, a director of the East India Company, and elder brother of Lord Keith.

== Memorials ==
The post-war Royal Navy frigate HMS Malcolm was named after Sir Pulteney Malcolm, as were Pulteney Street, Adelaide and Malcolm Island, British Columbia; the south-west extremity of which is named Pulteney Point.

There is a memorial statue, by Edward Hodges Baily, to Malcolm in the Nelson Chamber of the crypt of St Paul's Cathedral while another statue stands in Langholm.

== See also ==
- Clan Malcolm

Military offices
Preceded by Sir Edward Codrington	Commander-in-Chief, Mediterranean Fleet; 1828–1831	Succeeded by Sir Henry Hotham
Preceded by Sir Henry Hotham	Commander-in-Chief, Mediterranean Fleet; 1833–1837	Succeeded by Sir Josias Rowley
