= Thomas Evans (British Army officer) =

British Army officer

General Thomas Evans CB
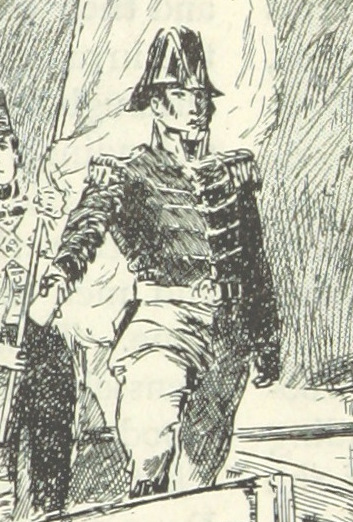
- Evans attempting a prisoner exchange prior to the Battle of Queenston Heights, 1812
- Born: 9 March 1777; Wolverhampton, England
- Died: 11 February 1863 (aged 85); Trois-Rivières, Canada
- Spouse: Harriet Lawrence Ogden (m. 1810–1858)
- Military career
- Allegiance: United Kingdom
- Branch: British Army
- Service years: 1793–1838
- Rank: General
- Commands: 8th Regiment of Foot; 70th Regiment of Foot; Acting Governor of Malta
- Conflicts: French Revolutionary Wars; West Indies campaign; Mediterranean campaign; Capture of Minorca; Egypt campaign; Battle of Abukir; Battle of Mandora; Battle of Alexandria; Siege of El Rahmaniya; Siege of Cairo; Siege of Alexandria; Napoleonic Wars; War of 1812; Siege of Detroit; Battle of Queenston Heights; Battle of Fort George; Battle of Sacket's Harbor (WIA); Battle of Forty Mile Creek; Battle of Chippawa; Battle of Lundy's Lane; Siege of Fort Erie (WIA)
- Awards: Military General Service Medal

General Thomas Evans CB (9 March 1777 – 11 February 1863) was a British Army officer who saw service throughout the French Revolutionary Wars, Napoleonic Wars, and War of 1812.

== Military career ==
Evans was born the son of a Wolverhampton innkeeper. He had lost both of his parents by age 16, and promptly decided to embark on a career as a soldier. He served in the British Army from 1793 to 1838, fighting in the French Revolutionary Wars and the Napoleonic Wars. As a major and aide-de-camp to Major General Isaac Brock, he served in Canada during the War of 1812 against the United States.

Before the Battle of Queenston Heights, he attempted to facilitate a prisoner trade on 12 October. After he was repeatedly told that no trade could be arranged until "the day after tomorrow," and noticing that several boats had been hidden along the shore, he managed to deduce that a crossing was planned for 13 October. After returning to the Canadian side, he was able to convince Brock of this and allowed the British and Canadian militaries to prepare. Evans was wounded at the Second Battle of Sacket's Harbor, in New York.

After 1827 he held important posts in Ireland, Gibraltar and Malta. He later retired to Canada.

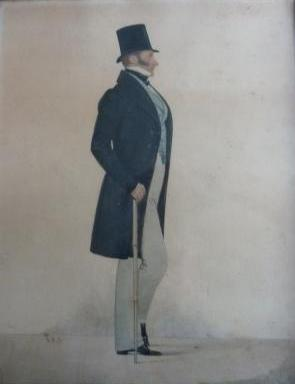
Evans while acting governor of Malta in 1838

== Personal life ==
He married Harriet Lawrence Ogden on 12 March 1810 in Montreal. The Ogdens were a prominent Loyalist family in Canada. Harriet's siblings included Peter Skene Ogden and Charles Richard Ogden.

Military offices
Preceded by Sir Neil Douglas	Colonel of the 81st Regiment of Foot (Loyal Lincoln Volunteers); 1847–1863	Succeeded by William Frederick Forster
