= Royal Sicilian Regiment =

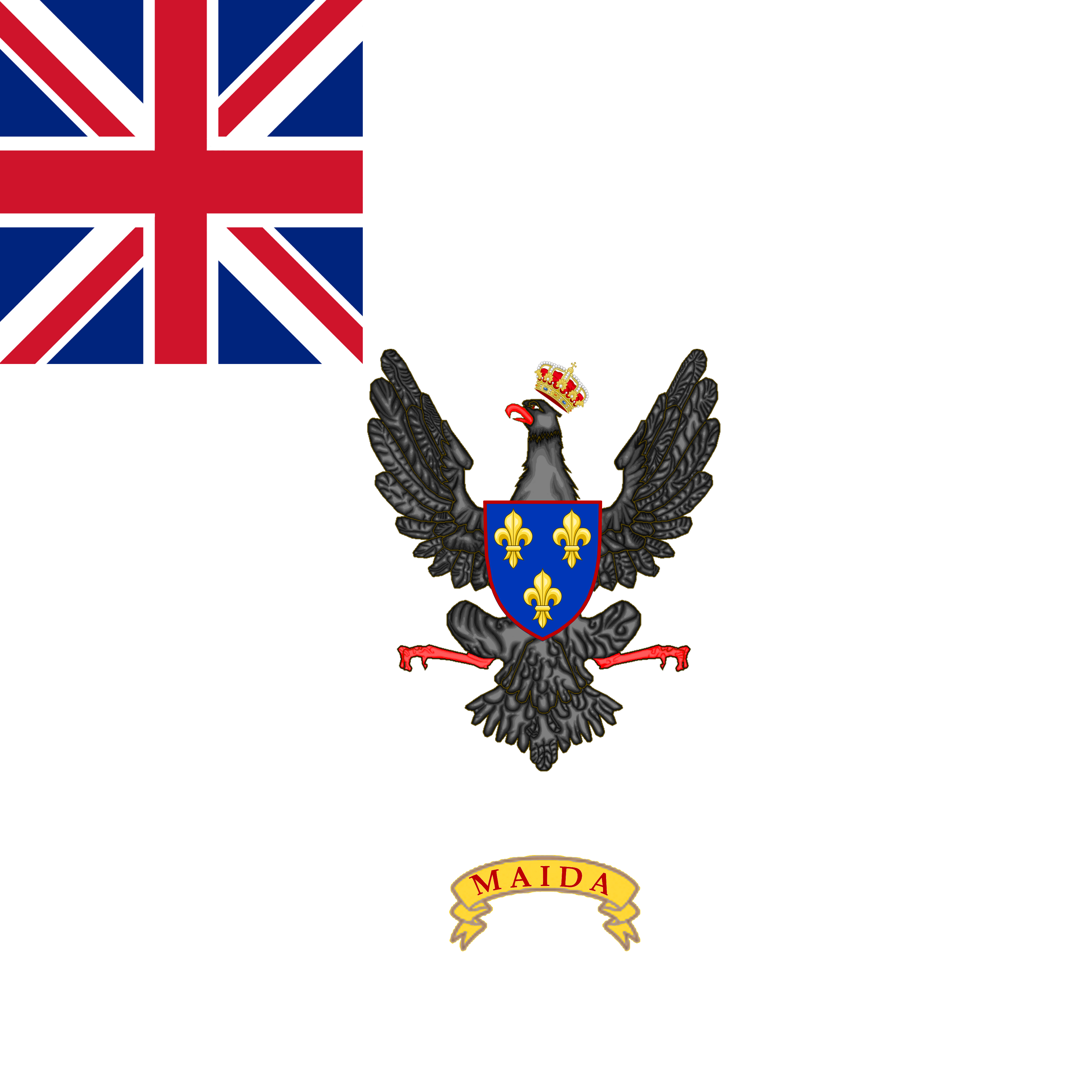
- Regimental Colours of the Royal Sicilian Regiment of Foot
- Active: 10 May 1806–1816
- Country: United Kingdom
- Branch: British Army
- Type: Light Infantry
- Size: one battalion (1350 men max in 1812)
- Garrison/HQ: Floriana HQ, Malta
- Colors: white flag, with a black flying eagle, crowned, bearing an escutcheon with the three fleur-de-lys of the Bourbon dynasty
- Engagements: Battle of Maida, Alexandria expedition of 1807, Peninsular War
- Battle honours: Maida

Commanders
- Colonel of the Regiment: John C. Sherbrooke; Ronald C. Ferguson
- Notable commanders: Francesco Rivarola

The Sicilian Regiment (also known as The Royal Sicilian Regiment of Foot) was a light infantry regiment recruited from Sicily that served with the British Army during the Napoleonic Wars, from 1806 to its disbandment in 1816.

== The Detachment of Royal Sicilian Volunteers ==
At first, the unit was only a detachment of volunteers, raised in Sicily by Major Count Francesco Rivarola, once he had obtained permission from King Ferdinand I and the British commander General Sir John Stuart to recruit troops in Messina. This detachment, like several other foreign corps in British pay, was to be recruited from locals for the rank and file, with mixed British and Local officers. The initial conditions were quite favourable, with a salary of a pound a day, subsistence of bread and meat, and treatment and training equal to those of the British infantry. Their first base was the Church and Monastery of S. Girolamo in Messina.

The detachment first experienced action within two months of its creation, when a small party (2 officers and 58 other ranks) at the Battle of Maida on 4 July 1806. With two companies of the Royal Corsican Rangers, they were assigned to the light brigade commanded by Colonel James Kempt. After this victorious first mission the detachment returned to Messina.

The following year, in March 1807, the Royal Sicilian Volunteers embarked for Constantinople in the mission led by General Alexander Mackenzie Fraser. This was later diverted to the Alexandria expedition of 1807. During this ill-fated mission the unit, now commanded by Colonel John Coape Sherbrooke, defended the Citadel of Qaitbay (which was nicknamed "the Cut") with a final balance of 10 killed and seven wounded. After the end of the expedition, they returned to Messina and were allowed to resume recruitment. By this time, the regiment was made of ten companies, with two more being added in 1808. They were then sent to Malta to reinforce the garrison.

== The Royal Sicilian Regiment of Foot ==
in 1808 the detachment of volunteers was raised to a proper regiment and issued its own set of regimental orders. At a ceremony at Floriana Barracks, Malta, on 2 March 1809, they were also presented with their regimental colours (a white flag with a black flying eagle, crowned, bearing an escutcheon with the three fleurs-de-lys of the Bourbon dynasty) by General Sir Hildebrand Oakes, commander of the British forces in Malta. The Regiment remained in Malta under Colonel Ronald C. Ferguson, who was appointed to command the regiment on 25 January 1809.

At this point, each company of the regiment was formed as follows:

- 4 officers
- 6 sergeants
- 5 corporals
- 4 acting corporals
- 1 artisan
- 10 carabiniers (elite sharpshooters armed with rifles and sword bayonets)
- 2 buglers
- 68 privates

In 1809, the Sicilian Regiment took part in the capture of the Ionian Islands from the French (Zante, Ithaca, Cephalonia, and Cerigo), moving up North to the island of Vis in 1812, where the 1st battalion remained headquartered for some time alongside a company of Royal Artillery. The conquest of the islands was completed in 1814, with the Regiment seeing action in the capture of Corfu.

During its stay in garrison at Malta, the regiment distinguished itself for the management of the terrible plague of that year, being highly praised for it by Governor Thomas Maitland. The following year the Regiment was to be called back to Britain, but Napoleon's escape from Elba prevented it, and the Sicilian Regiment was called on to fight Joachim Murat in Italy.

The regiment was finally disbanded on 24 March 1816, as were many other foreign regiments in the British Army, such as the King's German Legion.

== Uniform ==
In 1810 the Sicilian Regiment wore the scarlet British infantry coat with dark green facings, collar and cuffs, white lace, stovepipe shako with bugle badge (which may later have been replaced by a Tarleton helmet) with a green plume, white breeches and black 3/4 gaiters. Officers' "metal" was gold, with golden buttons with the royal crown and the words "Sicilian Regiment" around it.

== Colonels ==
- John Coape Sherbrooke. appointed 5 February 1807
- Ronald C. Ferguson, appointed 25 January 1809

== See also ==
- British Army during the Napoleonic Wars
- The United Kingdom in the Napoleonic Wars
- Types of military forces in the Napoleonic Wars
