= Francesco Rivarola =

British Army general

Lieutenant-General Count Rivarola KCMG KCH
- Born: Francesco Rivarola; 1779; Corsica
- Died: 7 October 1853 (aged 73–74); Cephalonia, Ionian Islands
- Burial place: Cephalonia
- Military career
- Allegiance: United Kingdom
- Branch: British Army
- Service years: 1795–1853
- Rank: Lieutenant-General
- Units: Royal Sicilian Regiment; Royal Corsican Rangers; Maltese Pioneers; Royal Malta Fencible Regiment
- Commands: Royal Malta Fencible Regiment; Inspector of Maltese and foreign troops stationed in Malta; Military and Civil Commandant of Zante, Cephalonia and Ithaca
- Awards: Knight Commander of the Order of St Michael and St George (KCMG); Knight Commander of the Royal Hanoverian Guelphic Order (KCH); Knight Commander of the Royal Order of Saints Maurice and Lazarus

Lieutenant-General Francesco, Count Rivarola, KCMG KCH (1779 – 7 October 1853), also known as Sir Francis Rivarola, was a Corsican who became a senior British Army officer, and served in the Napoleonic Wars throughout the Mediterranean Region. He was involved in the development of Maltese military and police forces; he also convinced the British of the value of using anti-French Mediterranean levies. He was born in 1779 on Corsica and died whilst on duty as Lieutenant Governor of Zante in 1853, on the Island of Cephalonia.

== Family background ==
Not much is known about Francesco Rivarola's immediate family, or the exact circumstances of his birth and parentage. He bore the hereditary title of ‘count’ from one of his forebears, who was created an ‘imperial count palatine’ for his services to the Holy Roman Emperor. The Rivarola family were originally from Spain via the Mantua area of Italy, but had become emigres after a dispute with the Spanish royal family of the time. Branches of the family had settled in Corsica, mainland Italy and Sicily. Francis’ ancestors had been ambassadors, army commanders, painters and senior clerics in the Roman Catholic church.

What seems certain is that his direct line descendants resettled in England and at least two male successors used the title Count Rivarola (referring to its derivation as bestowed by the Holy Roman Emperor).

== Military career ==
Francis Rivarola was commissioned as an ensign into the Corsican Regiment on 4 April 1795, he was promoted to lieutenant into 22nd Regiment of Foot on 21 Feb 1798. In 1801 he gave the British a glimpse of his organisational skills when he raised a unit of Maltese Pioneers to support the British military expedition to Egypt.

He was then elevated to captain in the Royal Corsican Rangers on 29 September 1804, continuing onto to be a major in the Sicilian Regiment on 6 February 1807 and then lieutenant colonel in the Sicilian Regiment on 7 March 1811. Rivarola was established as a recruiter and organiser moving as he did from the Royal Corsican Rangers to form the Sicilian Regiment. He was promoted to full colonel on 19 July 1821 and to major general on 22 July 1830. He is also credited with setting up the Royal Malta Fencible Regiment in 1815 and he went on to command the regiment and be its honorary colonel; finishing as lieutenant-general (promoted on 23 November 1841).

Rivarola spent most of his operational service in action against the French and their allies in the Mediterranean, although for the most part he is recorded as carrying out garrison duties associated with being a senior officer, such as presiding over courts-martial; one of which caused considerable controversy as it resulted in the dismissal of two Royal Artillery officers.

Malta's Governor Sir Thomas Maitland newly arrived in post, was quickly impressed by the Corsican and made great use of Rivarola's management talents; and had him acting as the Islands' inspector general (police commissioner) during his first crisis: the 1813–1814 Malta plague epidemic. It has been postulated that the effects of the bubonic plague outbreak across Malta would have been considerably worse had it not been for Maitland empowering Rivarola to impose martial law and strict containment strategies on disease locales. Rivarola also played a critical role in dealing with and containing the spread of the Bubonic Plague on the island of Cephalonia (then part of his bailiwick), again Sir Thomas Maitland was fully content that the methods used previously on Malta would be used here.

He died in 1853 on the Ionian island of Cephalonia, carrying out his duties as Military and Civil Commandant of Zante, Cephalonia and Ithaca. Ironically one of his sons (a former British Army officer) died on Cephalonia six years later on 8 May 1859.

== See also ==
- Siege of Malta (1798–1800)
- French occupation of Malta
- Maltese Provincial Battalions
- 1813–1814 Malta plague epidemic
- Kingdom of Italy (Napoleonic)
- Septinsular Republic
