= Siege of Cairo (1801) =

1801 battle of the French invasion of Egypt and Syria

- Part of the French invasion of Egypt and Syria
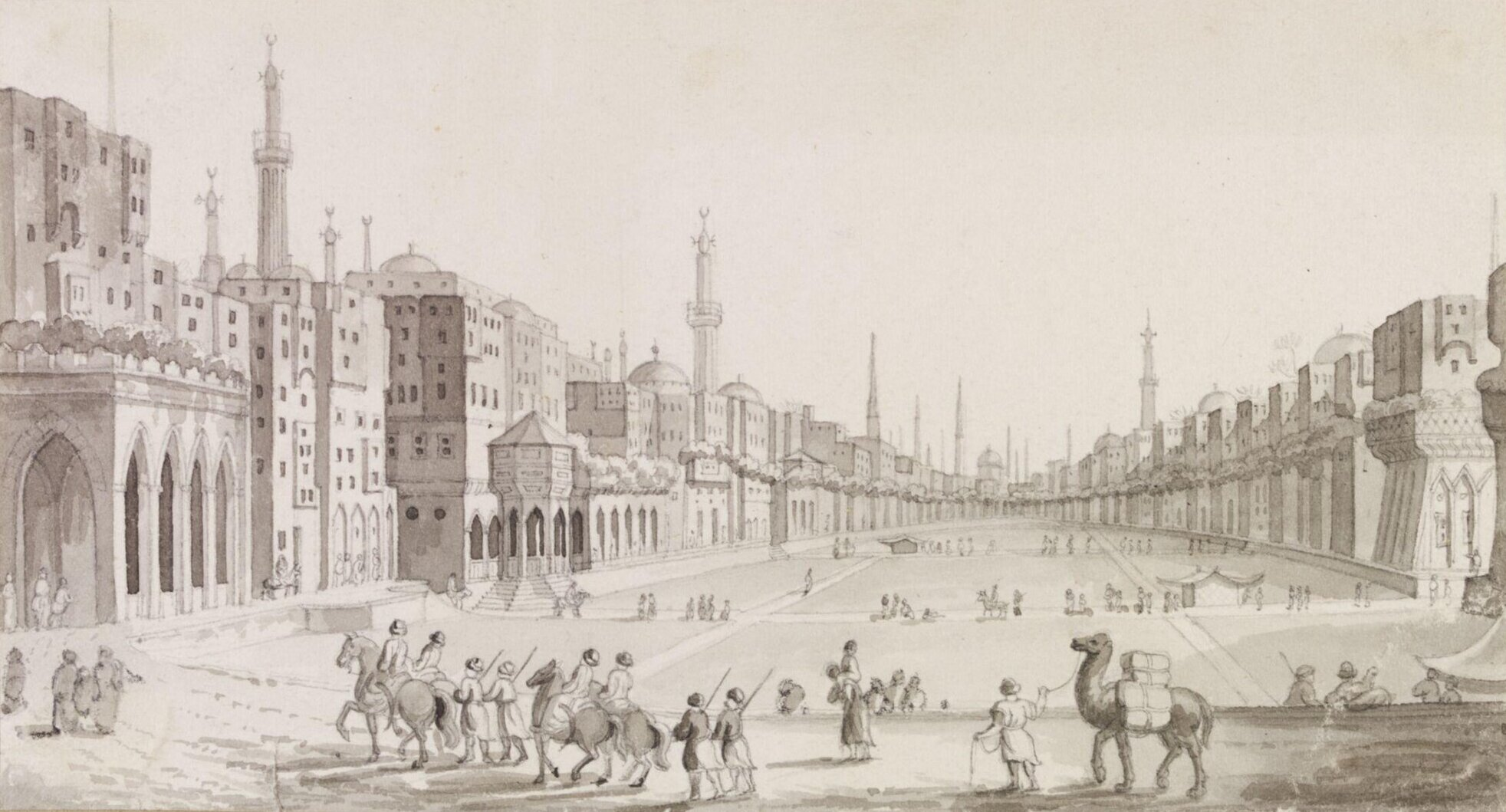
- 1801 engraving of Cairo
Date	May–June 1801
Location	Cairo, Ottoman Egypt 30°02′40″N 31°14′09″E
Result	Anglo-Ottoman victory

Belligerents
United Kingdom; Ottoman Empire	France

Commanders and leaders
(United Kingdom of Great Britain and Ireland) Hely-Hutchinson	(French First Republic) Augustin Belliard (surrendered)

Strength
20,000	14,000

Casualties and losses
Unknown	13,500 captured

War of the Second Coalition:
Egypt and Syria
current battle
Napoleon in command till 23 August 1799

The siege of Cairo, also known as the Cairo campaign, took place during the French invasion of Egypt and Syria. An Anglo-Ottoman army laid siege to French-held Cairo and captured it in the penultimate action of the invasion. British commander John Hely-Hutchinson advanced to Cairo, where he arrived after a few skirmishes in mid June. Joined by a sizeable Ottoman force Hutchinson invested Cairo and on 27 June the surrounded 13,000-strong French garrison under General Augustin Daniel Belliard, out-manned and out-gunned then surrendered. The remaining French troops in Egypt under Jacques-François Menou disheartened by this failure, retired to Alexandria.

== Background ==
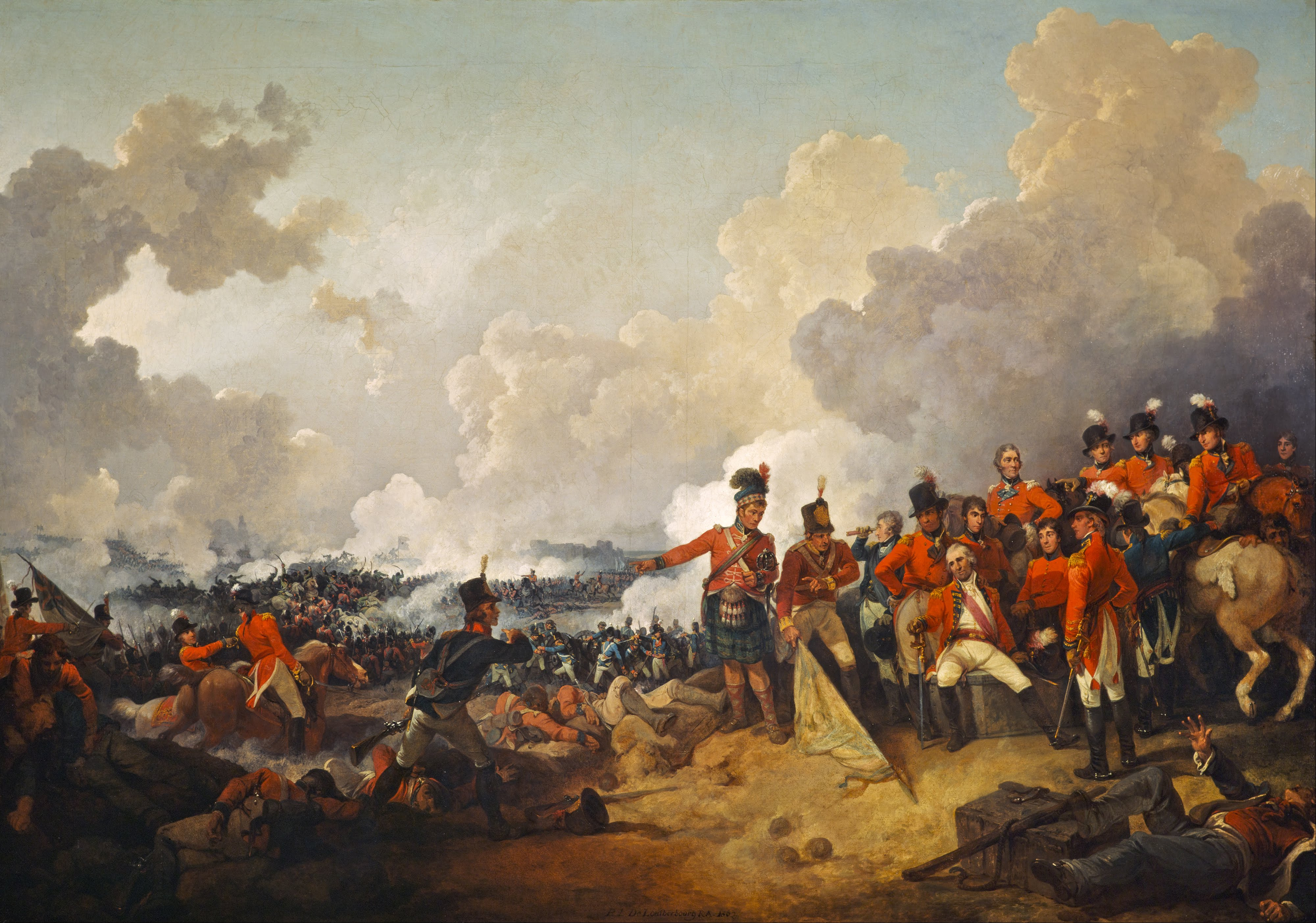
The Battle of Alexandria by Philip James de Loutherbourg.

With General Ralph Abercromby's death at the Battle of Canope, John Hely-Hutchinson succeeded as commander of the British force in August. On 26 April Major General Eyre Coote was left in command of the army before Alexandria while Hutchinson arrived at Rosetta to press home the operations against the French in the interior of the country that lead towards Cairo.

The British fifty gun ship HMS Leopard under Commodore John Blankett anchored in the road of Suez on 21 April along with three frigates and sloops and a number of transports. Native troops hired from the East India Company from Bombay amounting to about 6,000 were to support with those disembarked on the shore. On the 22nd at daybreak an officer and a party of the 86th regiment of foot landed from the Leopard and took possession of the town of Suez which the French garrison had previously evacuated. At 8 am the British Union Jack was hoisted on shore and afterwards the transports disembarked their troops. Soon after they consolidated their gains and set up camp while the rest of the force arrived.

On 5 May Hutchinson now with 8,000 British troops marched along the banks of the Nile towards the position of General Lagrange at El Aft accompanied on the river by a division of British and Ottoman gun boats. Meanwhile, Sir William Sidney Smith in HMS Tigre with Commander James Hillyar were expecting the arrival of Rear Admiral Joseph Antoine Ganteaume upon the coast in support of the French land forces. The French squadron under Gantheaume consisting of four ships of the line – a frigate, a corvette and five transports had been off the coast for some days. The men of war had between three and four thousand troops on board all. however Gantheaume fearing the approach of Sydney's ships which was in search of him cut his cables and stood off to sea. The five transports were empty of troops having been transferred to the ships. but the only occupants being many civilians were taken by Sydney's ships on the 7th and brought into Abu Qir Bay. The British took all the provisions and stores on board the transports and with the retreat of their fleet the French thus abandoned El Aft and retreated towards El Rahmaniya on 7 May. On the same evening allied troops entered El Aft and thus commenced the Cairo campaign.

== Cairo campaign ==
On 9 May the British force advanced to El Rahmaniya (or Er-Rahmaniyeh) where French General Lagrange had taken post with the intention of holding firm. At 10 am Royal Marines and sailors under Captain Curry with four boats and three armed launches commenced an attack upon the French forts at Er-Rahmaniyeh and at 4 pm were supported by Ottoman gunboats and soon the French made a general retreat towards Cairo leaving in the fort 110 of their sick and wounded. A French detachment of fifty cavalry from Alexandria were taken at the same time and with this they were effectively cut off with all communication between there and the interior of Egypt; the allied forces suffered only five killed and 26 wounded.

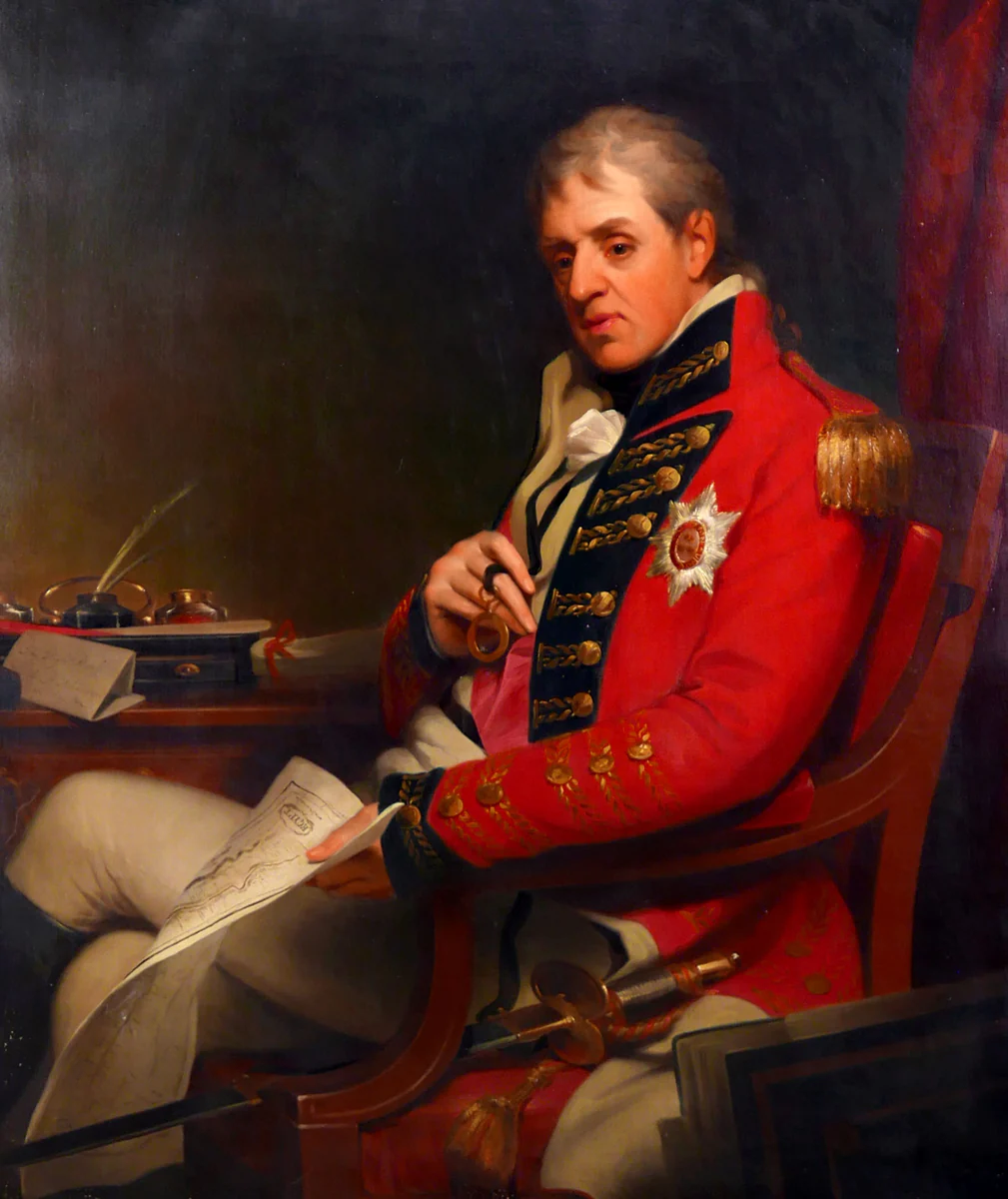
Portrait of General Hely-Hutchinson

The British force on the 14th continued their march towards the capital of Egypt and on their way captured a French armed vessel and sixteen Feluccas conveying wine, brandy and clothing listed as around £5000 in sterling and 150 troops along with heavy pieces of ordnance which were headed from Cairo to Er-Rahmaniyeh. Having entered the Nile by a canal which joins the Damietta and Rosetta branches the French commanding officer had no knowledge of the recent French defeats.

On the 17th a division of cavalry and infantry under Brigadier General Doyle after having been given information by local Arabs intercepted a body of 550 camels escorted by 560 French soldiers going from Alexandria when they had departed on the 14th towards Middle Egypt to secure provisions. The French cavalry made a tired charge but they were overtaken by a party of British dragoons and surrendered upon honourable terms. The small garrison about 200 of the fort of Ras El Bar on the Damietta branch of the Nile was invested on the same day on the land side by a flotilla of British guns and Ottoman gunboats and near the mouth of the Damietta. On seeing this the French abandoned the post and retired upon Port Said; the two garrisons numbering altogether 700 men were also evacuated and embarked on board five small vessels in the hope to be able to reach the port of Alexandria. Four of these vessels however were captured and carried into Abu Qir Bay with only one escaping to the coast of Italy. On 6 June Colonel Lloyd with his detachment of the 86th regiment numbering about 150 men set out to march across the desert to Cairo a distance by a route intended to be taken in order to avoid meeting a superior force. By the 10th these men joined Colonel John Stewart's detachment which was to be attached to Yusuf Pashas' (the Grand Vizier) army on the right bank of the Nile. Hutchinson moved about three miles in front to the village of Saael on the 14th and two days later advanced to a position just out of reach of the French works. The same day he was joined by the 28th Regiment of Foot and the 42nd Highland Regiment who had marched from the camp before Alexandria in twelve days. Meanwhile, the 320 troops under Stewart and Lloyd with the Grand Vizier moved to a parallel position and arrived on 20 June at Imbaba a village a few miles from the fortress of Giza opposite Cairo on the banks of the Nile. Here they lay directly opposite to Cairo and in which Belliard had stationed his large garrison.

Hutchinson made another movement on the 21st and invested the town of Giza with the Anglo Ottoman force encamped close to the French advanced works on the other side of the river. By this time the force besieging Cairo had swelled to 20,000 men. An important letter had been found in the pocket of French Brigade-general César Antoine Roize who was killed at the Battle of Alexandria. The letter written by Menou expressed an apprehension that the British would cut the embankment which formed the canal of Alexandria and thereby to let the waters of the sea into Lake Mariout, cutting off any chance of escape for the French. This was subsequently done by the engineers and water rushed in flooding the area and making the canal unusable and making the French with no escape route whatsoever. Some slight skirmishing took place in the evening on both banks of the Nile wherein the Mamelukes forced back a French sortie. On the 22nd preparations were made to besiege Cairo and its different forts by the allied forces.

Belliard finding himself surrounded on all sides his communication with the interior part of the country entirely cut off and without hopes of relief sent a flag of truce to Hutchinson on 22 June requesting that he would agree to a conference. In this it was agreed for the French for the evacuation of Cairo and its dependencies.

== Aftermath ==
The conference continued till the 28th when the surrender of Cairo by the French was signed and were allowed seventeen days for the final evacuation. By the terms of the treaty the French troops of which there were in effective 8,000 men with another 5,000 sick or convalescence were to be conveyed to a port of France. General John Moore then escorted them to the coast via Rosetta. On the evening of the 28th the British and the Ottoman's took possession of Giza and Cairo where the British and Turkish colours were conjointly hoisted.

The last division of the French troops taken prisoners at Cairo and at other places were by 10 August sailed from the bay of Abu qir and Hutchinson having arrived from Cairo at his headquarters before Alexandria. Article 12 of the capitulation treaty made clear than any inhabitant of Egypt whatever their religion would be free to follow the French army. As a result, many Egyptian soldiers emigrated and formed the Mamelukes of the Imperial Guard.

Immediate measures were taken to reduce the last strong hold of the French in Egypt and thus accomplish the ultimate objective of the expedition. Hutchinson, with Cairo out of the way, now began the final reduction of Alexandria – between 10 and 15 June the two divisions set off their march across the desert and the 30th arrived on the banks of the Nile.

Soon they reached Alexandria and invested the place and after a siege between 17 August – 2 September 1801 the French again capitulated and with it the final collection of French troops in the middle east.
