= Maltese Pioneers =

- Active: 1800–1801
- Country: Kingdom of Great Britain
- Branch: British Army
- Role: Pioneers
- Size: 500 men
- Engagements: French Revolutionary Wars: Egyptian Campaign

Commanders
- Lieutenant: Francesco Rivarola

The Maltese Pioneers was a pioneer corps that served from 1800 to 1801 within the British Army.

In December 1800, Sir Ralph Abercromby instructed Lieutenant Francesco Rivarola to raise and command a force of 500 Maltese volunteers as pioneers for the expeditionary force in the Egyptian Campaign. The troops were assigned to the Ordnance Department, and their work included cutting wood and loading fuel on transports. Officers could also hire the pioneers as servants. The Pioneers saw combat in March and April 1801. Apart from the pioneers, a third corps of artificers was also set up and joined the Egyptian Campaign.

After their terms of engagement expired, the Maltese Pioneers left Egypt and returned to Malta in late 1801, after a year of service.

The Pioneers shared in the proceeds of the French property captured in Egypt in 1801.
