= Battle of Abukir (1801) =

1801 battle of the French invasion of Egypt and Syria

- Part of the French invasion of Egypt and Syria
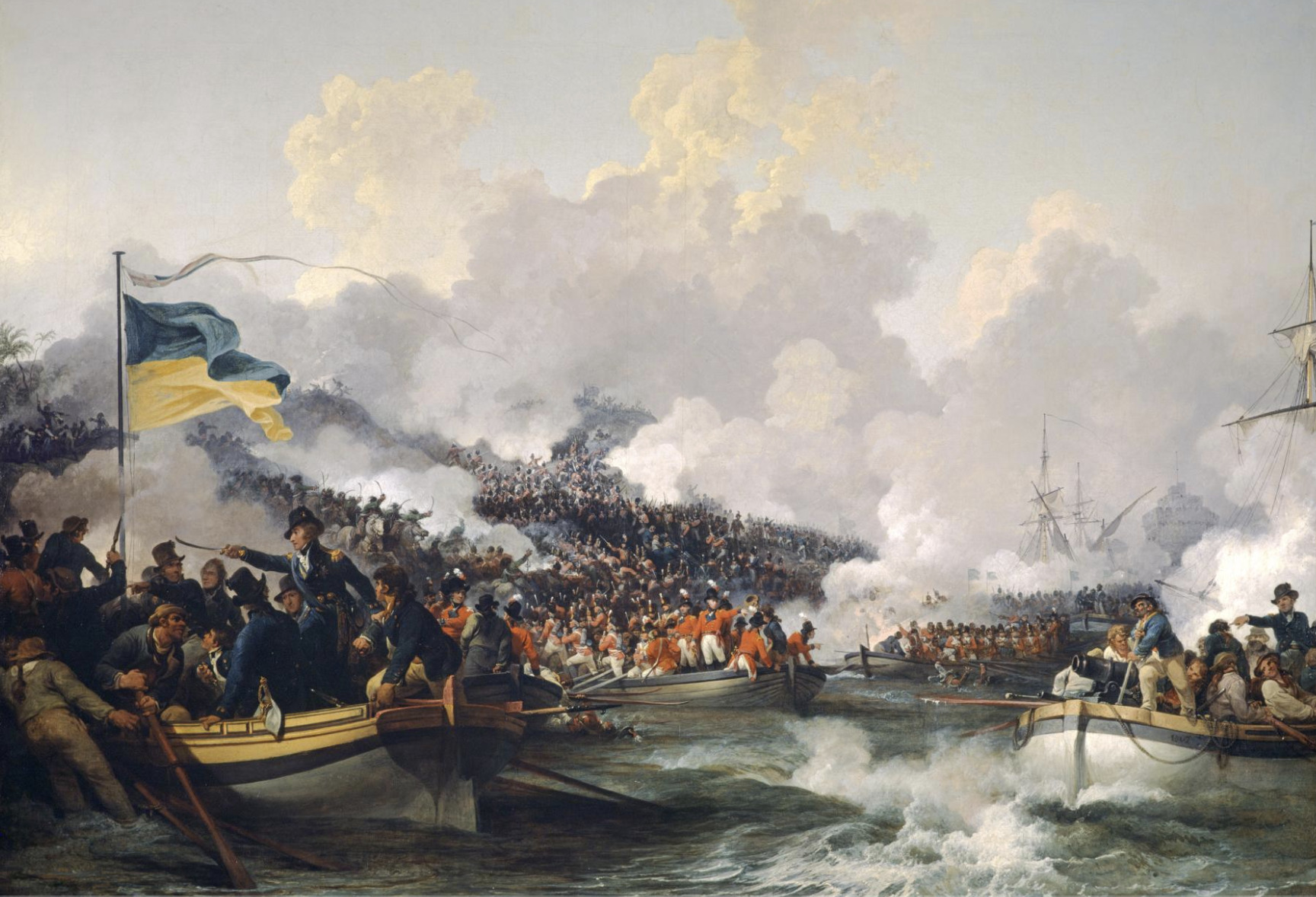
- The Landing of British Troops at Aboukir (1802)
Date	8 March 1801
Location	Abu Qir, Ottoman Egypt 31°18′38″N 30°04′06″E
Result	British victory

Belligerents
United Kingdom	France

Commanders and leaders
Ralph Abercromby; Sidney Smith	Louis Friant

Units involved
British Expeditionary Corps; Mediterranean Fleet	Army of the Orient

Strength
6,000	1,800–2,500

Casualties and losses
102 killed 515 wounded 123 missing	400 killed or wounded
- Location within Mediterranean

The Battle of Abukir of 8 March 1801 was the second pitched battle of the French invasion of Egypt and Syria to be fought at Abu Qir on the Mediterranean coast, near the Nile Delta. The landing of the British expeditionary force under Lieutenant-General Sir Ralph Abercromby was intended to defeat or drive out an estimated 21,000 remaining French troops in Egypt. The fleet commanded by Baron Keith included seven ships of the line, five frigates and a dozen smaller warships. With the troop transports, it was delayed in the bay for several days by strong gales and heavy seas before disembarkation could proceed.

== Background ==
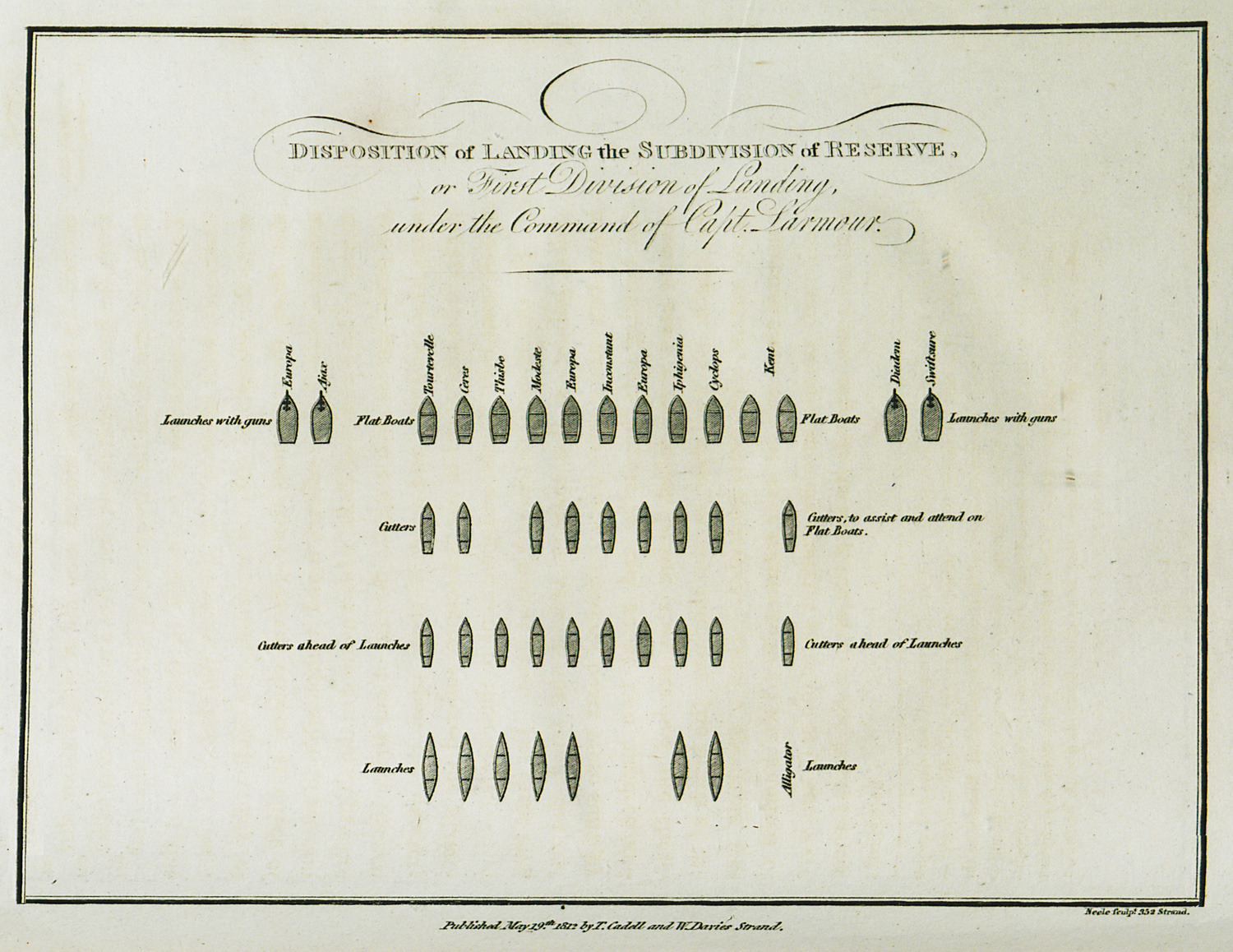
Disposition of the first division of landing under the command of Capt. Larmour (HMS Wassenaar) at the Battle. Edward Daniel Clarke

In the early morning of the 8th March 1801, the landing force consisting of flank companies of the 40th Foot and 23rd Foot on the right. In the centre the 28th, 42nd and 58th. On the left, the Brigade of Guards (formed from a battalion of each regiment), the Corsican Rangers, the Royals and 54th. The landing force totaled 5,230 men. All troops were on board the landing boats by 2 am. Its sailors tightly packed with muskets between their knees, the boats rowed silently to the rendezvous, each were placed in their positions of landing. By 8 am, each brigade was in place.

== Battle ==
At 9 am, a rocket fired from the Admirals ship signaled the advance and the boats sprang forward. The French garrison of Alexandria under Louis Friant, some 2,500 French troops and ten field guns in high positions took a heavy toll on the British. With protection from light armed vessels, ketches and bomb brigs moored broadside to the beach, the troops beached their craft under a rainstorm of cannonade and musket fire from Friant's troops positioned on the high dunes. The British disembarked, formed line, fixed bayonets and advanced. With General Moore leading at their head they struggled up the steep soft sandy ground.

The French appeared at the summit and poured a destructive musket volley. The lead troops of the 42nd reached the summit before the French could reload and launched a bayonet charge, hurling them back in confusion. The French counter attacked with a squadron of cavalry, a second bayonet charge by the 42nd caused them to flee. On the left the Guards were attacked by French cavalry and the 54th by a French bayonet charge; both attacks were repulsed. The British were now in control of the shore and advanced to expand the bridgehead; the French deserted their guns.

== Aftermath ==
By evening the Royal Navy had landed the remainder of the 17,500-strong army and its equipment in an orderly fashion and consolidated control at Aboukir. The skirmish was a prelude to the Battle of Alexandria and resulted in British losses of 730 killed and wounded or missing. The French withdrew, losing at least 300 dead or wounded and eight pieces of cannon. Napoleon later described the British landing as "one of the most vigorous actions which could be imagined".

== Orders of battle ==
=== British ===
Brigade and commander	Regiment	Number of men	Ref.
First line			
Brigade of Guards; Major-General George Ludlow	1st Battalion, Coldstream Regiment of Foot Guards	766	
Brigade of Guards; Major-General George Ludlow	1st Battalion, Third Regiment of Foot Guards	812	
1st Brigade; Major-General Eyre Coote	2nd Battalion, 1st Regiment of Foot	626	
1st Brigade; Major-General Eyre Coote	1st Battalion, 54th Regiment of Foot	974 (combined)	
1st Brigade; Major-General Eyre Coote	2nd Battalion, 54th Regiment of Foot	974 (combined)	
1st Brigade; Major-General Eyre Coote	92nd Regiment of Foot	529	
2nd Brigade; Major-General John Cradock	8th Regiment of Foot	439	
2nd Brigade; Major-General John Cradock	13th Regiment of Foot	561	
2nd Brigade; Major-General John Cradock	18th Regiment of Foot	411	
2nd Brigade; Major-General John Cradock	90th Regiment of Foot	727	
Second line
3rd Brigade; Major-General Lord Cavan	1st Battalion, 27th Regiment of Foot	Left sick at Gibraltar and Malta	
3rd Brigade; Major-General Lord Cavan	2nd Battalion, 27th Regiment of Foot	Left sick at Gibraltar and Malta	
3rd Brigade; Major-General Lord Cavan	50th Regiment of Foot	477	
3rd Brigade; Major-General Lord Cavan	79th Regiment of Foot	604	
4th Brigade; Brigadier-General John Doyle	2nd Regiment of Foot	530	
4th Brigade; Brigadier-General John Doyle	30th Regiment of Foot	412	
4th Brigade; Brigadier-General John Doyle	44th Regiment of Foot	263	
4th Brigade; Brigadier-General John Doyle	89th Regiment of Foot	378	
5th (Foreign) Brigade; Brigadier-General John Stuart	Stuart's Regiment	929	
5th (Foreign) Brigade; Brigadier-General John Stuart	Roll's Regiment	528	
5th (Foreign) Brigade; Brigadier-General John Stuart	Dillon's Regiment	530	
Reserve
Major-General John Moore; Brigadier-General Hildebrand Oakes	23rd Regiment of Foot	457	
Major-General John Moore; Brigadier-General Hildebrand Oakes	28th Regiment of Foot	587	
Major-General John Moore; Brigadier-General Hildebrand Oakes	42nd Regiment of Foot	754	
Major-General John Moore; Brigadier-General Hildebrand Oakes	58th Regiment of Foot	469	
Major-General John Moore; Brigadier-General Hildebrand Oakes	40th Regiment of Foot	250	
Major-General John Moore; Brigadier-General Hildebrand Oakes	Corsican Rangers (flank companies)	209	
Cavalry
Brigadier-General Edward Finch	11th Light Dragoons (one troop)	53	
Brigadier-General Edward Finch	12th Light Dragoons	474	
Brigadier-General Edward Finch	26th Light Dragoons	369	
Brigadier-General Edward Finch	Hompesch Hussars	138	
Artillery
Brigadier-General Robert Lawson	13th Artillery Company	627	
Brigadier-General Robert Lawson	14th Artillery Company	627	
Brigadier-General Robert Lawson	26th Artillery Company	627	
Brigadier-General Robert Lawson	28th Artillery Company	627	
Brigadier-General Robert Lawson	55th Artillery Company	627	
Brigadier-General Robert Lawson	69th Artillery Company	627	
Brigadier-General Robert Lawson	70th Artillery Company	627	
Brigadier-General Robert Lawson	71st Artillery Company	627	

=== French ===
Unit	Number of men	Ref.
Cavalry		
18th Dragoons	115	
20th Dragoons	80	
Infantry
61st demi-brigade	680	
75th demi-brigade	950	
51st demi-brigade	210	

== See also ==
- Battle of the Nile or Battle of Abukir Bay (1798)
- Battle of Abukir (1799)
