= Royal Corsican Rangers =

Former unit of the British Army

- Active: 1798–1802; 1803–1817
- Disbanded: 1817
- Country: Corsica (and Italy)
- Allegiance: Kingdom of Great Britain (to 1802); United Kingdom of Great Britain and Ireland
- Branch: Army
- Type: Light Infantry
- Size: Battalion
- Decorations: Sphinx

Commanders
- Notable commanders: Hudson Lowe

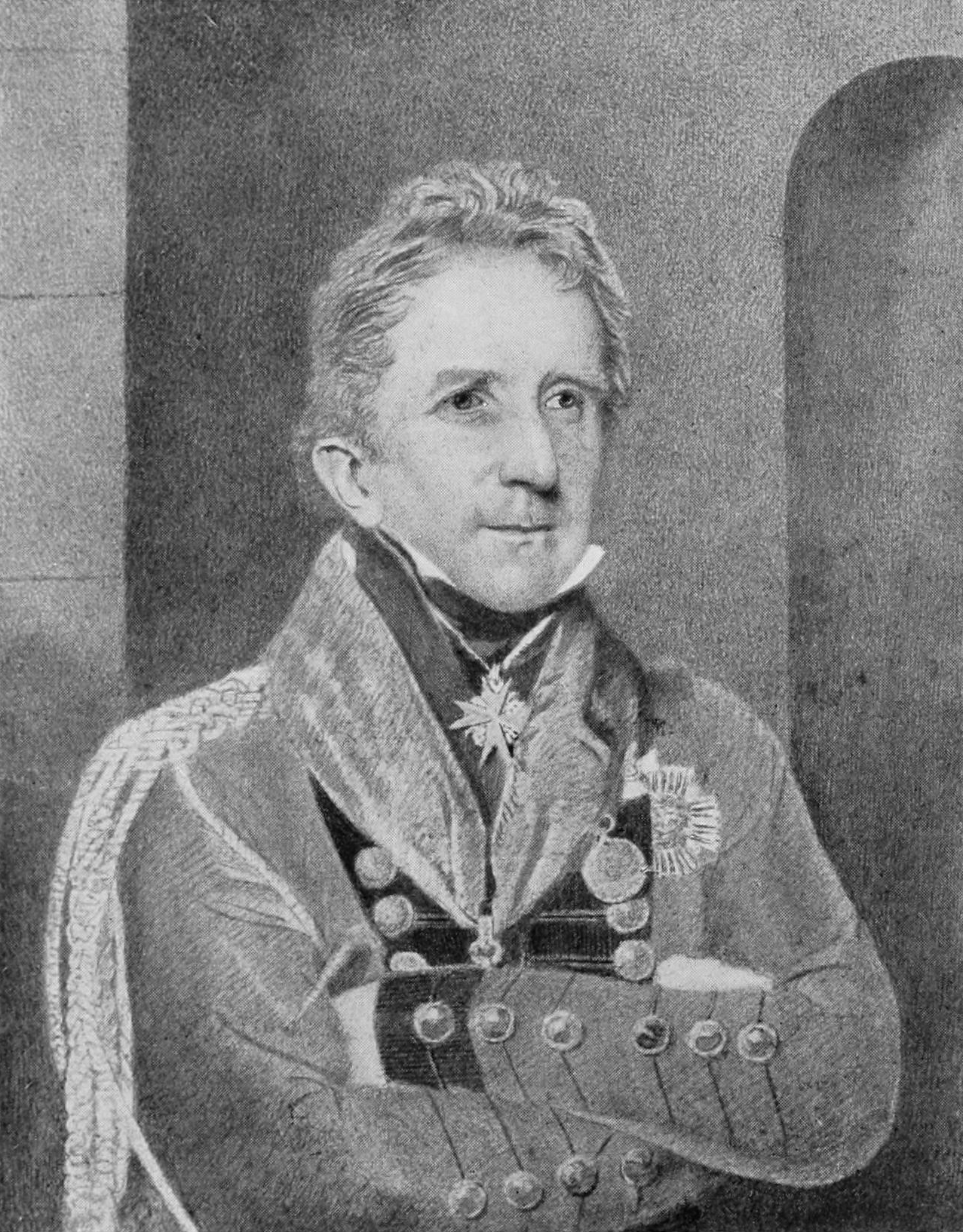
Sir Hudson Lowe

The Royal Corsican Rangers was a unit of the British Army, composed mainly of émigrés, which served during the later part of the French Revolutionary Wars and throughout the Napoleonic Wars.

== First embodiment ==
In 1794, the Corsicans under Pasquale Paoli seceded from the French Republic, and invited British troops to assist in driving French troops from the island. For two years, the island was part of an Anglo-Corsican Kingdom. However, relations between British and Corsicans soured. Spain declared war against Britain in 1796, putting all British territories in the Mediterranean at risk and prompting the British to withdraw from Corsica. Several pro-Paoli Corsicans fled the island or were exiled, and in September 1798, they formed a light infantry company known as the "Francs Tireurs Corses" on Minorca, which at the time was held by the British. The unit consisted of seven officers and 226 other ranks.

In July 1800, Captain Hudson Lowe of the 50th Foot was detached to command the unit, with the temporary rank of Major. Lowe had served on Corsica during the brief period of British control, and spoke both French and Italian. The unit was transported to Gibraltar, where they impressed General Ralph Abercromby, who was preparing an expedition to remove the French from Egypt, which the French had conquered in 1798. Abercromby issued the Rangers with new uniforms and Baker rifles, and placed them in his Reserve Division. They took part in the opposed landing at the Battle of Aboukir after which they were re-titled the Corsican Rangers.

The unit took part in the subsequent actions in Egypt. They received praise, and were entitled to wear buttons and other equipment decorated with a sphinx. The Peace of Amiens was signed between Britain and France shortly after the French evacuated Egypt. The Corsican Rangers were disbanded in Malta.

The Rangers also shared in the proceeds of the French property captured in Egypt in 1801.

== Second embodiment ==
When war broke out again between Britain and France in 1803, Major Lowe was ordered to raise a second Corsican regiment, to serve in the Mediterranean. Most of the officers Lowe nominated were Corsican, as was the hard core of 360 riflemen, organised in six companies. They were augmented by recruits from Sicily, Sardinia and Naples, to a strength of roughly 600 in ten companies. The regiment was officially accepted into the British Army in October 1804.

In July 1805, the Royal Corsican Rangers took part in a British expedition to Sicily and Naples. On 4 July 1806, three companies of the regiment took part in the Battle of Maida, which ended with a British victory.

From the end of 1806 to 1808, the Rangers were stationed on Capri, where Hudson Lowe was appointed commander of the garrison. In 1808, French and Neapolitan forces under Joachim Murat, the King of Naples imposed by the French, attacked the island and conquered it after a severe fight. Some of the Rangers deserted rather than fight Corsicans in French service, but others distinguished themselves. Lowe was forced to capitulate, but his forces were allowed to depart with full military honours.

The next year, the regiment took part in an expedition to the French-ruled Ionian Islands under General Sir John Stuart. By this time, the regiment was commanded by its former second in command, Lieutenant Colonel John McCombe. On 30 September, 600 troops from the regiment, led by Colonel Lowe (who was appointed second in command to Major General John Oswald, the commander of the division), captured Zakynthos from its outnumbered French garrison without fighting. Detachments participated in the capture of other islands of Kefalonia, Ithaca and Kythira.

On 16 October 1813, a conjunct force consisting of HMS Bacchante, HMS Saracen, and Captain Piearce Lowen of "His Majesty's Corsican Rangers", captured "Forts Espagnole and Castel Nuova", near Cattaro. In November 1827 a grant of £1600 was paid for ordnance stores captured there. (Note: a first-class share was worth £125 4s 3½d; a sixth-class share, that of an ordinary seaman or a private, was worth £1 13s 5d.) The force went on to capture Fort Cattaro on 5 January 1814.

The Rangers were stationed in the Ionian Islands until the end of the Napoleonic Wars. In 1814 and 1815, some of them took part in further actions against Murat's Neapolitan forces.

On 13 February 1814, the island of Paxos, in the Adriatic, surrendered to HMS Apollo and a detachment of 160 troops. The troops moved so rapidly through the island that the enemy did not have time to organize resistance. As a result, the British force, which included men from the 2nd Greek Light Infantry from Cephalonia, the Royal Corsican Rangers, the 35th Regiment of Foot, and other units, and marines and seamen from Apollo, captured 122 enemy troops and a small, well-designed fort of three guns.

The regiment was disbanded on Corfu in 1817. During its service in the Napoleonic Wars it had worn a uniform similar to that of the 60th (Royal American) Regiment, consisting of a dark green jacket with red facings, blue trousers and black gaiters, with black leather equipment.

== French Tirailleurs Corse ==
In 1803, the French also raised a light infantry unit on Corsica. The unit, the Tirailleurs Corse, were commanded by Philippe d'Ornano, a cousin of Napoleon Bonaparte. The unit consisted of six companies (one carabinier, one voltigeur and six chasseurs). They wore brown jackets with green (or red) cuffs, turnbacks, and collar.

The unit was often brigaded with another light infantry unit raised in Northern Italy, the Tirailleurs du Pô. The two units took part in many of the engagements fought by Napoleon's Grande Armee. In 1811, they were merged into the 11th Regiment Infantry Légère.

== See also ==
- British Army during the Napoleonic Wars
- The United Kingdom in the Napoleonic Wars
- Types of military forces in the Napoleonic Wars
