= Siege of El Rahmaniya =

1801 battle of the French invasion of Egypt and Syria

- Part of the French invasion of Egypt and Syria
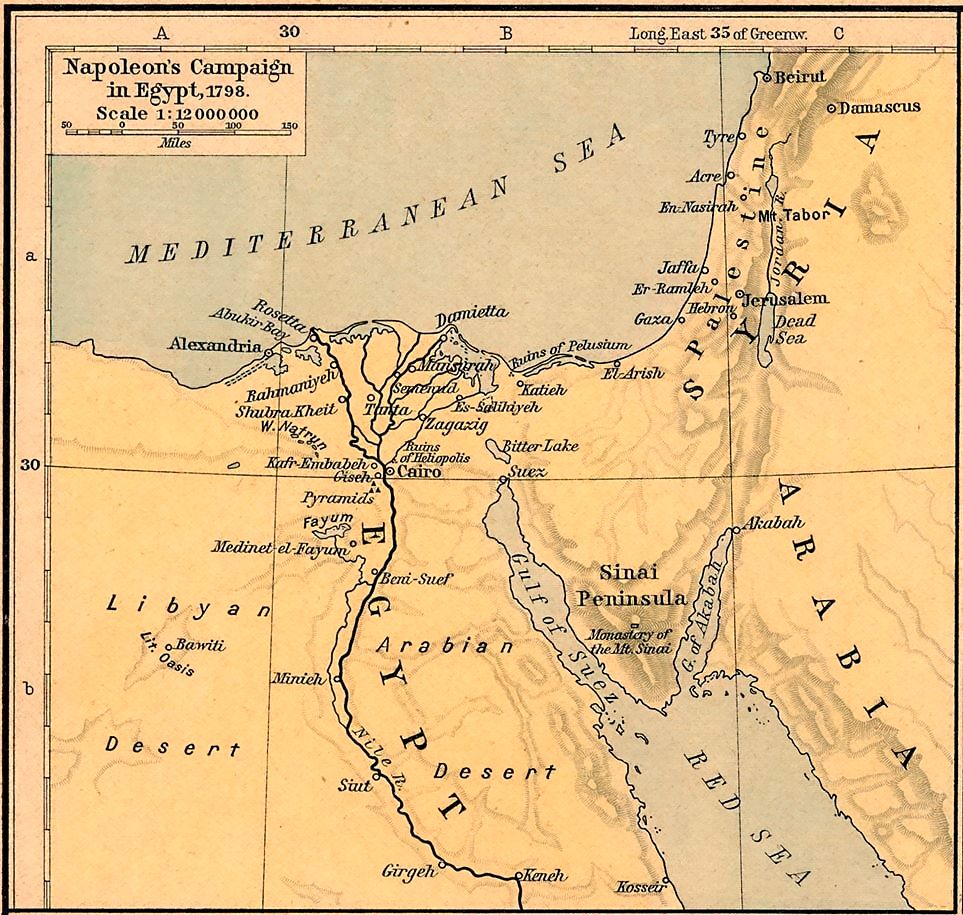
- Map of the French invasion
Date	9–10 May 1801
Location	El Rahmaniya, Ottoman Egypt
Result	Anglo-Ottoman victory

Belligerents
United Kingdom; Ottoman Empire	France

Commanders and leaders
John Hely-Hutchinson; John Stuart; Küçük Hüseyin Pasha	Joseph Lagrange

Strength
9,710	3,919

Casualties and losses
40 killed or wounded	20 killed or wounded 110 captured

The siege of El Rahmaniya was initiated by an Anglo-Ottoman force against the French troops in El Rahmaniya. After some engagements, the French troops surrendered the town to the allies.

== Background ==
Shortly after the capture of Fort Julien, British General John Hely-Hutchinson decided to take a decisive step. He pushed forward up the Nile to capture the vital crossroads at El Rahmaniya, thus cutting off the French general, Jacques-François Menou, from the interior of Egypt. The British force consisted of 5,310 men led by General John Stuart, while the Ottoman force consisted of 1,200 Albanians attached to Stuart's column, 1,100 Nizam I-Cedid, and 1,500 Bashi Bazouk, led by Küçük Hüseyin Pasha. The Allied troops received reinforcements of 600 Syrian cavalry from the Grand Vizier, although they were undisciplined and barely armed. The French force at El Rahmaniya consisted of 3,319 infantry and 600 cavalry, led by Joseph Lagrange.

== Siege ==
Hutchinson was confident in capturing El Rahmaniya; however, he was more focused on preventing the French general's escape. His first movement was to maneuver his forces to prevent his escape. Meanwhile, Stuart was planning to attack the French at Desouk. He was spotted and in turn, the French dispatched 300–400 men to attack them. The Ottoman Albanian troops engaged with the French, allowing the British to take a position along the Nile. The British and Ottoman gunboats began bombarding, although it was ineffective. The French retreated to their boats, which were covered by batteries on an island that guarded the entrance to El Rahmaniya. The British artillery engaged with the French batteries. The French ended up retreating to El Rahmaniya Harbor.

On the west bank of the Nile at noon, a French cavalry force left the town to meet the Allies. Hutchinson began forming an order of battle. The Ottomans took the left next to the river, and the British took the right and rear. The Ottomans advanced and took the front of the British right. The Battle began, and the Ottoman Syrian cavalry successfully kept the French troops in check, but the French brought forward a gun, forcing the Syrian cavalry to retreat. The British light dragoons instead came forward, and the French opened fire, and the British responded with their artillery. Neither side had the upper hand.

== Aftermath ==
Night fell and both sides stopped firing. On May 10, the rising sun revealed a white flag over the fort. Langrage had evacuated from El Rahmaniya, scuttling his remaining gunboats, throwing his artillery on the river, destroying his ammunition, and leaving 110 men to protect the sick and wounded who had surrendered to the allies. Each side had suffered more than 20 killed and wounded. Pasha was irritated that no loot had been left and regretted the capitulation that had been granted.

== Sources ==
- Stuart Reid (2021), Egypt 1801, The End of Napoleon's Eastern Empire.
- Wilson, Robert (1803). Narrative of the British Expedition to Egypt: Carefully Abridged from the History of that Campaign; with a Preliminary View of the Proceedings of the French Previous to the Arrival of the British Forces. W. Corbet.
- The Annual Register, World Events, 1801.
