= United Kingdom in the Napoleonic Wars =

United Kingdom during the Napoleonic Wars

Between 1793 and 1815, under the rule of King George III, the Kingdom of Great Britain (later the United Kingdom) was the most constant of France's enemies. Through its command of the sea, financial subsidies to allies on the European mainland, and active military intervention in the Peninsular War, Britain played a significant role in Napoleon's downfall.

== Overview ==
With the execution of King Louis XVI in 1793, the French Revolution became a contest of ideologies between the conservative, royalist Kingdom of Great Britain and its allies and radical Republican France. Napoleon, who came to power in 1799, threatened invasion of Great Britain itself, and with it, a fate similar to the countries of continental Europe that his armies had overrun. Therefore, the British invested all the money and energy it could raise into the Napoleonic Wars. French ports were blockaded by the Royal Navy.

After a relatively quiet pause from 1801 to 1803, war resumed in Europe when the British declared war on France and ended the uneasy peace maintained by the Treaty of Amiens. Napoleon's plans to invade Britain failed due to the inferiority of his navy, and in 1805, Lord Nelson's fleet decisively defeated the French and Spanish at the Battle of Trafalgar, which was the last significant naval action of the Napoleonic Wars.

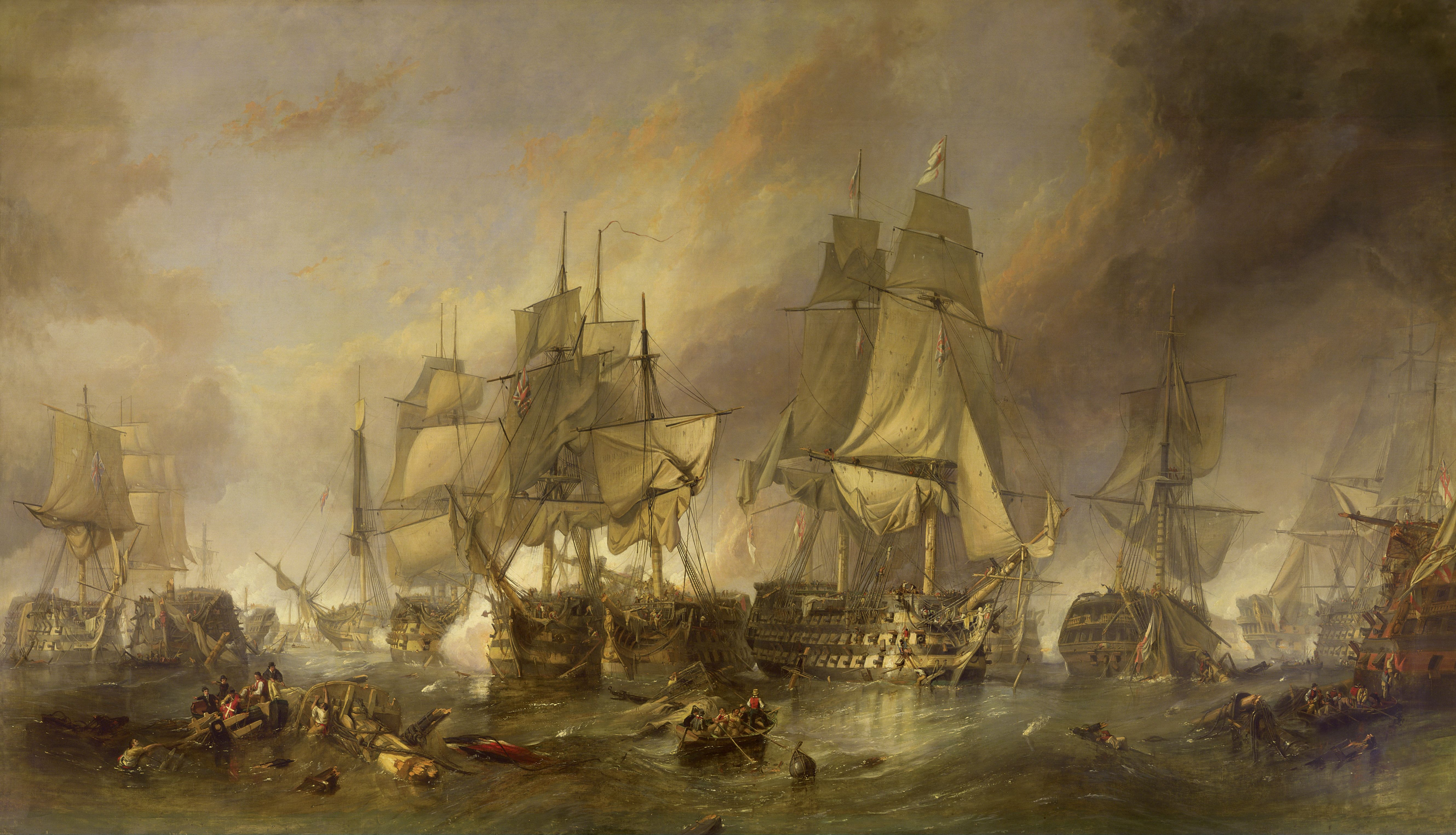
The Battle of Trafalgar by Clarkson Stanfield, 1836

The series of naval and colonial conflicts, including a large number of minor naval actions, resembled those of the French Revolutionary Wars and the preceding centuries of European warfare. Conflicts in the Caribbean, and in particular the seizure of colonial bases and islands throughout the wars, could potentially have some effect upon the European conflict. The Napoleonic conflict had reached the point at which subsequent historians could talk of a "world war". Only the Seven Years' War offered a precedent for widespread conflict on such a scale.

Napoleon also attempted economic warfare against Britain, especially in the Berlin Decree of 1806. It forbade the import of British goods into European countries allied with or dependent upon France, and installed the Continental System in Europe. All connections were to be cut, even the mail. British merchants smuggled in many goods and the Continental System was not a powerful weapon of economic war. There was some damage to Britain, especially in 1808 and 1811, but its control of the oceans helped ameliorate the damage. Even more damage was done to the economies of France and its allies, which lost a useful trading partner. Angry governments gained an incentive to ignore the Continental System, which led to the weakening of Napoleon's coalition.

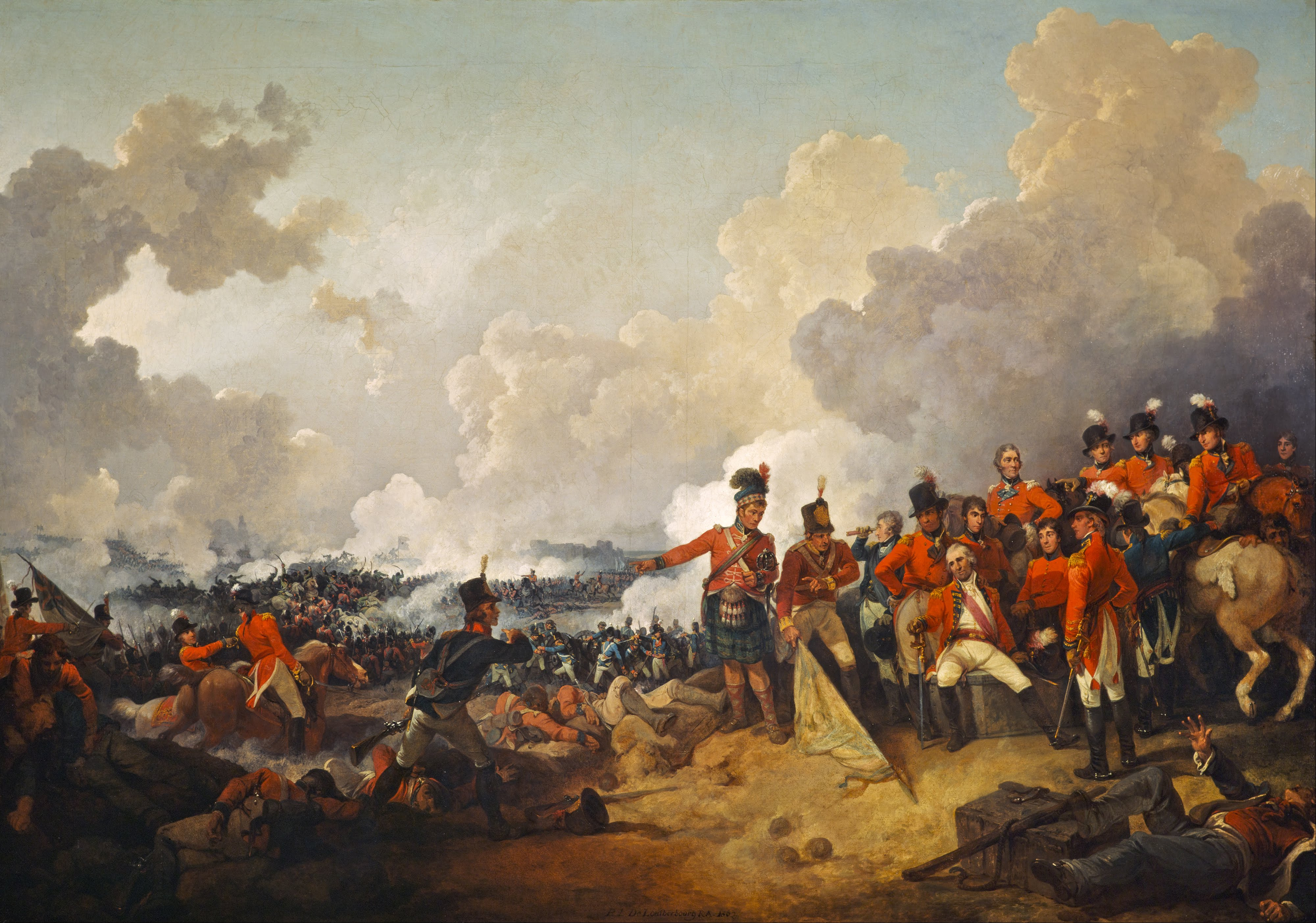
British victory over the French at the Battle of Alexandria in 1801

The British army remained a minimal threat to France; the British standing army of just 220,000 at the height of the Napoleonic Wars hardly compared to France's army of a million men—in addition to the armies of numerous allies and several hundred thousand national guardsmen that Napoleon could draft into the military if necessary. Although the Royal Navy effectively disrupted France's extra-continental trade—both by seizing and threatening French shipping and by seizing French colonial possessions—it could do nothing about France's trade with the major continental economies and posed little threat to French territory in Europe. In addition, France's population and agricultural capacity far outstripped that of Britain.

Many in the French government believed that isolating Britain from the Continent would end its economic influence over Europe and isolate it. Though the French designed the Continental System to achieve this, it never succeeded in its objective. Britain possessed the greatest industrial capacity in Europe, and its mastery of the seas allowed it to build up considerable economic strength through trade to its possessions from its rapidly expanding new empire. Britain's command of the sea meant that France could never enjoy the peace necessary to consolidate its control over Europe, and it could threaten neither the home islands nor the main British colonies.

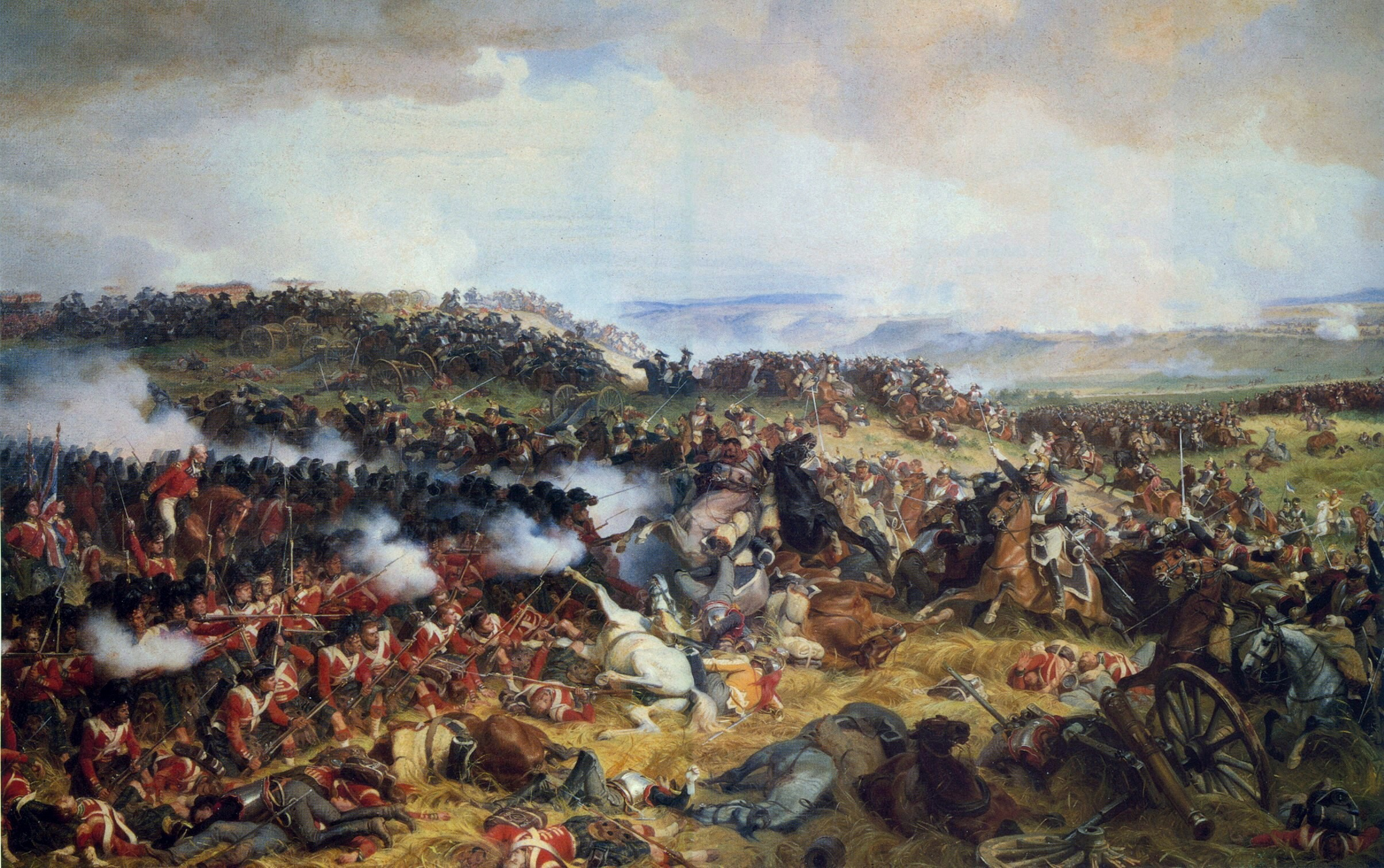
Battle of Waterloo

Sideshows like the Gunboat War against Denmark, the Walcheren Campaign against the Netherlands and the War of 1812 against the United States could not hurt Napoleon, but the Spanish uprising of 1808 at last permitted Britain to gain a foothold on the Continent. The Duke of Wellington and his army of British, Spaniards and Portuguese gradually pushed the French out of Spain and in early 1814, as Napoleon was being driven back in the east by the Prussians, Austrians, and Russians, Wellington invaded southern France. After Napoleon's surrender and exile to the island of Elba, peace appeared to have returned, but when he escaped back into France in 1815, the British and their allies had to fight him again. The armies of Wellington and Blucher defeated Napoleon once and for all at the Battle of Waterloo.

=== Civilian support network ===
Britain mobilized a vast civilian support network to support its soldiers. Historian Jenny Uglow (2015) explores a multitude of connections between the Army and its support network, as summarized by a review of her book by Christine Haynes:

a whole host of other civilian, actors, including: army contractors, who provided massive quantities of tents, knapsacks, canteens, uniforms, shoes, muskets, gunpowder, ships, maps, fortifications, meat, and biscuit; bankers and speculators, who funded the supplies as well as subsidies to Britain's allies ... revenue agents, who collected the wide variety of taxes imposed to finance the wars; farmers, whose fortunes rose and fell not just with the weather but with the war; elites, who amidst war maintained many of the same old routines and amusements; workers, when the context of war found opportunities for new jobs and higher wages but also grievances that led to strikes and riots; and the poor, who suffered immensely through much of this. ... [And women who] participated in the war not just as relations of combatants but as sutlers, prostitutes, laundresses, spinners, bandage-makers, and drawing-room news-followers.

=== Financing the war ===
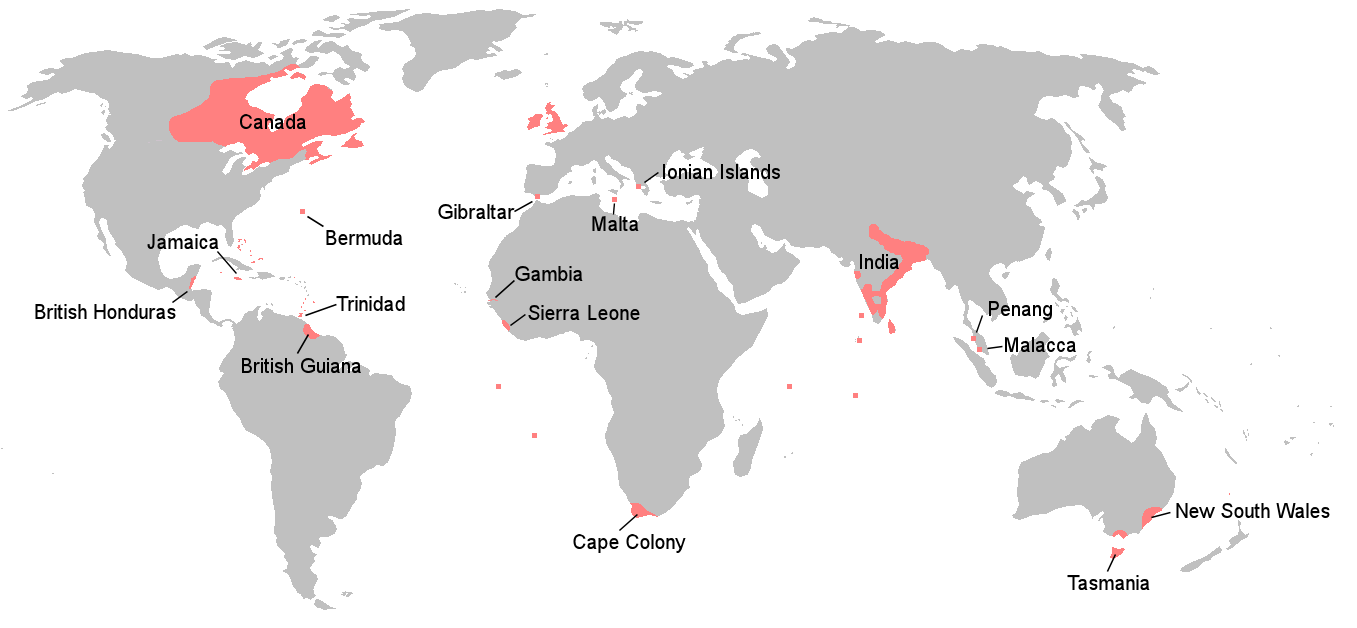
The British Empire at the end of the Napoleonic Wars in 1815

A key element in British success was its ability to mobilize the nation's industrial and financial resources and apply them to defeating France. With a population of 16 million Britain was barely half the size of France with 30 million. In terms of soldiers the French numerical advantage was offset by British subsidies that paid for a large proportion of the Austrian and Russian soldiers, peaking at about 450,000 in 1813. Most important, the British national output remained strong and the well-organized business sector channeled products into what the military needed. The system of smuggling finished products into the continent undermined French efforts to ruin the British economy by cutting off markets. The British budget in 1814 reached £66 million, including £10 million for the Navy, £40 million for the Army, £10 million for the Allies, and £38 million as interest on the national debt. The national debt soared to £679 million, more than double the GDP. It was willingly supported by hundreds of thousands of investors and tax payers, despite the higher taxes on land and a new income tax. The whole cost of the war came to £831 million. By contrast the French financial system was inadequate and Napoleon's forces had to rely in part on requisitions from conquered lands.

Total cash subsidies to Britain's allies came out to £46,289,549 from 1793 to 1814. The largest collective recipients were Portugal (10.4 million), Spain (5.1 million), Russia (5.1 million), Prussia (3.1 million), and Austria (2.4 million), with most of the remainder going to minor German states. These figures do not include the value of direct material shipments of arms and equipment such as muskets, uniforms, and food. In 1814 for example, Britain distributed about £1,582,045 worth of material on top of the £7,620,660 in cash paid the same year.

== See also ==
- Napoleon's planned invasion of the United Kingdom
- War of the First Coalition
- War of the Second Coalition
- War of the Third Coalition
- War of the Fourth Coalition
- War of the Fifth Coalition
- War of the Sixth Coalition
- War of the Seventh Coalition
