= Types of military forces in the Napoleonic Wars =

The types of military forces in the Napoleonic Wars represented the unique tactical use of distinct military units, or their origin within different European regions. By and large the military forces during the period had not changed significantly from those of the 18th century, although their employment would differ significantly.

Military forces during the Napoleonic Wars consisted largely of the three principal combat arms, and several combat support services, and included the infantry, cavalry, artillery, engineers, and logistics troops which were called the army train during the period. The period gave a start to what are today military staffs to help administer and organise forces in the field and in garrisons, and supervise training of conscripts and recruits. Much of the staff work was performed by staff officers and often aide-de-camps to senior officers, and included the officers of the quartermaster general.

== Combat arms ==
Although certain units, such as the French chasseurs, combined certain functions of light infantry (chasseurs à pied) or light cavalry (chasseurs à cheval), armies during the Napoleonic Wars were generally formed by distinct infantry, cavalry, and artillery units, each using distinctly different arms.

=== Infantry ===
Infantry relied primarily on the musket, with the bayonet used for shock attack and defense from cavalry charges. Infantry could be described as line infantry, guards, grenadiers, light infantry or skirmishers, but the roles and arms employed often overlapped between these.

Line infantry
Infantry of the line were so named for the dominant line combat formation used to deliver a volume of musket fire. Forming the bulk of the Napoleonic armies it was the primary offensive and defensive Arm available to the commanders during the period. Movement in line formation was very slow, and unless the battalion was superbly trained, a breakdown in cohesion was virtually assured, especially in any kind of uneven or wooded terrain. As a result, when movement over such terrain was required over a significant distance troops would move in columns and then deploy into line at their destination.
In addition, the line formation was vulnerable to cavalry charges, particularly from the flanks and rear, and these attacks usually resulted in the complete breakdown of cohesion and even destruction of the unit unless it was able to "form square".
Grenadiers
The grenadier units had, by the time of the Napoleonic Wars, ceased using the hand-thrown grenades, and were largely known for being composed of physically big men, sometimes veterans of previous military campaigns, frequently relied upon for shock actions. They otherwise used the same arms and tactics as the line infantry.
Light infantry
The light infantry, variously known in different armies by different names, were first introduced into the regular armies during the wars of the 18th century as irregular troops, but became permanent parts of regular Napoleonic armies either as units in their own right, or as companies in the line infantry battalions. Perceiving themselves as superior troops due to being required to engage the enemy in small groups ahead of the other troops, requiring greater initiative and skill. Light infantry were also fully trained to fight in formation and so functioned as both line and light infantry when required.
Skirmishers
Many armies contained other light troops other than the officially designated 'light infantry'. These units fought as dedicated skirmisher units ahead of the main force, such as the French Voltigeurs, German Jäger and British riflemen, with the 95th Rifles being a well-known example of the latter.

=== Cavalry ===
The cavalry of the period had retained its role from the 18th century, although the mounted grenadiers had long abandoned their grenades and only retained their names. For the most part, the cavalry were an offensive arm, either used to find the enemy, or as a manoeuvre force to deliver a physical shock to the infantry, dependent mostly on their sabres and lances for causing casualties. The largest component of all armies during the period were the dragoons, but due to lack of adequate sized horses light cavalry soon became a large part of the armies.

Heavy cavalry
Heavy cavalry were all cavalry units that mounted large horses and were used to deliver a physical shock to either enemy cavalry or infantry. They were so called from the 18th century belief that they were the deciders of the battle, always kept as a final reserve to be used to break the enemy ranks. Although many still wore the cuirass, and therefore many regiments were called cuirassiers during the previous century, and were descendants of armoured cavalry before them, many, like the carabiniers did not, and were later referred by writers as "heavy cavalry" for the size of their horses.
Dragoons
Dragoons were the less glamorous but most numerically significant part of the cavalry arm, with origins as mounted infantry. During the period dragoons were frequently used in the battle cavalry role in addition to their traditional role. They were also equipped with either carbines or the characteristically long dragoon musket.
Light cavalry
Light cavalry were utilised for their speed and agility functioning primarily as reconnaissance and screening troops. They were also used for skirmishing, raiding and communications. Many light cavalry types evolved flamboyant uniforms, particularly the hussars, which had originated in Hungary and continued to be recruited from there by the army of Austria. By the time of the wars, units consisting of or modeled after hussars were found in all armies. Irregular Cossack cavalry were of great use to the Russian army in harassing the enemy lines of communication and conducting raids.
Lancers
Lancer cavalry, known in many armies as uhlans, were exclusive to a few armies at the beginning of the wars but came to be used by nearly all the combatant nations as the wars progressed. They were valued for the significant advantage they had in a charge due to the long reach of the lance which allowed them gain first strike at enemy cavalry and infantry alike, though they were highly vulnerable if forced into a near stationary melee. Frequently used as an anti-cavalry force.

=== Artillery ===
Artillery of the Napoleonic Wars continued to use the cannon and howitzers of the previous century. These were smooth-bore, heavy, cast artillery pieces moved by limbers, usually at a slow pace.

Siege artillery
Siege artillery were very heavy cannon, howitzer and mortar artillery pieces used to force surrender of fortresses during a siege.
Field artillery
Field artillery usually employed cannon and howitzers to fire directly into visible enemy troops, firing either ball or canister ammunition measured in the weight of the cannon ball (in pounds). The heavier pieces were sometimes known as "position artillery" and were deployed in the same position for the duration of the battle due to the difficulty of moving them.

Horse artillery
Artillery in which the crews rode rather than walked with their pieces became known as horse artillery, and was also an innovation of the previous century, but became more widespread during the Napoleonic Wars. Usually attached to the cavalry units to provide them with supporting fire from smaller cannon than their field artillery counterparts.

== Support services ==
Support services were all the multitude of troops that ensured the combat arms could manoeuvre and fight.

Administrative staffs
The administrative staffs of the armies were largely responsible for the operational matters relating to the conduct of campaigns such as obtaining intelligence, transmitting orders, and ensuring the delivery of ammunition to troops.
Quartermaster staffs
The quartermaster staffs during the period were largely responsible for ensuring the armies had adequate living quarters and provisions (water, food and clothing) for troops and animals to continue the campaign. They also often served in the intelligence gathering capacity as scouts due to their need to be located somewhat ahead of the marching troops when surveying the locations for suitable camp-sites or bivouacs.

Engineers
Usually part of the artillery arm, the military engineers were responsible for the building and destruction of field defences, conduct of sieges, and construction and demolition of bridges.
Pontonniers
The pontonniers continued in their 18th century role of erecting pontoons to cross rivers where no bridge was available, or where one had been destroyed.

Sappers
Sappers, also known as pioneers, were originally the troops that were used for digging trenches and fortifications during sieges. By the time of the Napoleonic Wars a detachment of sappers was usually serving with infantry and cavalry regiments to help with demolition of gates and fences to allow easier movement by these units. Sappers were chosen for their large size and physical strength. A distinctive piece of equipment of a sapper was the axe, usually a double-handed implement with a broad head.
Miners
Less well known during the period, the miners had a long history, and were used to mine the tunnels during sieges in which the explosive charges were emplaced to demolish parts of the fortification's wall, creating a breach.

The army train
The army train was the Service that ensured, with varying degree of efficiency during the period, of delivering to the troops everything they could not carry themselves. Often divided among the regimental and general trains, the French Service was considered the best in Europe during the period.
Medical services
Although the military medical services were rudimentary during the Wars, they existed, and the experience of military doctors and surgeons during the conflicts contributed significantly to advancement of medical science later in the century.

== Irregular troops ==
Although arguably the best known of the troops that did not serve as permanent parts of the Napoleonic armies were the Cossacks, almost all major armies of the period employed these, with the Spanish guerrilleros later giving their name to a new form of guerrilla warfare.

== See also ==
- Army of Spain (Peninsular War)
- British Army during the Napoleonic Wars
- Grande Armée
