= Siege of Alexandria (1801) =

1801 battle of the French invasion of Egypt and Syria

- Part of the French invasion of Egypt and Syria
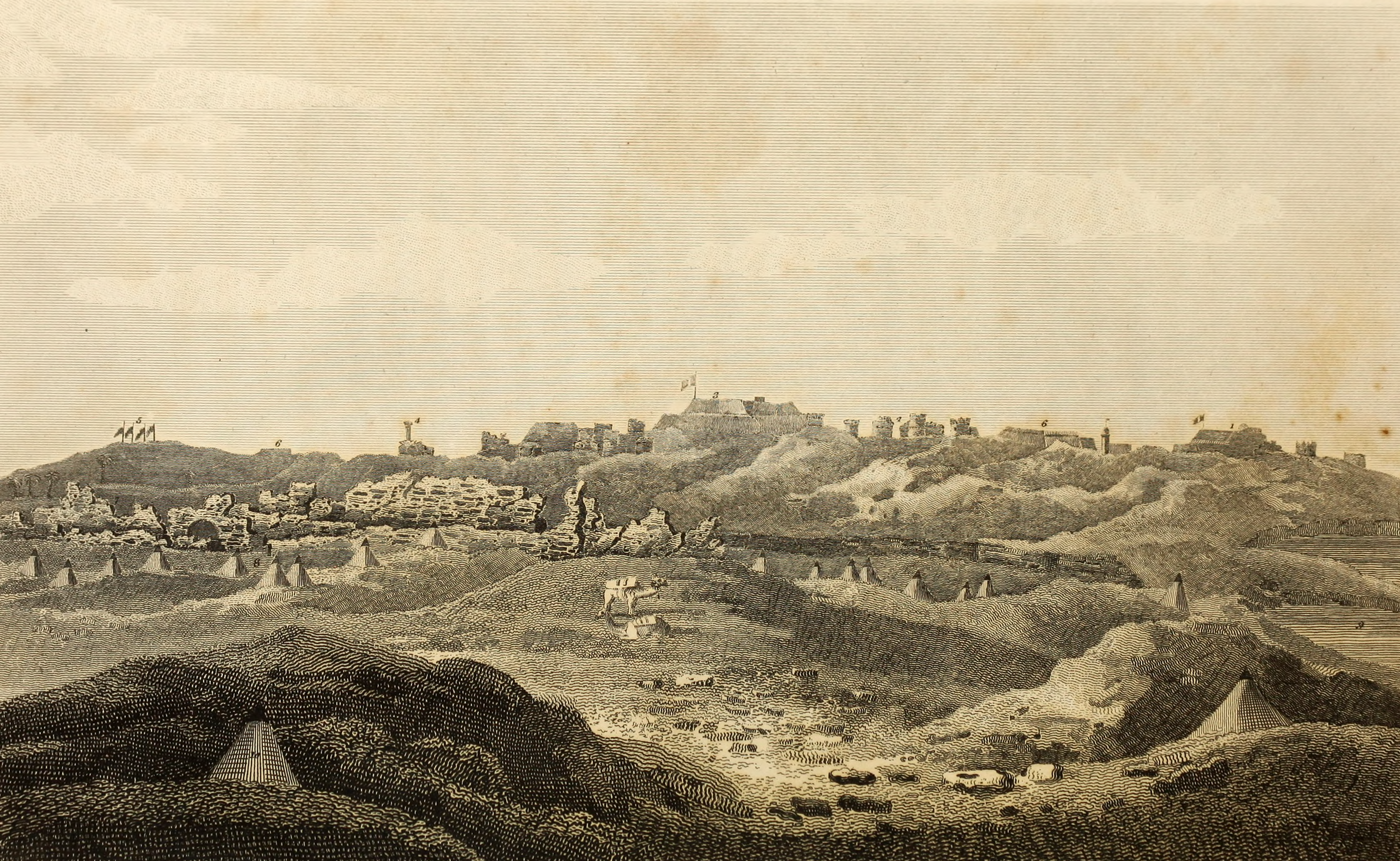
- French fortifications east of Alexandria during the siege
Date	17 August – 2 September 1801
Location	Alexandria, Ottoman Egypt 31°12′16″N 29°52′48″E
Result	British victory

Belligerents
United Kingdom	France

Commanders and leaders
John Hely-Hutchinson	Jacques Menou (surrendered)

Strength
20,000	13,000; 5 frigates 3 corvettes 1 hospital ship

Casualties and losses
Unknown	2,000 died of disease 10,000 captured 5 frigates captured 3 corvettes captured 1 hospital ship captured

War of the Second Coalition:
Egypt and Syria
current battle
Napoleon in command till 23 August 1799

The siege of Alexandria (17 August – 2 September 1801) was fought during the French Revolutionary Wars between French and British forces. It was the last action of the French invasion of Egypt and Syria (1798–1801). The French had occupied Alexandria, a major fortified harbour city on the Nile Delta in northern Egypt, since 2 July 1798, and the garrison there surrendered on 2 September 1801.

== Background ==
The battle between the British and French at Canope on 21 March 1801 resulted in a French repulse. The French under Menou, disheartened by this failure, retired to Alexandria. With Abercromby's death, John Hely-Hutchinson succeeded as commander of the British force in August. He now intended to lay siege to Alexandria and bottle Menou up.

Hutchinson left Coote with 6,000 men and then sent part of the reserve with Baron Charles de Hompesch to capture Rosetta. He then advanced to Cairo, which he reached, after a few skirmishes, in mid June. Joined by a sizable Ottoman force, Hutchinson invested Cairo and on 27 June the 13,000-strong French garrison under General Augustin Daniel Belliard, out-manned and out-gunned, surrendered. General John Moore then escorted them to the coast via Rosetta.

== Siege ==
Hutchinson, with Cairo out of the way, now began the final reduction of Alexandria. He had thirty five battalions in total. While the reserve feinted to the east, Coote, with the Guards and two other brigades, landed on 16 August to its west where fierce opposition was encountered by the garrison of Fort Marabout, which the 54th Regiment of Foot eventually stormed. Both sides mounted combined assaults but the French soldiers, unable to break out and with food shortages and disease taking their toll, became increasingly disillusioned with the campaign. Menou knew he had no hope and on 26 August asked for terms; on 26 August he proposed formal terms of capitulation. The terms as amended by British commanders and put into effect are known as the Capitulation of Alexandria.

== Aftermath ==
By 2 September, 10,000 French troops surrendered under terms which allowed them to keep their personal weapons and baggage, and to return to France on British ships. However, all French ships and cannons at Alexandria were surrendered to the victors. French warships captured in the harbour were divided between the British and Ottomans. The frigates Égyptienne, Régénérée and Léoben went to Britain, while the frigates Justice and Mantoue, hospital ship Causse and corvettes Halil Bey, Momgo Balerie and Salâbetnümâ went to the Ottomans.

Historians relate that the French garrison, feeling abandoned by an uncaring Republic, gradually abandoned the high standards of conduct and service characteristic of the French Revolutionary Army. Many soldiers refused to renew their oath to the Republic, or did so half-heartedly. In his memoirs, the surgeon-in-chief of Napoleon's Grand Army, Baron Dominique-Jean Larrey, remembers how the consumption of the meat of young Arab horses helped the French to curb an epidemic of scurvy. He would so start the 19th-century tradition of horse meat consumption in France.

== The Rosetta Stone ==
After the surrender, a dispute arose over the fate of French archaeological and scientific discoveries in Egypt. One of the key artifacts was the Rosetta Stone which had been discovered in mid-July 1799 by French scientists of the Institut d'Égypte. Menou refused to hand them over, claiming they belonged to the institute. How exactly the stone came into British hands is disputed. Colonel Tomkyns Hilgrove Turner, who escorted the stone to Britain, claimed later that he had personally seized it from Menou and carried it away on a gun carriage. Turner brought the stone to Britain aboard Egyptienne, landing in February 1802. On 11 March it was presented to the Society of Antiquaries of London. Later it was taken to the British Museum, where it remains to this day. Inscriptions painted in white on the artifact state "Captured in Egypt by the British Army in 1801" on the left side and "Presented by King George III" on the right.

== Order of battle ==
Siege of Alexandria Order of Battle
Force	Brigade	Unit	Size	Ref.
Western Force; Major-General Eyre Coote	Brigade of Guards; Major-General Lord Cavan	Coldstream Guards	552	
Western Force; Major-General Eyre Coote	Brigade of Guards; Major-General Lord Cavan	Third Guards	590	
Western Force; Major-General Eyre Coote	1st Brigade; Major-General George Ludlow	25th Regiment of Foot	526	
Western Force; Major-General Eyre Coote	1st Brigade; Major-General George Ludlow	1st Battalion, 27th Regiment of Foot	538	
Western Force; Major-General Eyre Coote	1st Brigade; Major-General George Ludlow	2nd Battalion, 27th Regiment of Foot	465	
Western Force; Major-General Eyre Coote	1st Brigade; Major-General George Ludlow	44th Regiment of Foot	334	
Western Force; Major-General Eyre Coote	2nd Brigade; Major-General Edward Finch	2nd Battalion, 1st Regiment of Foot	352	
Western Force; Major-General Eyre Coote	2nd Brigade; Major-General Edward Finch	26th Regiment of Foot	438	
Western Force; Major-General Eyre Coote	2nd Brigade; Major-General Edward Finch	1st Battalion, 54th Regiment of Foot	381	
Western Force; Major-General Eyre Coote	2nd Brigade; Major-General Edward Finch	2nd Battalion, 54th Regiment of Foot	384	
Eastern Force; Lieutenant-General John Hely-Hutchinson	3rd (Foreign) Brigade; Brigadier-General John Stuart	Stuart's (Minorca) Regiment	690	
Eastern Force; Lieutenant-General John Hely-Hutchinson	3rd (Foreign) Brigade; Brigadier-General John Stuart	De Roll's Regiment	383	
Eastern Force; Lieutenant-General John Hely-Hutchinson	3rd (Foreign) Brigade; Brigadier-General John Stuart	Dillon's Regiment	393	
Eastern Force; Lieutenant-General John Hely-Hutchinson	3rd (Foreign) Brigade; Brigadier-General John Stuart	Watteville's Regiment	572	
Eastern Force; Lieutenant-General John Hely-Hutchinson	4th Brigade; Brigadier-General John Hope	8th Regiment of Foot	285	
Eastern Force; Lieutenant-General John Hely-Hutchinson	4th Brigade; Brigadier-General John Hope	18th Regiment of Foot	293	
Eastern Force; Lieutenant-General John Hely-Hutchinson	4th Brigade; Brigadier-General John Hope	79th Regiment of Foot	434	
Eastern Force; Lieutenant-General John Hely-Hutchinson	4th Brigade; Brigadier-General John Hope	90th Regiment of Foot	437	
Eastern Force; Lieutenant-General John Hely-Hutchinson	5th Brigade; Brigadier-General John Doyle	30th Regiment of Foot	269	
Eastern Force; Lieutenant-General John Hely-Hutchinson	5th Brigade; Brigadier-General John Doyle	50th Regiment of Foot	337	
Eastern Force; Lieutenant-General John Hely-Hutchinson	5th Brigade; Brigadier-General John Doyle	89th Regiment of Foot	311	
Eastern Force; Lieutenant-General John Hely-Hutchinson	5th Brigade; Brigadier-General John Doyle	92nd Regiment of Foot	414	
Eastern Force; Lieutenant-General John Hely-Hutchinson	6th Brigade; Brigadier-General John Blake	1st Battalion, 20th Regiment of Foot	604	
Eastern Force; Lieutenant-General John Hely-Hutchinson	6th Brigade; Brigadier-General John Blake	2nd Battalion, 20th Regiment of Foot	484	
Eastern Force; Lieutenant-General John Hely-Hutchinson	6th Brigade; Brigadier-General John Blake	24th Regiment of Foot	438	
Eastern Force; Lieutenant-General John Hely-Hutchinson	6th Brigade; Brigadier-General John Blake	Ancient Irish Fencibles	420	
Eastern Force; Lieutenant-General John Hely-Hutchinson	Reserve; Major-General John Moore; Brigadier-General Hildebrand Oakes	2nd Regiment of Foot	327	
Eastern Force; Lieutenant-General John Hely-Hutchinson	Reserve; Major-General John Moore; Brigadier-General Hildebrand Oakes	28th Regiment of Foot	338	
Eastern Force; Lieutenant-General John Hely-Hutchinson	Reserve; Major-General John Moore; Brigadier-General Hildebrand Oakes	42nd Regiment of Foot	490	
Eastern Force; Lieutenant-General John Hely-Hutchinson	Reserve; Major-General John Moore; Brigadier-General Hildebrand Oakes	58th Regiment of Foot	238	
Eastern Force; Lieutenant-General John Hely-Hutchinson	Reserve; Major-General John Moore; Brigadier-General Hildebrand Oakes	40th Regiment of Foot flank companies	146	
Eastern Force; Lieutenant-General John Hely-Hutchinson	Reserve; Major-General John Moore; Brigadier-General Hildebrand Oakes	23rd Regiment of Foot	343	
Eastern Force; Lieutenant-General John Hely-Hutchinson	Reserve; Major-General John Moore; Brigadier-General Hildebrand Oakes	Hompesch's Hussars	397	
Eastern Force; Lieutenant-General John Hely-Hutchinson	Reserve; Major-General John Moore; Brigadier-General Hildebrand Oakes	Chasseurs Britanniques	595	
Eastern Force; Lieutenant-General John Hely-Hutchinson	Reserve; Major-General John Moore; Brigadier-General Hildebrand Oakes	Corsican Rangers	60	
Eastern Force; Lieutenant-General John Hely-Hutchinson	Cavalry	26th Light Dragoons		
Rosetta Force	Cavalry	11th Light Dragoons		
Rosetta Force	Cavalry	12th Light Dragoons		
Rosetta Force	Cavalry	22nd Light Dragoons		
Rosetta Force	Infantry	13th Regiment of Foot		
