= John Stuart (British Army officer, born 1759) =

Lieutenant-General Sir John Stuart GCB
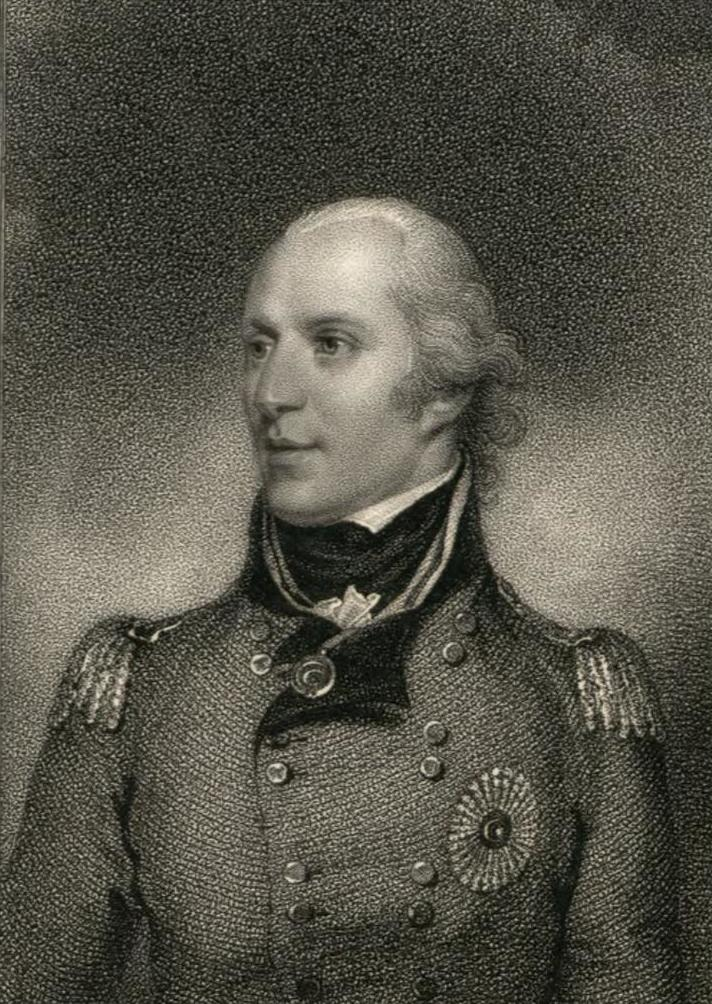
- Engraved portrait by Anthony Cardon
- Born: 1759; Province of Georgia
- Died: 2 April 1815 (aged 55–56); Clifton, Bristol
- Military career
- Allegiance: Great Britain; United Kingdom
- Branch: British Army
- Service years: 1778–1815
- Rank: Lieutenant-general
- Conflicts: American War of Independence; French Revolutionary and Napoleonic Wars; Battle of Maida
- Awards: Grand Cross of the Order of the Bath

Lieutenant-General Sir John Stuart, Count of Maida, GCB (1759 – 2 April 1815) was a British Army officer who served in the French Revolutionary and Napoleonic Wars.

== Biography ==
Stuart was born in Georgia, the son of Colonel John Stuart, superintendent of Indian affairs in the southern district, and a prominent loyalist in the War of Independence. Educated at Westminster School, young Stuart entered the 3rd Foot Guards in 1778, and almost immediately returned to America with his regiment. He was present at the siege of Charleston, the battles of Camden and Guilford court-house, and the surrender of Yorktown, returning a regimental lieutenant and an army captain, as was then usual in the Guards.

Ten years later, as captain and lieutenant-colonel, he was present with the Duke of York's army in the Netherlands and in northern France. He took part in the sieges and battles of the 1793 campaign, Valenciennes, Lincelles, Dunkirk and Lannoy. The following year, now at the head of his battalion, he was present at Landrecies and at Pont-a-Chin or Tournay, and when the tide turned against the allies, he shared with his guards in the discomforts of the retreat. As a brigadier-general he served in Portugal in 1796, and in Minorca in 1799. At Alexandria, in 1801, his handling of his brigade called forth special commendation in general orders, and a year later he became substantive major-general. He then went on to take part in the siege of Cairo and following this the final action in Egypt with the surrender of Alexandria.

After two years in command of a brigade in Kent, Stuart went with Sir James Craig to the Mediterranean. The British were employed, along with Lacy's Russians, in the defence of the kingdom of Naples but Austerlitz led to the recall of the Russian contingent, and the British soon afterwards evacuated Italy. Thus exposed, Naples fell to the advancing troops of Masséna but Gaeta still held out for King Ferdinand and Masséna's main force became locked up in the siege of this fortress. Stuart, who was in temporary command, realized the weakness of the French position in Calabria and on 1 July 1806 swiftly disembarked all his available forces in the Gulf of Saint Euphemia. On the 4th the British force, 4,800 strong, won the celebrated victory of Maida over Reynier's army. After this success, Stuart marched south and after a series of minor skirmishes, returned to Sicily as he felt his force was too weak to go onto a full offensive against Masséna's foothold in Naples. After besieging and taking the castle of Scylla, the force returned to Messina. Besides the dignity of Count of Maida from the court of Palermo, Stuart received the thanks of parliament and an annuity of £1,000, as well as the KCB. Superseded by two other generals, Henry Fox and John Moore, the latter of whom was his junior, Stuart came home in 1806.

A year later, now a lieutenant-general, he received the Mediterranean command which he held until 1810. His operations were confined to south Italy where Murat, king of Naples, held the mainland whereas the British and Sicilian troops (along with some Neapolitan exiles) held Sicily for the Bourbon king. Of the events of this time may be mentioned the failure to relieve Colonel Hudson Lowe at Capri, the expedition against Murat's gunboats in the bay of Naples and the second siege of Scylla. The various attempts made by Murat to cross the straits uniformly failed, though on one occasion the French actually obtained a footing in the island. A. G. Macdonell in his 1934 book Napoleon and His Marshals describes Stuart as "a dawdling, incompetent and evil-minded man". In 1810 Stuart returned to England. He died at Clifton on 2 April 1815. Two months previously he had received the Grand Cross of the Order of the Bath (GCB).

== Notes ==
Military offices
Preceded by Charles Leigh	Colonel of the 20th (the East Devonshire) Regiment of Foot; 1809–1815	Succeeded by William Houston
Preceded by The Lord Hutchison	Colonel of the 74th (Highland) Regiment of Foot; 1806–1809	Succeeded by Alexander Hope
