= Achilles (ship) =

Several ships have been named Achilles for Achilles:

- Achilles (1781 ship) was a merchant vessel launched at Sunderland in 1781. She traded widely, particularly to the West Indies. She made one voyage for the British East India Company (EIC). She was also the victor in 1799 in a sanguinary single-ship action against a French privateer. She herself fell victim in 1801 to a French privateer.
- Achilles (1799 ship) was built at Sunderland in 1799. Although early on she made some voyages to the West Indies, she spent most of her mercantile career trading with the Baltic and northern Russia, and as a coaster. However, between about 1810 and 1814, she served as a transport under Transport Board. She suffered three maritime mishaps before 1835 and assisted at a fourth. She was lengthened in 1835. Her crew abandoned her in October 1839 and she subsequently foundered.
- Achilles (1813 ship) was launched in 1813 at Shields. She sailed from Shields to London and then operated for some years as a transport. She then traded more generally. In 1820 new owners moved her to Dundee. She became a whaler in the British northern whale fishery until she was lost there in 1830.

== See also ==
- HMS Achilles – any one of six vessels of the British Royal Navy
- HMS Achille – any one of four vessels of the British Royal Navy
