= List of shipwrecks in October 1839 =

The list of shipwrecks in October 1839 includes ships sunk, foundered, wrecked, grounded, or otherwise lost during October 1839.

== 1 October ==
List of shipwrecks: 1 October 1839
Ship	State	Description
Indus	United Kingdom	The ship was driven ashore at Ardrossan, Ayrshire. She was on a voyage from Greenock, Renfrewshire to Pictou, Nova Scotia, British North America.

== 2 October ==
List of shipwrecks: 2 October 1839
Ship	State	Description
Casador	Portugal	The brig was wrecked on Hainan, China.
Fanny	United Kingdom	The ship ran aground on the Drumroe Bank, in the Irish Sea off the coast of County Waterford. She was on a voyage from Miramichi, New Brunswick, British North America to Waterford
Horace	France	The ship ran aground near New Orleans, Louisiana, United States. She was on a voyage from Bordeaux, Gironde to New Orleans.
Isabella	United Kingdom	The ship sprang a leak and foundered off the Mull of Galloway. Her crew were rescued.
Mary Anderson	United Kingdom	The schooner ran aground on the Drumroe Bank and was severely damaged. She was on a voyage from Limerick to Glasgow, Renfrewshire. Mary Anderson was refloated on 6 October.
Sunda	United Kingdom	The ship was beached on Hainan, China with the loss of seventeen of the 32 people on board. She was on a voyage from London to China.
Tobacco Plant	United States	The whaler was reported to have been destroyed by fire in the Torres Straits. Some of her crew were rescued by HMS Herald (Royal Navy). Those rescued may have been mutineers who had abandoned the ship.

== 3 October ==
List of shipwrecks: 3 October 1839
Ship	State	Description
Carl	United Kingdom	The ship ran aground at Gothenburg, Sweden and was damaged. She was on a voyage from Gothenburg to Newcastle upon Tyne, Northumberland. Carl was later refloated and taken into Gothenburg.
Dovecot	United Kingdom	The ship was driven ashore on Guardian Island. She was on a voyage from Cephalonia, United States of the Ionian Islands to Hull, Yorkshire. Dovecot was refloated on 8 October and resumed her voyage.
Fanny	France	The ship was wrecked on Anegada a Fuero with the loss of two lives. She was on a voyage from Bordeaux, Gironde to Veracruz, Mexico.
Frithiof	Denmark	The schooner was wrecked at Tornby. Her crew were rescued. She was on a voyage from Newcastle upon Tyne to Copenhagen.
May	United Kingdom	The ship was wrecked on Sully Island, Glamorgan. Her crew were rescued. She was on a voyage from Minehead, Somerset to Cardiff, Glamorgan.
Mary	United Kingdom	The ship ran aground on the Drungroe Bank. She was on a voyage from Limerick to Glasgow, Renfrewshire.
Myrtle	United Kingdom	The ship was wrecked near Wicklow. Her crew were rescued.

== 4 October ==
List of shipwrecks: 4 October 1839
Ship	State	Description
Alice Crowther	United Kingdom	The ship was wrecked on South Island, Cocos Islands. She was on a voyage from Manila, Spanish East Indies to Cork.
Betsey, or Eliza	United Kingdom	The ship was run down and sunk in the North Sea off West Runton, Norfolk with the loss of a crew member.
Carib	United Kingdom	The ship was driven ashore and damaged at Sellery Cove, Lower Canada, British North America. She was on a voyage from Dublin to Quebec City, Lower Canada.
Ceres	(United Kingdom of Great Britain and Ireland) British North America	The ship was wrecked at Grand Étang, Nova Scotia.
Ellen Murray	United Kingdom	The ship ran aground on the Sheelocksand, in the North Sea off the coast of Zeeland, Netherlands. She was on a voyage from Newcastle upon Tyne, Northumberland to Vlissingen, Zeeland. Ellen Murray was refloated on 6 October and taken into Hellevoetsluis, Zeeland.
Industry	United Kingdom	The ship sprang a leak and foundered in the Atlantic Ocean off the north coast of Cornwall. Her crew were rescued.
Lord Huntley	United Kingdom	The ship was driven ashore and wrecked at Wicklow. Her crew were rescued.
Manly	United Kingdom	The ship was wrecked on Spurn Point, Yorkshire with the loss of two of her crew. She was on a voyage from Bermuda to Goole, Yorkshire. Manly was refloated on 6 October and beached at Theddlethorpe, Lincolnshire.
Marianne et Marie	France	The ship ran aground at Cherbourg, Seine-Inférieure. She was on a voyage from Sunderland, County Durham, United Kingdom to Cette, Hérault.
Mary	United Kingdom	The ship was driven ashore at St. Mary's, Isles of Scilly.
Sarah	Netherlands	The ship ran aground on the Sheelocksand. She was on a voyage from Batavia, Netherlands East Indies to Vlissingen.
William	United Kingdom	The ship was driven ashore in the Isles of Scilly. She was refloated on 15 October and taken into St. Mary's.
York	United Kingdom	The ship struck a sunken wreck off The Casquets, Channel Islands. She put back to Guernsey.

== 5 October ==
List of shipwrecks: October 1839
Ship	State	Description
Equitable	United Kingdom	The barque was wrecked at Fultah Point, India. Her crew were rescued. She was on a voyage from Calcutta, India to Sydney, New South Wales.
Jager	United Kingdom	The ship was driven ashore and severely damaged at Collier Hope, Yorkshire. She was on a voyage from King's Lynn, Norfolk to Whitby, Yorkshire.. Jager was refloated.
Leonidas	United Kingdom	The ship was sighted off Margate, Kent whilst on a voyage from London to Ghent, East Flanders, Belgium. No further trace, presumed foundered in the North Sea with the loss of all hands.
Lord Howick	United Kingdom	The ship was driven ashore at Burnham Overy Staithe, Norfolk. She was on a voyage from Goole, Yorkshire to London.
May	United Kingdom	The ship was wrecked in the Isles of Scilly.
Myrtle	United Kingdom	The ship was driven ashore and wrecked at Greystones, County Wicklow.
Rover	United Kingdom	The ship sank at Fishguard, Pembrokeshire. She was on a voyage from Whitehaven, Cumberland to Cardiff, Glamorgan.

== 6 October ==
List of shipwrecks: 6 October 1839
Ship	State	Description
Charlotte	Norway	The ship was driven ashore east of Ostend, West Flanders, Belgium.
Henry	United Kingdom	The ship ran aground on McCall's Flats, in the Mississippi River. She was on a voyage from Liverpool, Lancashire to New Orleans, Louisiana, United States.
Washington	United States	The ship was wrecked at "New Zalet". Her crew were rescued. She was on a voyage from New York to Wilmington, Delaware and Berbice.

== 7 October ==
List of shipwrecks: 7 October 1839
Ship	State	Description
Brankenmoor	United Kingdom	The ship ran aground on the Nore. She was on a voyage from Saint Petersburg, Russia to London. Brankenmoor was refloated on 9 October and taken in tow.

== 8 October ==
List of shipwrecks: 8 October 1839
Ship	State	Description
Nonaritum	United Kingdom	The ship ran aground in the Mississippi River. She was on a voyage from Liverpool, Lancashire to New Orleans, Louisiana, United States.
Sophia Smith	United Kingdom	The ship was wrecked in the Baltic Sea off the coast of Sweden. Her crew were rescued. She was on a voyage from Saint Petersburg, Russia to Hull, Yorkshire.
Staffa	United Kingdom	The ship departed from Sierra Leone for London. No further trace, presumed foundered with the loss of all hands.

== 9 October ==
List of shipwrecks: 9 October 1839
Ship	State	Description
Frances Charlotte	United Kingdom	The barque was wrecked on "Naungatan Island", in the Mindora Sea. Her crew were rescued. She was on a voyage from Manila, Spanish East Indies to Sydney, New South Wales.

== 11 October ==
List of shipwrecks: 11 October 1839
Ship	State	Description
Elisabeth	France	The whaler was driven ashore and severely damaged in Encounter Bay. She was later refloated and taken into Hobart, Van Diemen's Land.
Industry	United Kingdom	The ship was driven ashore at Blyth Northumberland. She was on a voyage from Great Yarmouth, Norfolk to Blyth. Industry was refloated and taken into Blyth.
Svyatoy Nikolay (Святой Николай, 'St. Nicholas')	Imperial Russian Navy	The transport ship ran aground and foundered at the mouth of the Sulina branch of the Danube. Her crew were rescued. She was on a voyage from Nikolayev to Izmail. Svyatoy Nikolay was subsequently dismantled.
Thornton	United Kingdom	The ship foundered in the English Channel 15 nautical miles (28 km) south south west of Littlehampton, Sussex. Her crew were rescued. She was on a voyage from Newport, Monmouthshire to Gainsborough, Lincolnshire.
Victoria	(United Kingdom of Great Britain and Ireland) New South Wales	The ship was driven ashore and severely damaged in Encounter Bay.

== 12 October ==
List of shipwrecks: 12 October 1839
Ship	State	Description
Henry Coates	United Kingdom	The brig was driven ashore on Anholt, Denmark. She was on a voyage from Danzig to London. Henry Coates was refloated and put into Hakefjord before continuing her voyage.
Leopold I	Belgium	The ship departed from Vlissingen, Zeeland, Netherlands for Hamburg. No further trace, presumed foundered with the loss of all hands.
Nelly	France	The ship sank at Hubberstone, Glamorgan, United Kingdom.

== 13 October ==
List of shipwrecks: October 1839
Ship	State	Description
Maria Theresa	France	The schooner ran aground on the Woolpack Sand, in the North Sea and was wrecked. Her crew were rescued. She was on a voyage from Sunderland, County Durham, United Kingdom to Rouen, Seine-Inférieure.
Princess Victoria	United Kingdom	The ship was driven ashore at Helsingør, Denmark. She was on a voyage from Saint Petersburg, Russia to Newhaven, Sussex. Princess Victoria was refloated on 15 October and taken into Helsingør.
Shamrock	United Kingdom	The ship was driven ashore at "Ballynagowl", County Waterford. She was on a voyage from Youghal, County Cork to Bristol, Gloucestershire.

== 14 October ==
List of shipwrecks: October 1839
Ship	State	Description
David Howe Lambert	United Kingdom	The ship was driven ashore and wrecked in Clonakilty Bay. Her crew were rescued.
Eliza	United Kingdom	The ship ran aground at King's Lynn, Norfolk. She was on a voyage from Saint Petersburg, Russia to King's Lynn.
Judith	United Kingdom	The ship ran aground on the Skitter Sand, in the Humber. She was on a voyage from Hull, Yorkshire to Saint Petersburg. Judith was refloated the next day and resumed her voyage.
Madras	United Kingdom	The ship ran aground off the coast of County Limerick.
Mary	United Kingdom	The ship departed from British Honduras for Liverpool, Lancashire. No further trace, presumed foundered with the loss of all hands.
Robert and Betsey	United Kingdom	The ship ran aground at King's Lynn. She was on a voyage from Blyth, Northumberland to King's Lynn.

== 15 October ==
List of shipwrecks: 15 October 1839
Ship	State	Description
Martha Caire	(United Kingdom of Great Britain and Ireland) Guernsey	The ship was in collision with Bencoolen (United Kingdom) and foundered in the English Channel. Her crew were rescued by Bencoolen. Martha Caire was on a voyage from Málaga, Spain to Guernsey.

== 16 October ==
List of shipwrecks: 16 October 1839
Ship	State	Description
Delphin	Norway	The ship departed from London, United Kingdom for Christiansand. No further trace, presumed foundered with the loss of all hands.
Fenwick	United Kingdom	The ship was driven ashore on Gotland, Sweden. Her crew were rescued. She was on a voyage from "Wyburg" to Hull, Yorkshire.
Sir John Tobin	United Kingdom	The ship was wrecked on the Warrington Reef. She was on a voyage from Antigua to Liverpool, Lancashire.
Union	(United Kingdom of Great Britain and Ireland) British North America	The ship sprang a leak and was abandoned in the Atlantic Ocean. Her crew were rescued by Union (United Kingdom).

== 17 October ==
List of shipwrecks: 17 October 1839
Ship	State	Description
Druid	United Kingdom	The ship was driven ashore at Barry's Head, County Cork.

== 18 October ==
List of shipwrecks: 18 October 1839
Ship	State	Description
Antelope	United Kingdom	The ship was driven ashore at Macedon Point. She was on a voyage from Belfast, County Antrim to Glasgow, Renfrewshire.
Betsey	United Kingdom	The ship was severely damaged by fire at South Shields, County Durham.
Marie Thérèse	France	The ship was wrecked on the Woolpack Sand, in The Wash. Her crew were rescued. She was on a voyage from Sunderland, County Durham, United Kingdom to Rouen, Seine-Inférieure.
Narcissa	United Kingdom	The ship was driven ashore and wrecked at Manila, Spanish East Indies.
Tickler	United Kingdom	The brig was driven ashore and wrecked at Manila. Her crew were rescued. She was on a voyage from Sydney, New South Wales to Manila.

== 19 October ==
List of shipwrecks: 19 October 1839
Ship	State	Description
Anine Nelsine	Denmark	The ship was driven ashore on the south coast of Læsø. She was on a voyage from Kalundborg to London, United Kingdom. She was later refloated.
Dreux Brėzé	France	The ship departed from Calcutta, India for Île Bourbon. No further trace, presumed foundered in the Indian Ocean with the loss of all hands.

== 20 October ==
List of shipwrecks: 20 October 1839
Ship	State	Description
Ada	United States	The ship was driven ashore and wrecked on the American coast. Her crew were rescued. She was on a voyage from Trinidad to Philadelphia, Pennsylvania.
Belfast	United Kingdom	The ship was driven ashore at Helsingør, Denmark. She was on a voyage from Danzig to Belfast, County Antrim. She was refloated the next day and resumed her voyage.
Frithioff	United Kingdom	The ship was driven ashore at Charlestown, Cornwall and was damaged. She was on a voyage from Longsound to Charlestown. Frithioff was refloated and taken into Charlestown.
Glen	United Kingdom	The ship struck a sunken rock in the Sound of Trinara and was damaged. She was on a voyage from Greenock, Renfrewshire to Sydney, New South Wales. Glen was refloated and put into Oban, Argyllshire before returning to Greenock for repairs.

== 21 October ==
List of shipwrecks: 21 October 1839
Ship	State	Description
Laurine Mathilde	Denmark	The ship departed from Gravesend, Kent for Helsingør. No further trace, presumed foundered with the loss of all hands.

== 22 October ==
List of shipwrecks: 22 October 1839
Ship	State	Description
Williamina	United Kingdom	The brig ran onto rocks on the north-east coast of Bermuda while on a voyage from Barbados to Liverpool, Lancashire, with sugar. Williamina was refloated on 24 October and put into St. George's, Bermuda, where she was condemned.

== 23 October ==
List of shipwrecks: 23 October 1839
Ship	State	Description
Brothericks	United Kingdom	The brig ran aground on the Nore. She was refloated the next day and proceeded on her voyage to Newcastle upon Tyne, Northumberland.
Esther	United Kingdom	The ship was driven ashore on Saltholm, Denmark. She was on a voyage from Saint Petersburg, Russia to London. Esther was later refloated and resumed her voyage.
Hercules	United Kingdom	The schooner was driven ashore at Blyth, Northumberland. She was on a voyage from Danzig to London. Hercules was refloated on 26 October and taken into Blyth.
Prince Leopold	United Kingdom	The ship was driven ashore on Lindisfarne, Northumberland. Her crew were rescued. She was on a voyage from Cardiff, Glamorgan to Goole, Yorkshire. Prince Leopold was refloated on 26 October and taken into harbour.

== 24 October ==
List of shipwrecks: 24 October 1839
Ship	State	Description
Eliza	United Kingdom	The ship was wrecked on the Sardanilloes. Her crew were rescued. She was on a voyage from Jamaica to Cuba and Leith, Lothian.
Persian	United Kingdom	The ship foundered off the south west of Inagua. Her crew were rescued. She was on a voyage from St. Jago de Cuba, Cuba to Swansea, Glamorgan.
Struggler	United Kingdom	The ship ran aground at South Shields, County Durham. She was on a voyage from South Shields to Aberdeen. Struggler was refloated and resumed her voyage.

== 25 October ==
List of shipwrecks: 25 October 1839
Ship	State	Description
Gratitude	United Kingdom	The ship was driven ashore on the coast of Denmark. She was on a voyage from London to Riga, Russia. Gratitude was refloated on 27 October and resumed her voyage.
Rowena	United Kingdom	The ship was driven ashore at "Kildony". She was on a voyage from Bangor to Ballyshannon, County Donegal. Rowena was refloated on 29 October and taken into Ballyshannon.'
William	United Kingdom	The ship ran aground at Plymouth, Devon and was damaged. She was on a voyage from Plymouth to Aberdeen. William was refloated.

== 26 October ==
List of shipwrecks: 26 October 1839
Ship	State	Description
Cleveland	United Kingdom	The ship was wrecked on Scroby Sands, Norfolk. Her crew were rescued.
Matilda	United Kingdom	The ship ran aground and was damaged in the River Tees. She was on a voyage from Middlesbrough, Yorkshire to London. Matilda was refloated and put into Hartlepool, County Durham.

== 27 October ==
List of shipwrecks: 27 October 1839
Ship	State	Description
Britannia	United Kingdom	The ship ran aground off Arkhangelsk, Russia. Her crew were rescued and she was set afire. She was on a voyage from Arkhangelsk to Hull, Yorkshire.
Derwent	United Kingdom	The ship ran aground on the Lappesand, in the Baltic Sea off the coast of Denmark. She was on a voyage from Saint Petersburg, Russia to London. Derwent was refloated with assistance from the steamship Prindsesse Wilhelmina (Denmark). She resumed her voyage on 29 October.

== 28 October ==
List of shipwrecks: 28 October 1839
Ship	State	Description
Albert	United Kingdom	The ship capsized and sank in the Irish Sea off Holyhead, Anglesey. Her crew were rescued. She was on a voyage from Liverpool, Lancashire to Nantes, Loire Atlantique, France.
Ann	United Kingdom	The ship struck the Newland Rock, off Padstow, Cornwall and sank. Her crew were rescued. She was on a voyage from Padstow to Porthcawl, Glamorgan.
George	United Kingdom	The ship was driven ashore at Shoreham-by-Sea, Sussex. She was on a voyage from Stockton-on-Tees, County Durham to Stockton-on-Tees.
Isis	United Kingdom	The ship was wrecked on the Platters, in the North Sea off the coast of Essex. Her crew were rescued. She was on a voyage from Newcastle upon Tyne, Northumberland to Vlissingen, Zeeland, Netherlands.
Margaret and Graham	United Kingdom	The ship was driven ashore and severely damaged at Margate, Kent. She was on a voyage from Sunderland, County Durham to Margate. Margaret and Graham was refloated.
Medway	United Kingdom	The ship was driven ashore and wrecked at Harwich, Essex. Her crew were rescued. She was on a voyage from South Shields, County Durham to Maldon, Essex.
Sophia	United Kingdom	The ship was driven ashore and wrecked at Cley-next-the-Sea, Norfolk. she was on a voyage from Goole, Yorkshire to Great Yarmouth, Norfolk.

== 29 October ==
List of shipwrecks: 29 October 1839
Ship	State	Description
Anna Maria	United Kingdom	The ship ran aground on the Blowers Rocks, off Gola Island, County Donegal and was damaged. She was on a voyage from Glasgow, Renfrewshire to Limerick. Anna Maria was refloated and put into Rutland, County Donegal.
Achilles	United Kingdom	The ship's crew abandoned her in the North Sea off Cromer, Norfolk and she subsequently foundered. She was on a voyage from South Shields, County Durham to London.
Caroline	Netherlands	The ship was driven ashore near Den Helder, North Holland. She was on a voyage from Dram, Norway to Amsterdam, North Holland.
Clyde	United Kingdom	The ship was driven ashore at Great Yarmouth, Norfolk. She was refloated on 5 November and taken into Great Yarmouth.
Concordia	Netherlands	The ship was driven ashore on Texel, North Holland, where she was subsequently wrecked with the loss of her captain. She was on a voyage from Königsberg to Amsterdam, North Holland.
Fair Hope	United Kingdom	The ship struck rocks off Porthcawl, Glamorgan and was damaged. She was on a voyage from Douglas, Isle of Man to Bristol, Gloucestershire. Fair Hope was refloated and resumed her voyage.
Frank	United Kingdom	The ship was driven ashore at Great Yarmouth. She was refloated on 5 November and taken into Great Yarmouth.
Hope	United Kingdom	The ship was driven ashore at Great Yarmouth. She was refloated on 5 November and taken into Great Yarmouth.
Twende Brodre	Netherlands	The ship sprang a leak and sank in the Zuyder Zee. She was on a voyage from Skien, Norway to Amsterdam, North Holland.
William and Jane	United Kingdom	The ship was driven ashore and wrecked at Great Yarmouth.

== 30 October ==
List of shipwrecks: 30 October 1839
Ship	State	Description
Aide	United Kingdom	The ship was driven ashore and wrecked at Corton, Suffolk.
Coadjutor	United Kingdom	The ship ran aground on the Falsterbo Reef. She was on a voyage from Saint Petersburg, Russia to Hull, Yorkshire. Coadjutor was refloated and taken into Helsingør, Denmark.
Endeavour	United Kingdom	The sloop was lost on the Ridge Sand, in the North Sea off the coast of Essex. She was on a voyage from Norwich, Norfolk to London.
Eugene	United Kingdom	The ship was driven ashore at Calais, France. She was on a voyage from Antwerp, Belgium to Hull.
Friends	United Kingdom	The ship was driven ashore at Freiston, Lincolnshire. She was on a voyage from Boston, Lincolnshire to Rouen, Seine-Inférieure, France.
James	United Kingdom	The ship ran aground on the Jenkin Sand, in the Thames Estuary. She was refloated and resumed her voyage.
Jane	United Kingdom	The ship was driven ashore at Dundalk, County Louth. She was refloated on 7 November.
Margaret	United Kingdom	The ship ran aground on the Hoyle Bank, in Liverpool Bay. She was on a voyage from Saint Petersburg, Russia to Liverpool, Lancashire. Margaret was refloated with assistance from the steamship Ormerod (United Kingdom) and beached.
Rebecca Frances	United Kingdom	The ship was wrecked on a reef off Cap-Haïtien, Haiti.
Town of Ross	United Kingdom	The ship was driven ashore and wrecked at Wicklow. She was on a voyage from Quebec City, Lower Canada, British North America to Wicklow.
William and Jane	United Kingdom	The ship was driven ashore and wrecked at Great Yarmouth, Norfolk. Her six crew were rescued by Dennett's Apparatus.

== 31 October ==
List of shipwrecks: 31 October 1839
Ship	State	Description
Dairymaid	United Kingdom	The ship ran aground and sank in the River Dee.
Eleanor	United Kingdom	The ship was driven ashore in Sheetland Bay, Dorset.
Mars	United Kingdom	The brig ran aground on the Hoo Flat, Kent. She was on a voyage from London to Sunderland, County Durham. Mars was refloated two days later.
St. Pierre	France	The ship was in collision with John and Sally (United Kingdom) and foundered in Mounts Bay. Her crew were rescued by John and Sally. St. Pierre was on a voyage from Noirmoutier, Vendée to Burry Port, Glamorgan, United Kingdom.
Tennant	United Kingdom	The ship ran aground on the Nore. She was on a voyage from Hamburg to London. Tennant was refloated and resumed her voyage.
Three Brothers	United Kingdom	The ship was driven ashore in Sheetland Bay.

== Unknown date ==
List of shipwrecks: Unknown date in October 1839
Ship	State	Description
Adrian et Marin	France	The ship was driven ashore at Cherbourg, Seine-Inférieure. She was on a voyage from Sunderland, County Durham, United Kingdom to Cette, Hérault. She was later refloated and taken into Cherbourg for repairs.
Ant	(United Kingdom of Great Britain and Ireland) Saint Kitts	The sloop was wrecked on Palmetto Point before 1 November.
Belle Poule	French Navy	The ship ran aground on the Taches Blanches, in the Dardanelles and was damaged. She was later refloated and taken into Constantinople, Ottoman Empire for temporary repairs. She subsequently sailed to Toulon, Var for permanent repairs.
Brilliant	United States	The brig was wrecked in the Bay of Plenty, New Zealand.
Dolphin	United Kingdom	The ship was wrecked at Guernsey, Channel Islands before 31 October.
Echo	Hamburg	The ship was driven ashore on Hogland, Russia. She was on a voyage from Matanzas, Cuba to Saint Petersburg, Russia. Echo was later refloated and taken into "Frederickshamn".
Eliza	United Kingdom	The ship was wrecked on the Sardinallaoes before 24 October. Her crew were rescued. She was on a voyage from Jamaica to Cuba and Leith, Lothian.
Eliza	(United Kingdom of Great Britain and Ireland) Saint Kitts	The sloop was wrecked on Palmetto Point before 1 November.
Fortuna	Denmark	The ship was driven ashore near "Langshore". She was on a voyage from "Kullendborg" to Samsø.
Frederick	United States	The ship was driven ashore on Rödskär, Sweden. She was on a voyage from Saint Petersburg to New York. Frederick was refloated and taken into Frederikshavn, Denmark.
Henry Freeling	(United Kingdom of Great Britain and Ireland) New South Wales	The schooner was stranded and wrecked at Tautuku, New Zealand sometime early in October. She was carrying goods from Sydney to Otago. The crew all survived.
Hercules	United Kingdom	The ship was driven ashore at Blyth, Northumberland. She was on a voyage from Danzig to London. Hercules was refloated on 26 October and taken into Blyth.
Hope	United Kingdom	The ship was wrecked on the coast of Newfoundland, British North America with the loss of a crew member. She was on a voyage from Cork to Gaspé, Lower Canada, British North America.
Idogheten	(United States) Florida Territory	The ship was driven ashore on Faraman Point. She was on a voyage from Pensacola to Marseille, Bouches-du-Rhône, France.
Lady Anne	United Kingdom	The ship was wrecked on the south west point of Anticosti Island, Lower Canada, British North America before 21 October.
Magnus	United Kingdom	The ship foundered in the English Channel on or before 14 October.
Nancy	(United Kingdom of Great Britain and Ireland) British North America	The schooner was wrecked on the east coast of Anticosti Island before 19 October with the loss of a crew member.
Nautilus	(United Kingdom of Great Britain and Ireland) Jersey	The smack was wrecked near Burgeo, Newfoundland, British North America.
Nancy	United Kingdom	The ship ran aground on the Owers Sandbank, in the English Channel off the coast of Sussex. She was refloated on 28 October and taken into Portsmouth, Hampshire for repairs.
Newton	United Kingdom	The ship was wrecked near Cape Chat, Lower Canada. She was on a voyage from Quebec City to Sunderland.
