= List of shipwrecks in 1830 =

The list of shipwrecks in 1830 includes ships sunk, foundered, grounded, or otherwise lost during 1830.

table of contents
1830
Jan	Feb	Mar	Apr
May	Jun	Jul	Aug
Sep	Oct	Nov	Dec
Unknown date

== Unknown date ==
List of shipwrecks: Unknown date in 1830
Ship	State	Description
Achilles	United Kingdom	The whaler was lost in the Davis Strait.
Aetna	Unknown	The schooner was lost in the vicinity of "Squan Beach," a term used at the time for the coast of New Jersey near Manasquan and sometimes for the 7-mile (11 km) stretch of coast between Manasquan Inlet and Cranberry Inlet or for the entire coast of New Jersey between Sea Girt and Barnegat Inlet.
Amazon	United States	The fishing schooner was lost in the Bay of Chaleur. Crew saved.
Boutecours	France	The ship was driven ashore in a hurricane at Île Bourbon between 27 March and 4 April.
Concord	United Kingdom	The ship was struck by a whale in the Atlantic Ocean and foundered. Her crew were rescued by Romanoff (United Kingdom).
Concordia	Portugal	The ship was lost at Iguape, Brazil. She was on a voyage from Porto to Rio Grande do Sul, Brazil.
Duguelessilia	France	The ship foundered in a hurricane off Île Bourbon between 27 March and 4 April.
Etna	Unknown	The schooner was lost in the vicinity of "Squan Beach," a term used at the time for the coast of New Jersey near Manasquan and sometimes for the 7-mile (11 km) stretch of coast between Manasquan Inlet and Cranberry Inlet or for the entire coast of New Jersey between Sea Girt and Barnegat Inlet.
Eclair	France	The ship was wrecked near Pointe-à-Pitre, Guadeloupe.
Eloise	France	The ship foundered in a hurricane at Île Bourbon between 27 March and 4 April.
Entreprenant	France	The ship foundered in a hurricane off Île Bourbon between 27 March and 4 April.
Ephemia	(United Kingdom of Great Britain and Ireland) New South Wales	The ship was wrecked whilst on a voyage from the Swan River Colony to Timor All on board survived.
Esperance	France	The ship was lost off Saint-François, Guadeloupe.
George	United Kingdom	The whaler was wrecked on Lord Howe Island. There were at least five survivors.
Gilder	United Kingdom	The whaler was lost in the Davis Strait.
Golden Fleece	United Kingdom	The ship was lost in Bahia Bay during a hurricane.
Harriet	(United Kingdom of Great Britain and Ireland) New South Wales	The whaler was sighted off the coast of Japan during the 1830 whaling season. No further trace, presumed foundered with the loss of all hands.
Haweis	(United Kingdom of Great Britain and Ireland) New South Wales	The brig foundered in the Pacific Ocean with the loss of all on board.
Helen	United Kingdom	The sloop was wrecked at Jamaica.
Janet	United Kingdom	The ship foundered with the loss of all hands. She was on a voyage from Quebec City, Lower Canada, British North America to Limerick.
Laurel	United Kingdom	The whaler was lost in the Davis Strait.
Louise	France	The ship was driven ashore in a hurricane at Île Bourbon between 27 March and 4 April.
Maria Thérèse	France	The ship was driven ashore in a hurricane at Île Bourbon between 27 March and 4 April.
Munster Lass	United Kingdom	The ship was lost in the Saint Lawrence River, British North America. Her crew were rescued.
North Briton	United Kingdom	The whaler was lost in the Davis Strait.
Onze de Maio	Portugal	The ship was wrecked at Rio de Janeiro, Brazil.
Oxenhope	United Kingdom	The whaler was lost in the Davis Strait.
Progress	United Kingdom	The whaler was lost in the Davis Strait.
Rising Star	Argentina	The paddle steamer foundered in the Irish Sea.
Romilly	France	The ship was driven ashore in a hurricane at Île Bourbon between 27 March and 4 April.
Sappho	United Kingdom	The ship was wrecked off the coast of Florida, United States before 26 April.
Sophia	France	The full-rigged ship foundered in a hurricane off Île Bourbon between 27 March and 4 April.
Sovereign	Unknown	The full-rigged ship was lost in the vicinity of "Squan Beach," a term used at the time for the coast of New Jersey near Manasquan and sometimes for the 7-mile (11 km) stretch of coast between Manasquan Inlet and Cranberry Inlet or for the entire coast of New Jersey between Sea Girt and Barnegat Inlet.
Spencer	United Kingdom	The whaler was lost in the Davis Strait.
Thankful Winslow	Unknown	The schooner was lost in the vicinity of "Squan Beach," a term used at the time for the coast of New Jersey near Manasquan and sometimes for the 7-mile (11 km) stretch of coast between Manasquan Inlet and Cranberry Inlet or for the entire coast of New Jersey between Sea Girt and Barnegat Inlet.
Three Brothers	United Kingdom	The whaler was lost in the Davis Strait.
Union	United States	The ship was wrecked off the coast of Florida before 26 April.
Victor	France	The ship foundered in a hurricane off Île Bourbon between 27 March and 4 April.
William & Anne	United Kingdom	The whaler was lost in the Davis Strait.
Worcester	United Kingdom	The ship was wrecked on the coast of Newfoundland, British North America. She was on a voyage from Lisbon, Portugal to Newfoundland.
No. 14	Imperial Russian Navy	The ship was wrecked between ro:Gura Portiței and the Sfântu Gheorghe branch of the Danube, 30 nautical miles (56 km) from the Sulina branch. Her crew were rescued. She was on her way from Köstence, Ottoman Empire.
