= List of shipwrecks in October 1823 =

The list of shipwrecks in October 1823 includes all ships sunk, foundered, grounded, or otherwise lost during October 1823.

== 1 October ==
List of shipwrecks: 1 October 1823
| Ship | State | Description |
|---|---|---|
| Betsey | United Kingdom | The ship foundered in the North Sea 30 nautical miles (56 km) east of the Galloper Sandbank. Her crew were rescued |
| Caroline | Hamburg | The ship was wrecked on the Goodwin Sands, Kent. United Kingdom. She was on a voyage from Rio de Janeiro, Brazil to Hamburg. |
| Fowler | United Kingdom | The ship was driven ashore near Varberg, Sweden. She was on a voyage from Saint Petersburg, Russia to London. She was refloated on 21 October and taken in to Gothenburg, Sweden where she was deemed beyond repair. |
| Providence | United Kingdom | The ship was driven ashore and wrecked at Dymchurch, Kent. |
| Two Friends | United Kingdom | The ship sprang a leak and foundered in the North Sea off Scarborough, Yorkshire with the loss of three lives. |

== 2 October ==
List of shipwrecks: 2 October 1823
| Ship | State | Description |
|---|---|---|
| Achilles | United Kingdom | A storm caught the ship between the Spurn and the floating light. Achilles lost her foremast and bowsprit. Two smacks came out and towed her into Hull. |
| Thomas | United Kingdom | The schooner capsized and sank in a squall off Carrickfergus, County Antrim with the loss of four lives. She was on a voyage from Troon, Ayrshire to Belfast, County Antrim. |
| Triore | United Kingdom | The ship was driven on to the Dragoe Reef, in the Baltic Sea. She was later refloated. Triore was on a voyage from Memel, Prussia to Newcastle upon Tyne, Northumberland. |

== 3 October ==
List of shipwrecks: 3 October 1823
| Ship | State | Description |
|---|---|---|
| Young Fanny | United Kingdom | The ship ran aground at Woodspring, Somerset and was wrecked. She was on a voyage from Amsterdam, North Holland, Netherlands to Bristol, Gloucestershire. |

== 4 October ==
List of shipwrecks: 4 October 1823
| Ship | State | Description |
|---|---|---|
| Fortune | France | The ship was abandoned whilst on a voyage from Bordeaux, Gironde to Rouen, Seine-Inférieure. |

== 5 October ==
List of shipwrecks: 5 October 1823
| Ship | State | Description |
|---|---|---|
| Atis (Атис, 'Atys') | Imperial Russian Navy | The cutter was driven ashore and wrecked on the island of Notholmen (Note: Later connected to mainland by landfill, becoming part of the Western Harbour of the Port of Hanko.) at Hanko, Grand Duchy of Finland. Her crew survived. She floated off on 8 October and sank. |
| Bato | Netherlands | The ship was abandoned in the North Sea off Buchan Ness, Aberdeenshire, United Kingdom. Her crew were rescued by Unity (United Kingdom). Bato was on a voyage from Dunbar, Lothian, United Kingdom to Groningen. |
| Betsey | United Kingdom | The brig foundered in the English Channel off Dover, Kent. Her crew were rescued by a Dutch vessel. |
| Consul | United Kingdom | The ship was wrecked on the Barnard Sand, in the North Sea off the coast of Suffolk. Her crew were rescued. She was on a voyage from Sunderland, County Durham to London. |
| Fisher | United Kingdom | The ship was in collision with a Dutch fishing vessel in the North Sea and was abandoned. Her crew were rescued by Unity (United Kingdom). Fisher was on a voyage from Scalloway, Shetland Islands to Leith, Lothian. |

== 7 October ==
List of shipwrecks: 7 October 1823
| Ship | State | Description |
|---|---|---|
| Anne Dorothea | Denmark | The ship was driven ashore at Point India, Argentina. She was on a voyage from Copenhagen to Buenos Aires, Argentina. |
| Augustus | Bremen | The ship was wrecked near the Cordouan Lighthouse, Gironde, France. She was on a voyage from Bremen to Bordeaux, Gironde. |
| Peter Francisco | United States | The ship was wrecked on Bodie Island, North Carolina. All on board were rescued. She was on a voyage from New York to Mobile, Alabama. |

== 8 October ==
List of shipwrecks: 8 October 1823
| Ship | State | Description |
|---|---|---|
| Bell | United Kingdom | The sloop was driven ashore at Campbeltown, Argyllshire. She was on a voyage from Workington, Cumberland to Lough Swilly. |
| Père de Familie | United Kingdom | The ship was wrecked at Roscoff, Finistère. she was on a voyage from Newfoundland to Granville, Manche. |

== 9 October ==
List of shipwrecks: 9 October 1823
| Ship | State | Description |
|---|---|---|
| Anacreon | United Kingdom | The ship was lost in the Magdalen Islands, Lower Canada, British North America. Her crew were rescued. She was on a voyage from Liverpool, Lancashire to Miramichi, New Brunswick, British North America. |
| Brilliant | United Kingdom | The ship was driven ashore on the Warden Ledge, Isle of Wight. She was on a voyage from Guernsey, Channel Islands to Southampton, Hampshire. Brilliant was refloated on 24 October and taken in to Southampton. |
| Sarah | United Kingdom | The ship struck The Manacles and sank. Her crew survived. She was on a voyage from London to Dublin. |

== 10 October ==
List of shipwrecks: 10 October 1823
| Ship | State | Description |
|---|---|---|
| Ann McKenzie | United Kingdom | The ship struck the Bondicar Rocks, off the coast of Lothian and was wrecked. She was on a voyage from Málaga, Spain to Leith, Lothian. |
| Arab | United Kingdom | The ship was driven ashore and damaged at Portsmouth, Hampshire. She was refloated the next day. |
| St. Pierre | France | The ship was wrecked a league (3 nautical miles (5.6 km)) from La Rochelle. Charente-Maritime. She was on a voyage from Bordeaux, Gironde to Havre de Grâce, Seine-Inférieure. |

== 11 October ==
List of shipwrecks: 11 October 1823
| Ship | State | Description |
|---|---|---|
| Amphion | Sweden | The ship was driven ashore and wrecked near Dymchurch, Kent, United Kingdom. She was on a voyage from Stockholm to Havre de Grâce, Seine-Inférieure France. |
| Ariadne | Danzig | The ship was driven ashore at Helsingør, Denmark. |
| Atalanta | United Kingdom | The ship was wrecked on Cape Ballard Head, Newfoundland, British North America with the loss of a crew member. She was on a voyage from Liverpool, Lancashire to St. John's, Newfoundland. |
| Clementina | United Kingdom | The ship was driven ashore at Stromness, Orkney Islands. She was on a voyage from Christiansand, Norway to Londonderry. |
| Emery | United Kingdom | The ship was driven ashore and sank at Scarborough, North Riding of Yorkshire. Her crew were rescued by the Scarborough Lifeboat. Emery was on a voyage from South Shields, County Durham to London. She was refloated on 17 October. |
| Good Intent | United Kingdom | The ship was driven ashore and severely damaged at Leith, Lothian. She was on a voyage from Newry, County Antrim to Leith. Good Intent was later refloated and taken in to Leith. |
| New Rose in June | United Kingdom | The ship foundered in the North Sea off Scarborough. She was on a voyage from Sunderland, County Durham to Portugal. |
| Nottingham | United Kingdom | The ship was driven ashore in Romney Bay, Kent. She was on a voyage from Sunderland, County Durham to Plymouth, Devon. Nottingham was refloated in mid-November and take in to Ramsgate, Kent, where she arrived on the 18th. |
| Prompt | United Kingdom | The ship struck the pier and sank at Scarborough. Prompt was refloated on 17 October. |
| Sisters | United Kingdom | The ship foundered in the Humber with the loss of all but one of her crew. |
| St. Paul | Netherlands | The ship sank at South End, Yorkshire. She was on a voyage from Hull, Yorkshire to Antwerp. |
| Vrow Anna | Netherlands | The galiot was driven ashore and wrecked at Kirkcaldy, Fife, United Kingdom. She was on a voyage from Antwerp to Kirkcaldy. |
| William | United Kingdom | The ship was wrecked on the Gunfleet Sand, in the North Sea off the coast of Essex. Her crew survived. |

== 12 October ==
List of shipwrecks: 12 October 1823
| Ship | State | Description |
|---|---|---|
| Ellen Charine | Norway | The ship was driven ashore and wrecked near Lerwick, Shetland Islands, United Kingdom. She was on a voyage from Dram to A Scottish port. |
| Hebe | United Kingdom | The ship was driven ashore at Dungeness, Kent. She was on a voyage from Saint Petersburg, Russia to Whitehaven, Cumberland. Hebe was refloated on 15 October and taken in to Dover. |
| Industrious | United Kingdom | The ship was driven ashore and wrecked on the Hook Sand, in The Solent. She was on a voyage from Southampton, Hampshire to Poole, Dorset. |

== 15 October ==
List of shipwrecks: 15 October 1823
| Ship | State | Description |
|---|---|---|
| Britannia | United Kingdom | The ship was wrecked near Balbriggan, County Dublin. Her crew were rescued by the Balbriggan Lifeboat. |
| Friends | United Kingdom | The ship was driven ashore near "Bellcarrie", Cumberland. |
| John and Joseph | United Kingdom | The ship was wrecked in St. George's Bay. |

== 16 October ==
List of shipwrecks: 16 October 1823
| Ship | State | Description |
|---|---|---|
| Auguste | France | The ship was wrecked at Bayonne, Basses-Pyrénées. |
| Courier | France | The ship was wrecked in Chale Bay with the loss of three of her crew. She was on a voyage from Le Croisic., Loire-Inférieure to Rouen, Seine-Inférieure |
| Philorth | United Kingdom | The ship was driven ashore and wrecked at Aberdeen. |
| Queen Charlotte | United Kingdom | The sloop was wrecked near Formby, Lancashire. Her crew survived |

== 18 October ==
List of shipwrecks: 18 October 1823
| Ship | State | Description |
|---|---|---|
| Ellen Katrine | flag unknown | The ship foundered in the North Sea with the loss of a crew member. |

== 19 October ==
List of shipwrecks: 19 October 1823
| Ship | State | Description |
|---|---|---|
| Clio | United Kingdom | The ship struck rocks off Guernsey, Channel Islands and sank. She was on a voyage from Rio de Janeiro, Brazil to Livorno, Grand Duchy of Tuscany via Guernsey and Genoa, Kingdom of Sardinia. |

== 20 October ==
List of shipwrecks: 20 October 1823
| Ship | State | Description |
|---|---|---|
| Fanny | United Kingdom | The brig ran aground on the Corton Sand, in the North Sea off Lowestoft, Suffolk and was wrecked. Her crew were rescued. She was on a voyage from Sunderland, County Durham to London. |
| Lady Hughes | United Kingdom | The ship was run down and sunk at Holyhead, Anglesey by Grace (United Kingdom). Her crew were rescued. |
| Wilderspool | United Kingdom | The ship foundered in Cemaes Bay, Anglesey with the loss of all hands. She was on a voyage from Newry, County Antrim to Bangor, Caernarfonshire. |

== 21 October ==
List of shipwrecks: 21 October 1823
| Ship | State | Description |
|---|---|---|
| Corsair | United Kingdom | The smack was wrecked on the Buxey Sand, in the North Sea off the coast of Essex. Her crew were rescued. |

== 22 October ==
List of shipwrecks: 22 October 1823
| Ship | State | Description |
|---|---|---|
| Caledonia | United Kingdom | The ship was wrecked off Orford, Suffolk. Her crew were rescued. |

== 23 October ==
List of shipwrecks: 23 October 1823
| Ship | State | Description |
|---|---|---|
| La Maria | France | The schooner was wrecked off St. Ives, Cornwall, United Kingdom with the loss of two of her seven crew. She was on a voyage from Neath, Glamorgan, United Kingdom to Nantes, Loire-Inférieure. |
| Villager | United Kingdom | The ship was driven ashore and wrecked south of Lowestoft, Suffolk with the loss of all on board. |

== 24 October ==
List of shipwrecks: 24 October 1823
| Ship | State | Description |
|---|---|---|
| Manchester | United Kingdom | The ship departed from Porto, Portugal for Hoylake, Lancashire. No further trace, presumed foundered with the loss of all hands. |
| Sophia | Netherlands | The ship foundered off Domesnes, Norway. Her crew were rescued. |
| Yekaterina (Екатерина) | Imperial Russian Navy | The transport ship was beached at the mouth of the ru:Oblukovina, Kamchatka. Her crew survived. She was on a voyage from Okhotsk to Tigil. Yekaterina was refloated the next year. |

== 25 October ==
List of shipwrecks: 25 October 1823
| Ship | State | Description |
|---|---|---|
| Ardent | United States | The whaler was wrecked at sea with the loss of ten of her fourteen crew. The survivors were rescued by Lord Sidmouth United Kingdom). |
| Eliza Burges | United States | The ship was wrecked on "Wardel's Beach". She was on a voyage from Saint Croix to New York. |
| Grasshopper | (United Kingdom of Great Britain and Ireland) British North America | The brig was wrecked at the mouth of the North River. All on board were rescued. She was on a voyage from Jamaica to Quebec City, Lower Canada. |
| Johannes | Sweden | The ship was driven ashore and wrecked near Strömstad. Her crew were rescued. |
| Toliapis | United Kingdom | The ship departed from Liverpool, Lancashire for Terceira, Azores, Portugal. No further trace, presumed foundered with the loss of all hands. |

== 26 October ==
List of shipwrecks: 26 October 1823
| Ship | State | Description |
|---|---|---|
| St. John's | (United Kingdom of Great Britain and Ireland) British North America | The ship ran aground near Cape Ballard, Newfoundland with the loss of a crew member. she was on a voyage from St. John's, Newfoundland to Halifax, Nova Scotia. |

== 27 October ==
List of shipwrecks: 27 October 1823
| Ship | State | Description |
|---|---|---|
| Frankling | United Kingdom | The ship was lost near "Jasmond". She was on a voyage from Rouen, Seine-Inférieure, France to a Baltic port. |

== 29 October ==
List of shipwrecks: 29 October 1823
| Ship | State | Description |
|---|---|---|
| Charlotte | United Kingdom | The ship departed from Southampton, Hampshire for Jersey, Channel Islands. No further trace, Presumed foundered with the loss of all hands. |
| Curlew | (United Kingdom of Great Britain and Ireland) British North America | The coaster, a schooner, was wrecked in Placentia Bay. |
| Louise | Stettin | The ship was wrecked on Læsø, Denmark. Her crew were rescued. She was on a voyage from Leith, Lothian, United Kingdom to Stettin. |
| Roscian | United Kingdom | The sloop sprang a leak in the Irish Sea off Bardsey Island, Pembrokeshire and was beached at Pwllheli, Caernarfonshire. |

== 30 October ==
List of shipwrecks: 30 October 1823
| Ship | State | Description |
|---|---|---|
| Betsey | United Kingdom | The brig foundered in the Atlantic Ocean off St. Ives, Cornwall with the loss of all hands. |
| Ceres von Lübeck | Lübeck | The ship foundered in the Kattegat. |
| Eleanor | United Kingdom | The ship was lost near Fishguard, Pembrokeshire. Her crew were rescued. |
| Forester | United Kingdom | The sloop was run down and sunk in the Bristol Channel by Portland (United Kingdom) with the loss of a crew member. She was on a voyage from Newport, Monmouthshire to Bristol, Gloucestershire. |
| Fortitude | United Kingdom | The ship departed from Limerick for London. No further trace, presumed foundered with the loss of all hands. |
| Friends | United Kingdom | The ship was driven ashore and wrecked at Dublin. |
| Friend's Increase | United Kingdom | The ship was wrecked on the How Rock with the loss of four of her crew. |
| Good Intent | United Kingdom | The ship was driven ashore and damaged at St Helen's, Isles of Scilly. She was on a voyage from Newport, Monmouthshire to Waterford. Good Intent was taken in to St Mary's, Isles of Scilly in early December. |
| Hero | United Kingdom | The brig foundered in Swansea Bay. Her crew were rescued. She was refloated a few days later. |
| Isla | United Kingdom | The ship foundered with the loss of all hands. She was on a voyage from Liverpool, Lancashire to Exmouth, Devon. |
| Maria | Prussia | The ship was beached at Pillau. Her crew were rescued. She was on a voyage from Liverpool to Pillau. Maria was refloated the next day. |
| Massachusetts | United States | The ship was driven ashore at Cape Cod, Massachusetts. She was on a voyage from Bremen to Boston, Massachusetts. |
| Morrison | United Kingdom | The brig foundered in the Bristol Channel off Lundy Island, Devon with the loss of all but three of the 27 people on board. She was on a voyage from Cork to Newport. |
| Nancy | United Kingdom | The ship was lost near Fishguard with the loss of all hands. |
| Regent | United Kingdom | The ship was driven ashore and wrecked at Varberg, Sweden. Her crew were rescued. She was on a voyage from Riga, Russia to Grimsby, Lincolnshire. |
| Two Friends | United Kingdom | The ship was driven ashore and severely damaged at Plymouth, Devon. She was on a voyage from Gibraltar to Plymouth. Two Friends was later refloated and taken in to the Cattewater. |
| Virgin del Carmen | Spain | The ship was wrecked in the Bay of Cádiz. She was on a voyage from Almería to Lisbon, Portugal. |

== 31 October ==
List of shipwrecks: 31 October 1823
| Ship | State | Description |
|---|---|---|
| Active | United Kingdom | The collier was driven ashore at Salthouse, Norfolk. Her crew were rescued. She was refloated in late November. |
| Adamant | United Kingdom | The ship was driven ashore south of Cleethorpes, Lincolnshire. She was on a voyage from London to South Shields, County Durham. |
| Adeona | United Kingdom | The ship was driven ashore near Wolferton, Norfolk. |
| Agenoria | United Kingdom | The ship ran aground and sank in The Wash off King's Lynn, Norfolk with the loss of five of her crew, She was on a voyage from Sunderland, County Durham to Topsham, Devon. |
| Albion | United Kingdom | The ship was driven ashore between Burnham Overy Staithe and Cley-next-the-Sea. Her crew were rescued. She was refloated in late November. |
| Alfred | United Kingdom | The brig was driven ashore and wrecked at Pedudver Point, Cornwall with the loss of a crew member. |
| Alice | United Kingdom | The ship foundered 5 nautical miles (9.3 km) east of Ilfracombe, Devon. with the loss of all hands She was on a voyage from Cork to Newport, Monmouthshire. |
| Ange Maria | France | The ship was wrecked at Auray, Morbihan. |
| Ann | United Kingdom | The ship was driven ashore and wrecked at Portishead, Somerset. |
| Ann | United Kingdom | The ship was driven ashore south of Cleethorpes. |
| Ann | United Kingdom | The ship was driven ashore and wrecked at Salthouse, Norfolk with the loss of three of her crew. She was on a voyage from Saint Petersburg, Russia to London. |
| Ann | United Kingdom | The ship was wrecked on the Mouse Sand, in the North Sea off Brightlingsea, Essex with the loss of all hands. |
| Ann | United Kingdom | The ship was wrecked at Salthouse. She was on a voyage from Saint Petersburg, Russia to London. |
| Anna Dorothea | Norway | The brig was wrecked near Cherbourg, Seine-Inférieure, France. She was on a voyage from St. Ubes, Portugal to Sweden. |
| Anna Maria | Denmark | The ship was wrecked near Cherbourg. She was on a voyage from St. Ubes to Denmark. |
| Ann & Jane | United Kingdom | The sloop was driven ashore near Clovelly, Devon. Her crew were rescued. She was on a voyage from Youghal, County Cork to Cardiff, Glamorgan |
| Arctic | United Kingdom | The ship was driven ashore at Cley-next-the-Sea. |
| Barbara | United Kingdom | The ship was driven ashore at Cley-next-the-Sea. Her crew were rescued. |
| Barton | United Kingdom | The ship was driven ashore at Liverpool, Lancashire, She was refloated the next day. Barton was refloated the next day. |
| Beresford | United Kingdom | The ship was driven ashore between Cleethorpes and Grimsby, Lincolnshire. |
| Betsey | United Kingdom | The schooner was driven ashore at Carrack Gladden, Cornwall with the loss of two of her crew. She was on a voyage from Bristol, Gloucestershire to Plymouth, Devon She was later refloated. |
| Betsey | United Kingdom | The ship was driven ashore near Burnham Overy Staithe with the loss of all but one of her crew. |
| Betsey | United Kingdom | The ship was driven ashore near Grimsby. She was refloated by 21 November and taken in to Hull. |
| Britannia | United Kingdom | The ship was driven ashore and wrecked at Balbriggan, County Dublin, Her crew were rescued by the Balbriggan Lifeboat. |
| British Tar | United Kingdom | The brig was driven ashore south of Cleethorpes. |
| Ceres | United Kingdom | The ship was driven ashore south of Cleethorpes. |
| Chanicus | United Kingdom | The brig was driven ashore between "Patney Haven" and Grimsby. |
| Charles | France | The ship was wrecked near Bayonne, Basses-Pyrénées. She was on a voyage from Havre de Grâce, Seine-Inférieure to Bayonne. |
| Charles & Sarah | (United Kingdom of Great Britain and Ireland) British North America | The ship was driven ashore between Cleethorpes and Grimsby. She was on a voyage from Miramichi Bay to Hull. Yorkshire, United Kingdom. |
| Chasseur | France | The ship was driven ashore at Rouen, Seine-Inférieure. She was on a voyage from Bordeaux, Gironde to Rouen. |
| Clitus | United Kingdom | The schooner was driven ashore and sank on the east of Ireland's Eye, County Dublin. Her crew were rescued. |
| Commerce | United Kingdom | The ship was driven ashore and wrecked at Margate, Kent. Her crew were rescued. |
| Degoede Verwagting | Hamburg | The galiot was driven ashore between Burnham Overy Staithe and Cley-next-the-Sea. her crew were rescued, She was on a voyage from Hamburg to Porto, Portugal. Degoede Verwagting was refloated in late November. |
| Derby | United Kingdom | The brig was driven ashore and wrecked at Freiston, Lincolnshire with the loss of all hands. |
| Deux Espoirs | France | The ship was driven ashore at Rouen. She was on a voyage from Nantes, Loire-Inférieure to Abbeville, Somme. |
| Diana | United Kingdom | The ship was driven ashore between Cleethorpes and Grimsby. |
| Dispatch | United Kingdom | The schooner was driven ashore between "Patney Haven" and Grimsby. She was refloated and taken in to Grimsby for repairs by 7 November. |
| Duchess of Cumberland | United Kingdom | The brig was wrecked off Cromer, Norfolk with the loss of seven of her nine crew. |
| Duncan | United Kingdom | The galiot was wrecked at the mouth of the River Wyre with the loss of all hands. She was on a voyage from Whitehaven, Cumberland to the River Duddon. |
| Economy | United Kingdom | The ship was driven ashore at Cley-next-the-Sea. Her crew were rescued. |
| Edmund | United Kingdom | The brig was driven ashore at Winterton-on-Sea, Norfolk with the loss of five of her crew. She was on a voyage from Sunderland to London. |
| Eleanor | United Kingdom | The ship was lost at Fishguard, Pembrokeshire. Her crew were rescued. |
| Elise | France | The ship was driven ashore at Cherbourg. She was on a voyage from Newport to Rouen. |
| Elizabeth | United Kingdom | The ship was driven ashore and wrecked 4 nautical miles (7.4 km) west of St. Ives with the loss of all hands. |
| Elizabeth | United Kingdom | The ship was driven ashore at Saint-Brieuc, Côtes-du-Nord, France whilst on a voyage from London to a Brazilian port. She was refloated on 7 December and repaired. |
| Elizabeth and Sarah | United Kingdom | The ship was driven ashore between "Patney Haven" and Grimsby. She was on a voyage from Miramichi Bay to Hull. Elizabeth and Sarah was refloated by 2 December and talen in to Hull in a damaged condition. |
| Ellen | United Kingdom | The ship was driven ashore and wrecked on Walney Island, Lancashire. Her crew were rescued. She was on a voyage from Carlisle, Cumberland to Liverpool. |
| Esther | United Kingdom | The brig was wrecked at Cromer. Her twelve crew were rescued. |
| Expedition | United Kingdom | The ship was driven ashore and wrecked at Weybourne, Norfolk with the loss of a crew member. She was on a voyage from Naples, Kingdom of the Two Sicilies to Hull. |
| Fame | United Kingdom | The schooner was driven ashore and wrecked at St. Ives, Cornwall. Her crew were rescued. SHe was on a voyage from Padstow to Portreath. |
| Fame | United Kingdom | The ship was driven ashore between Cleethorpes and Grimsby. |
| Favourite | United Kingdom | The ship was driven ashore between Cleethorpes and Grimsby. |
| Fennechina | flag unknown | The ship was driven ashore at Cley-next-the-Sea. Her crew were rescued. |
| Ferguson | United Kingdom | The collier was driven ashore near Cley-next-the-Sea. |
| Ferinoo | United Kingdom | The sloop was driven ashore at Ryde, Isle of Wight. |
| Ferret | United Kingdom | The schooner was driven ashore between "Patney Haven" and Grimsby. |
| Field | United Kingdom | The sloop was driven ashore and wrecked near Mundesley. Her crew were rescued by rocket apparatus. She was on a voyage from Wick, Caithness to London. |
| Five Brothers | United Kingdom | The ship was driven ashore and wrecked near Mundesley. Her crew were rescued. She was on a voyage from "Wilderfrank" to Hull. |
| Forester | United Kingdom | The ship was run down and sunk in the Bristol Channel. She was on a voyage from Newport to Bristol. |
| Fortitude | United Kingdom | The brig was driven ashore between "Patney Haven" and Grimsby. |
| Frances | United Kingdom | The ship was driven ashore at Padstow, Cornwall. |
| Francis | United Kingdom | The ship was driven ashore 2 nautical miles (3.7 km) west of Padstow, Cornwall. She was on a voyage from Newport, historic to Wexford. Francis was refloated on 3 November and taken in to Padstow. |
| Francis | United Kingdom | The ship was driven ashore between Cleethorpes and Grimsby. She was later refloated and taken in to Hull, where she arrived on 18 November. |
| Fraser | United Kingdom | The ship was driven ashore between Cleethorpes and Grimsby. She was on a voyage from Sandwich, Kent to Blyth, Northumberland. |
| Freedom | United Kingdom | The ship was driven ashore at Scarborough, Yorkshire. Her crew were rescued by the Scarborough Lifeboat. |
| Friends | United Kingdom | The brig was driven ashore between "Patney Haven" and Grimsby. |
| | United Kingdom | The ship was driven ashore near Wells-next-the-Sea. |
| Friendship | United Kingdom | The ship was driven ashore between Cleethorpes and Grimsby. |
| Fruit Preserver | United Kingdom | The schooner was driven ashore at Lowestoft, Suffolk. Her crew were rescued. She was on a voyage from Gibraltar to Leith, Lothian. |
| Granaries | United Kingdom | The ship was driven ashore between Cley-next-the-Sea and Tetney. |
| Good Intent | United Kingdom | The brig was driven ashore between "Patney Haven" and Grimsby. She was refloated by 21 November and taken in to Hull. |
| Goodintent | United Kingdom | The ship was driven ashore near King's Lynn. |
| Goodwill | United Kingdom | The ship was driven ashore and wrecked between King's Lynn, and Terrington Marshes, Norfolk. Her crew were rescued. |
| Henry | United Kingdom | The ship was driven ashore at Cley-next-the-Sea. Her crew were rescued. |
| Hero | United Kingdom | The ship foundered in Swansea Bay. |
| Hermione | United Kingdom | The ship was driven ashore near Grimsby. She was refloated by 21 November and taken in to Hull. |
| Hoop | United Kingdom | The ship was driven ashore between Cleethorpes and Grimsby. |
| Hope | United Kingdom | The brig was driven ashore at Corton, Suffolk. Her crew were rescued. She was on a voyage from Quebec City, Lower Canada, British North America to Great Yarmouth, Norfolk. Hope was refloated and taken in to Great Yarmouth for repairs by 22 November. |
| Hope | United Kingdom | The ship was driven ashore at Sutton Wash, Lincolnshire. |
| Hope | United Kingdom | The ship was driven ashore near Brancaster, Norfolk. |
| Hope | United Kingdom | The ship was driven ashore between Cleethorpes and Grimsby. |
| Hylton | United Kingdom | The ship was driven ashore and wrecked between Burnham Overy Staithe and Cley-next-the-Sea. Her crew were rescued. She was on a voyage from Sunderland to London. |
| Iris | United Kingdom | The ship was driven ashore between Cleethorpes and Grimsby. She was on a voyage from Great Yarmouth to South Shields. |
| Isabella and Margaret | United Kingdom | The sloop was driven ashore at Corton with the loss of a crew member. |
| Jane | United Kingdom | The ship was driven ashore and wrecked between Burnham Overy Staithe and Cley-next-the-Sea. Her crew were rescued. She was on a voyage from London to Sunderland. |
| Jane | United Kingdom | The brig was driven ashore between "Patney Haven" and Grimsby. |
| Jane | United Kingdom | The sloop was driven ashore south of Cleethorpes. |
| Jane | United Kingdom | The ship was driven ashore south of Cleethorpes. |
| James | United Kingdom | The ship was driven ashore at St. Ives. |
| Jason | United Kingdom | The ship foundered in the North Sea off Wainfleet with the koss of all hands. |
| John | United Kingdom | The ship, homeport Brighton, was presumed to have foundered on this date. |
| John | United Kingdom | The ship, homeport Sunderland, foundered in the North Sea off Wainfleet. Her crew were rescued. |
| John Adams | United Kingdom | The ship was driven ashore and wrecked near St. Ives. |
| John and Mary | United Kingdom | The ship was driven ashore at Padstow, where she was scuttled. John and Mary was refloated on 3 November and taken in to Padstow. |
| John and Mary | United Kingdom | The ship was driven ashore at "Cronscholt". She was on a voyage from Saint Petersburg, Russia to London. John and Mary was refloated the next day. |
| Joseph and Ann | United Kingdom | The ship was driven ashore and sank between Cleethorpes and Grimsby. She was on a voyage from Antwerp, Netherlands to Arbroath, Forfarshire. |
| Juno | United Kingdom | The sloop was driven ashore between "Patney Haven" and Grimsby. |
| HMRC Lapwing | Board of Customs | The cutter was driven ashore near the mouth of the River Humber. |
| Liddle | United Kingdom | The ship was driven ashore at East Runton, Norfolk. |
| Manchester | United Kingdom | The ship was driven ashore between Cleethorpes and Grimsby. |
| Margaret | United Kingdom | The ship was driven ashore and wrecked near St. Ives. |
| Margaret | United Kingdom | The ship was driven ashore between Cleethorpes and Grimsby. |
| Mary | United Kingdom | The ship was driven ashore and wrecked between Burnham Overy Staithe and Cley-next-the-Sea. Her crew were rescued. she was on a voyage from Sunderland to London. |
| Mary | United States | The ship was driven ashore near Cherbourg. Her crew were rescued. She was on a voyage from Bridgeport, Connecticut, to Sunderland. Mary was refloated on 9 November and taken in to Cherbourg. |
| Mary and Ann | United Kingdom | The ship was driven ashore between Cleethorpes and Grimsby. She was refloated by 21 November and taken in to Hull. |
| Milo | United Kingdom | The ship was driven ashore at "Krasnar Gorka". She was on a voyage from London to Saint Petersburg. Salvage was later abandoned. |
| Modesty | United Kingdom | The ship was driven ashore near Wolferton. |
| Nancy | United Kingdom | The schooner was lost near Fishguard with the loss of all hands. |
| Natalia | Denmark | The galiot was driven ashore and wrecked between Burnham Overy Staithe and Cley-next-the-Sea with the loss of her captain. She was on a voyage from London to Copenhagen. |
| Neath Castle | United Kingdom | The ship foundered in the North Sea off Wainfleet. |
| Neptune | United Kingdom | The ship was driven ashore and wrecked near "Pontuval", Finistère, France. Her crew were rescued. She was on a voyage from Rio de Janeiro, Empire of Brazil to Hamburg. |
| Neutral Fisher | United Kingdom | The schooner capsized in The Wash off King's Lynn with the loss of two of her crew. |
| Nouvelle Alliance | France | The ship was wrecked near Saint-Jean-de-Luz, Basses-Pyrénées. She was on a voyage from Havre de Grâce to Bayonne. |
| Palm Tree | Norway | The ship was driven ashore and wrecked at St. Ives. |
| Pandora | United Kingdom | The ship was driven ashore at Brancaster, Norfolk. |
| Paris | France | The ship was driven ashore at Oudenaarde, West Flanders, Netherlands. All on board were rescued. She was on a voyage from New York, United States to Havre de Grâce. |
| Peace | United Kingdom | The ship was driven ashore between Burnham Overy Staithe and Cley-next-the-Sea. Her crew were rescued. She was later refloated and taken in to Wells-next-the-Sea. |
| Peace | United Kingdom | The ship was driven ashore between Cleethorpes and Grimsby. She was on a voyage from London to South Shields. Peace was later refloated and taken in to Hull, where she arrived on 18 November. |
| Peggy | United Kingdom | The ship was driven ashore and wrecked between Cleethorpes and Grimsby. |
| Phœnix | United Kingdom | The ship was driven ashore between King's Lynn and Terrington Marshes. Her crew were rescued. She was later refloated and taken in to King's Lynn. |
| Plenty | United Kingdom | The ship was driven ashore between Cleethorpes and Grimsby. She was refloated by 21 November and taken in to Hull. |
| Pomona | United Kingdom | The ship was driven ashore between Cleethorpes and Grimsby. |
| Prince of Saxe Coburg | United Kingdom | The ship was driven ashore and wrecked near Mundesley. Her crew were rescued. She was on a voyage from Shoreham-by-Sea, Sussex to Sunderland. |
| Queen of Trumps | United Kingdom | The schooner was run down and sunk in the North Sea off Great Yarmouth. Her crew survived. |
| Retford | United Kingdom | The ship was wrecked at Cape Cornwall with the loss of all hands. |
| Reward of Industry | United Kingdom | The ship was driven ashore between Cleethorpes and Grimsby. |
| Richard | United Kingdom | The ship was wrecked at Cape Cornwall. |
| Royal Charlotte | United Kingdom | The ship was driven ashore and severely damaged at Saint-Vaast-la-Hougue, Manche, France. All on board were rescued. She was on a voyage from Southampton to Jersey. |
| Samuel | United Kingdom | The brig was driven ashore at St. Ives. Her crew were rescued. |
| Samuel Whitbread | United Kingdom | The ship was driven ashore between King's Lynn and Terrington Marshes. Her crew were rescued. |
| Sandwich | United Kingdom | The ship was driven ashore on the Île de Batz, Finistère. She was on a voyage from Cowes, Isle of Wight to Saint Lucia. Sandwich was later refloated and taken in to Roscoff, Finistère. |
| Shepherd | United Kingdom | The ship was driven ashore between Cleethorpes and Grimsby. She was later refloated and taken in to Hull, where she arrived on 18 November. |
| Shoreham | United Kingdom | The brig was driven ashore between Cleethorpes and Grimsby. |
| Sir Francis Freeling | United Kingdom | The ship was driven ashore and severely damaged at Castle Cornet, Guernsey. She was refloated and taken in to St Peter Port. |
| Speculation | United Kingdom | The collier was driven ashore near Grimsby. |
| Speedwell | United Kingdom | The ship was driven ashore between Cleethorpes and Grimsby. |
| Stephen | United Kingdom | The ship was driven ashore at Burnham Overy Staithe. |
| Sterling Hill | United Kingdom | The ship was driven ashore between Cleethorpes and Grimsby. She was refloated on 18 November and taken in to Grimsby. |
| St. Hilaire | France | The ship was wrecked at Auray. |
| St. Louis | France | The ship was driven ashore at Cherbourg. She was on a voyage from Landerneau, Finistère to Rouen. |
| Stockton | United Kingdom | The ship was driven ashore at Castle Cornet, Guernsey. She was later refloated. |
| Stokesley | United Kingdom | The ship was driven ashore between Cleethorpes and Grimsby. |
| Streamlet | United Kingdom | The ship was driven ashore and severely damaged at Sunderland, County Durham. She was refloated on 4 November and taken in to Sunderland. |
| Success | France | The ship was driven ashore south of Havre de Grâce, Seine-Inférieure. She was on a voyage from Martinique to Rouen, Seine-Inférieure. |
| Susannah | United Kingdom | The ship was driven ashore at Saint-Brieuc. She was on a voyage from London to Waterford. Susannah was later refloated; repairs were completed by 21 November. |
| Sussex | United Kingdom | The ship was presumed to have foundered on this date. |
| Telegraph | United Kingdom | The ship was driven ashore between Cleethorpes and Grimsby. |
| Thetis | United Kingdom | The collier was driven ashore between Cleethorpes and Grimsby. She was refloated by 21 November and taken in to Hull. |
| Thomas | United Kingdom | The ship was driven ashore between Cleethorpes and Grimsby. She was later refloated. |
| Thomas | United Kingdom | The ship was driven ashore and wrecked near St. Ives. |
| Three Sisters | United Kingdom | The brig was driven ashore between Barrow-upon-Humber and Grimsby, Lincolnshire. |
| Trader | United Kingdom | The ship was driven ashore at Padstow, where she was scuttled. Trader was refloated on 3 November and taken in to Padstow. |
| Trusty | United Kingdom | The ship was driven ashore at Scarborough. Her crew were rescued by the Scarborough Lifeboat. Trusty was refloated on 7 November and taken in to Scarborough in a severely damaged condition. |
| Two Brothers | United Kingdom | The ship was driven ashore at Portishead. She was refloated on 3 November. |
| Tyne | United Kingdom | The ship was driven ashore at Fraserburgh, Aberdeenshire. Her crew were rescued. Tyne was refloated on 21 November and taken in to Fraserburgh. |
| Union | United Kingdom | The ship was driven ashore near King's Lynn. She was on a voyage from Málaga, Spain to London. |
| Venus | United Kingdom | The brig was driven ashore at Corton. Her ten crew were rescued by rocket apparatus. She was on a voyage from Arundel, Sussex to Aberdeen. |
| Vertumnus | United Kingdom | The ship was driven ashore near Cleethorpes whilst on a voyage from London to South Shields, County Durham. She was refloated on 23 November and taken in to Hull. |
| Victory | United Kingdom | The ship was driven ashore between Burnham Overy Staithe and Cley-next-the-Sea. Her crew were rescued. She was on a voyage from Cley-next-the-Sea to Newcastle upon Tyne, Northumberland. |
| Villager | United Kingdom | The brig foundered in the North Sea off the north Norfolk coast. |
| Vine | United Kingdom | The brig was driven ashore and wrecked between "Patney Haven" and Grimsby. |
| Vrow Gesina | Netherlands | The ship was driven ashore and wrecked at Cherbourg. She was on a voyage from St. Ubes to Antwerp. |
| Whitbread | United Kingdom | The ship was driven ashore at King's Lynn. |
| William | United Kingdom | The ship was driven ashore at Cley-next-the-Sea. Her crew were rescued. |
| William and Francis | United Kingdom | The yawl was driven ashore and wrecked near Winterton-on-Sea, Norfolk with the loss of five of her seven crew. |
| William and Mary | United Kingdom | The ship was driven ashore and wrecked at Blakeney, Norfolk with the loss of all hands. |
| Yorkshire | United Kingdom | The ship was driven ashore at Burnham Overy Staithe, Norfolk with the loss of five of the six people on board. |

== Unknown date ==
List of shipwrecks: Unknown date in October 1823
| Ship | State | Description |
|---|---|---|
| Ann | United Kingdom | The schooner was wrecked 26 nautical miles (48 km) off the Isle of Islay with the loss of all hands. |
| Augustus | United States | The brig was wrecked at Allen's Key, Abaco Islands. She was on a voyage from New Orleans, Louisiana, to St. Thomas, Virgin Islands. |
| Countess of Haddington | United Kingdom | The ship ran aground at Grangemouth, Stirlingshire. She was on a voyage from Wisbech, Cambridgeshire to Grangemouth. |
| Economy | (United Kingdom of Great Britain and Ireland) Granada | The sloop was wrecked in Lalante Bay. |
| Emma | United Kingdom | The ship foundered off Cape Ray, Newfoundland, British North America. Her crew were rescued. She was on a voyage from Liverpool, Lancashire to Quebec City, Lower Canada, British North America. |
| Fame | United States | The ship foundered between Inchcape and Red Head. She was on a voyage from Charleston, South Carolina, to Aberdeen, United Kingdom. |
| Franklin | United States | The brig was wrecked in the Abaco Islands. She was on a voyage from Philadelphia, Pennsylvania, to Pensacola, Florida. |
| Friend's Goodwill | United Kingdom | The ship was driven ashore between Burnham Overy Staithe and Cley-next-the-Sea. Her crew were rescued. she was on a voyage from Sheerness, Kent to Sunderland, County Durham. |
| George & Ann | United Kingdom | The ship was lost in late October. |
| Goede Haab | Norway | The ship departed from Stavanger before 24 October for a Baltic port. No further trace, presumed foundered with the loss of all hands. |
| Hilton | United Kingdom | The ship was driven ashore near Wells-next-the-Sea at the end of October. |
| Industry | (United Kingdom of Great Britain and Ireland) British North America | The schooner was lost whilst on a voyage from Placentia Bay to St. John's, Newfoundland. |
| Isabella | United Kingdom | The ship was abandoned in the Atlantic Ocean with some loss of life. Survivors were rescued by Levant (French Navy). Isabella was on a voyage from North America to Workington, Cumberland. |
| James | United Kingdom | The ship was driven ashore near Wells-next-the-Sea at the end of October. |
| Mary | (United Kingdom of Great Britain and Ireland) British North America | The ship was lost in Trinity Bay, Newfoundland. |
| Plover | United Kingdom | The ship was lost in late October. |
| Royal Oak | United Kingdom | The ship foundered in the Atlantic Ocean with the loss of all but three of her crew. The survivors were rescued by Margaret (United Kingdom). She was on a voyage from Quebec City to Hull, Yorkshire. |
| St. Johannes | Prussia | The ship was wrecked whilst on a voyage from Liverpool, Lancashire, United Kingdom to Barth. |
| St. Patrick | United Kingdom | The ship was abandoned in the Atlantic Ocean. Her crew were rescued by Levant (French Navy). St. Patrick was on a voyage from North America to London. |
| Titus | United Kingdom | The ship struck a rock off Tenedos, Ottoman Empire and was wrecked. She was on a voyage from Alexandria, Egypt to Constantinople, Ottoman Empire. |
| Tyne | United States | The schooner was wrecked in the Abaco Islands. |
| Wasp | United States | The sloop was wrecked on the coast of Florida. She was on a voyage from Havana, Cuba to Savannah, Georgia. |
| William | United Kingdom | The ship departed from Sunderland, County Durham in mid-October. No further trace, presumed foundered in the North Sea with the loss of all hands. |
