= Dutch Emigrant Artillery =

The Dutch Emigrant Artillery Corps was a mercenary unit of the British Army raised in Hanover in 1795. The still extant companies in 1803 were amalgamated into the Royal Foreign Artillery. The units were among the large number of foreign units in British service during the French Revolutionary and Napoleonic Wars. The Royal Foreign Artillery was disbanded in 1815.

== Origins ==
Jeanne-Etienne Fourier de Nacquard established the unit on 29 March 1795. He had commanded an artillery company of French émigrées and Dutch troops in Dutch service in 1793. When the Anglo-Hanoverian forces retreated he took his unit with them to Hanover. There he put it in English service in January 1795. When he received permission to form a unit he drew on the men that he had brought with him. A second, separate company was formed in August, and in October the two companies came together at Stade. The Dutch Emigrant Artillery was then formally established on 8 December 1795, with now major Nacquard in command. His brother, le chevalier de Nacquard, commanded the second company. The British intent was station the unit in the West Indies, where they would serve in forts as part of the coast artillery alongside units of the Royal Artillery.

== Move to England ==
On 15 December the unit embarked at Stade for England, and by the end of the month it had arrived at the Isle of Wight. There they were assigned to a brigade under Sir John Moore, together with La Tour's Royal Foreigners and Hompesch's hussars.

The Corps embarked for the West indies in March 1796 and arrived at Môle-Saint-Nicolas at the beginning of June. The brothers did not accompany the companies but rather stayed in England where they established a depot at Lymington. They also established a third, depot company, under the command of Captain de Ménard. (Note: This may have been Captain Pierre François Charles de Ménard. He was appointed Captain in 1796, brevet Major in 1808, Lieut-Colonel in 1814, and was put on half-pay in 1817.)

Formally, the corps consisted of three companies, each of four officers and 107 men. There was also a HQ staff of six men.

== West Indies ==
The move to the West indies was part of Admiral Hugh Cloberry Christian's expedition to the West Indies. After numerous false starts aborted by weather issues, the fleet sailed on 26 April to invade St Lucia, with troops under Lieutenant-General Sir Ralph Abercromby. St Lucia surrendered to the British on 25 May. The British went on to capture Saint Vincent and Grenada. sir John Moore accompanied Abercromby. Some part of the Corps apparently participated in the campaign.

After the Corps arrived in Haiti it was broken into smaller detachments. Still, the 1st company essentially remained at Môle-Saint-Nicolas. The 2nd company was assigned to Port-au-Prince. In May 1797 the British, including the 2nd Company, attacked Mirebalais and Grand-Bois and recaptured them from Toussaint Louverture, who had expelled his rivals there.

Major de Nacquard died on 23 June 1796. His brother replaced him as commander of the Corps, and received promotion to Major on 15 July. The 3rd Company remained at the depot in Lymington. The Corps also had a small recruiting office on the continent. Major de Nacquard in 1798 brought out to San Domingo a draft of troops drawn from the 3rd company. The Corps had a high casualty rate from disease and was consistently understrength.

In 1798 the companies served with distinction in the defense of the fort at Les Irois, and at Jérémie in the Grand'Anse department. de Nacquard returned to England in July. The British evacuated San Domingo in October 1798 with the Corps arriving at Port Royal, Jamaica, on 12 October.

The third company, under the command of Captain de Ménard, left England in October on the armed merchantman Achilles, bound for Jamaica. On 3 December 1799, in the latitude of San Domingo, they encountered and engaged the French privateer Entreprenante. Towards the end of the engagement the troops boarded the French ship and captured her. In the combat the French suffered somewhere between 75 and 100 dead and wounded, and the British, including the Dutch company, suffered one man killed and 14 wounded. Achilles then delivered her troops to Port Royal.

The corps sent two officers and 24 men to the Bahamas. In 1801 it also stationed a detachment at Curaçao. In November 1801 the depot moved from Lymington to East Cowes.

== Peace of Amiens ==
The end of the war after the Treaty of Amiens saw the corps reduced as an economy measure. The first company transferred an officer and 39 gunners to the third company, and then was disbanded. the second company sailed for Lymington in March 1803. The depot moved to Hurst Castle in April 1803, and then moved back to Lymmington where its men were incorporated into the returning second company and the depot closed.

The third company remained in Jamaica as "Menard's supernumerary company attached to the Royal Artillery for service at Jamaica". Detachments served at Port Antonio, Montego Bay, and Rock Fort. With the activation of the Royal Foreign Artillery, the two companies of the Dutch Emigrant Artillery were amalgamated into it. de Nacquard and de Ménard are listed in 1810 among the officers of the Royal Foreign Artillery.
