= Achilles (1781 ship) =

History

Great Britain
- Name: Achilles
- Namesake: Achilles
- Owner: Michael Humble and Stephen Todd
- Builder: Sunderland
- Launched: 1781
- Fate: Captured 1801

General characteristics
- Tons burthen: Pre-lengthening:390, or 450 (bm); Post 1794:507, or 508 (bm)
- Length: 102 ft 7 in (31.3 m) (pre lengthening)
- Beam: 30 ft 3 in (9.2 m)
- Depth of hold: 7 ft 10 in (2.4 m)
- Propulsion: Sail
- Complement: 30
- Armament: 1794: 10 × 6-pounder guns; 1797:20 × 6&4-pounder guns + 12 swivel guns; 1801:12 × 6-pounder + 4 × 4-pounder guns + 2 × 4-pounder carronades
- Notes: Two decks and three masts

Achilles was a merchant vessel launched at Sunderland in 1781, probably under another name. She traded widely, particularly to the West Indies. She made one voyage for the British East India Company (EIC). She was also the victor in 1799 in a sanguinary single-ship action against a French privateer. She herself fell victim in 1801 to a French privateer.

== Career ==
Achilles first appeared in Lloyd's Register (LR) in 1786, having undergone repairs, with M[ark] Harvey, master, and trade Liverpool—St Petersburg, changing to Liverpool—New York. (Note: Achilles may have been Magdalen, of 400 tons (bm), launched at Sunderland in 1781. She is the only vessel with those characteristics that appeared in the 1784 volume of Lloyd's Register, and not in the 1786 volume.)

On 12 April 1787 John Pile became her master. Joseph Humble replaced him in 1792, but Pile again assumed command on 14 March 1793. Lloyd's List reported on 29 April 1794 that Achilles, Pile, master, had run aground while leaving Liverpool for Quebec and had had to be unloaded to effect repairs.

| Year | Master | Owner | Trade | Source & notes |
|---|---|---|---|---|
| 1794 | J.Pile; R.Hogg | Humble & Co. | Liverpool–Virginia | LR; repairs 1786 & 1792 |

Achilles underwent lengthening in 1794 that increased her burthen. Lloyd's Register for 1795 gave her master's name as R. Hogg, and her trade as Liverpool—Africa. However, she does not appear in the most comprehensive database of Liverpool-based slave ships. Apparently there was a change of plans.

Captain Robert Hogg left Liverpool on 24 August 1795, bound for Bengal. Achilles reached Bengal on 11 February 1796. Homeward bound, she was in the Hugli River on 25 March and at Culpee on 4 April. She reached St Helena on 24 July and Crookhaven on 26 November, and arrived at Blackwall on 15 December.

On her return Achilles underwent a thorough repair. Captain Hogg then acquired a letter of marque on 17 August 1797.

=== Achilles and Entreprenante ===
In late 1799 the British Government hired Achilles to transport a company of the Dutch Emigrant Artillery Corps from England to Jamaica. Captain de Menard commanded the company, which consisted of probably a little over 100 Hanoverians. The description of the action below is from his letter to Major Nacquard, the commander of the Corps.

On 2 December, at about 4a.m., Achilles was in the latitude of San Domingo when lookouts saw a large vessel sailing towards them. The British feared that this was a 44-gun French frigate. Achilles cleared for action and at 8 am saw that the French vessel had altered her course and that people aboard her were throwing things overboard. Hogg set off to intercept and by about 9:30 a.m. got close enough for an engagement to commence. de Menard had his small arms men fire on the French vessel but kept most of his men out of harm's way below deck. The French vessel thought that it was dealing with a lightly-manned merchant vessel and attempted to put boarders on Achilles. After about three-quarters of an hour Achilles was in a position for the Hanoverian soldiers hidden below deck to come out and board the French vessel. The Anglo-Hanoverian boarding party quickly cleared the French deck and took command of the vessel.

The French vessel proved to be the privateer corvette Entreprenante of four 12–pounder and fourteen 6-pounder guns, and 195 men under the command of Captain Jos. Durant. French casualties, by de Menard's account of this action, amounted to 100 men killed and wounded, Durant and three of his officers being among the killed. British and Dutch casualties amounted to one man killed and 14 wounded.

On 31 January 1800, Lloyd's List reported that Achilles, Hogg, master, had captured the French letter of marque corvette Intreprenant. Intreprenant was sailing out of Curaçao. Lloyd's List gave the size of the French crew as 130 men, and the French casualties as 25 men killed and 50 wounded. Achilles had one man killed and several wounded. Achilles brought Intreprenant into Jamaica.

== Fate ==
Lloyd's Register for (1802), published in 1801, gave the name of Achilles's master as R. Hogg and of her owner as Humble. Her trade was London—Jamaica.

Achilles, late Hogg, master, had sailed from Honduras and Charleston for London when on 19 April 1801 she encountered a French privateer of 20 guns and 200 men. She struck after an engagement of two-and-a-half hours.
