= Achilles (1813 ship) =

British merchantman and whaler 1813–1830

History

United Kingdom
- Name: Achilles
- Namesake: Achilles
- Builder: Wright & Harle, South Shields
- Launched: 1813
- Fate: Lost 1830

General characteristics
- Tons burthen: 366, or 367(bm)
- Complement: 52 (1813)
- Armament: 8 guns

Achilles was launched in 1813 at Shields. She sailed from Shields to London and then operated for some years as a transport. She later traded more generally. In 1820 new owners moved her to Dundee. She became a whaler in the British northern whale fishery until she was lost there in 1830.

== Career ==
Achilles first appeared in the Register of Shipping (RS), and in Lloyd's Register (LR) in 1813.

| Year | Master | Owner | Trade | Source |
|---|---|---|---|---|
| 1813 | Potter | Wright & Co. | Shields–London | RS |
| 1813 | Leishman | Leishman | London transport | LR |
| 1818 | Leishman; W.Shaw | Leishman | London–St Johns; Bristol–Jamaica | LR |

The data below is from the Scottish Arctic Whaling Database. All the voyages were to Davis Strait.

Although the information in Lloyd's Register remained unchanged for some more years, in 1820 new owners, Newell & Co., shifted Achilles's registry to Dundee and started sailing her as a whaler.

| Year | Master | Whales | Tuns whale oil |
|---|---|---|---|
| 1820 | W.Deuchers | 3 | 38 |
| 1821 | W.Valentine | 9 | 125 |
| 1822 | W.Valentine | 5 | 80 |
| 1823 | W.Valentine | 37 | 252 |
| 1824 | W.Valentine | 2 | 35 |

On 19 October 1824, Valentine and Achilles encountered HMS Griper, under the command of Captain George Lyon, which was on an expedition to discover the Northwest Passage. Valentine informed Lyon of the ice conditions and weather, which had resulted in a weak whaling season and blocked much of Hudson's Strait. Achilles was homeward bound so Lyon sent duplicate dispatches with her.

| Year | Master | Whales | Tuns whale oil |
|---|---|---|---|
| 1825 | W.Valentine | 7 | 84 |
| 1826 | W.Valentine | 7 | 108 |
| 1827 | W.Valentine | 22 | 217 |
| 1828 | W.Valentine | 24 | 220 |
| 1829 | J.Hogg | 7 | 96 |
| 1830 | R.Thoms | 0 | 0 |

== Fate ==
Achilles, Valentine, master, was lost in 1830 in the Davis Strait. (Note: Although the database names R. Thoms as master of Achilles when she was lost, all the press reports give the name of her master as Valentine. Thoms was master of another Dundee whaler, Thomas.)

Achilles was lost on 2 June 1830. Valentine came home on William and Ann.

Eighteen-thirty was the worst year for ship losses since 1819, when whalers first crossed the straits. Eighteen whalers were lost, for a total tonnage of 5,614 tons (bm). The second highest loss occurred in 1823 when 13 vessels totaling 4,409 tons (bm), were lost.
