= Achilles (1799 ship) =

British merchantman (1799–1839)

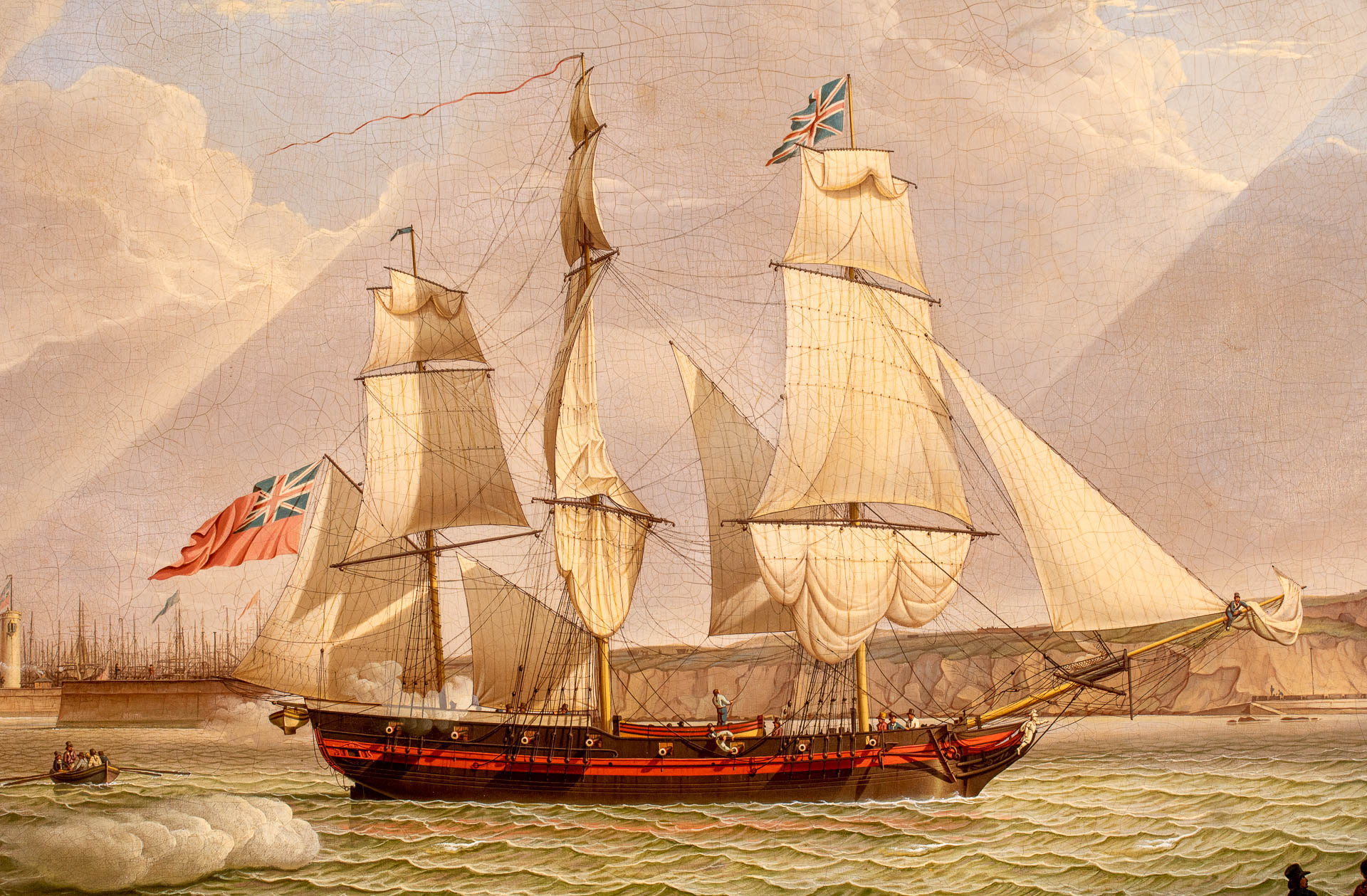
- The West Indian Packet Achilles (a detail from a painting), by Robert Salmon

History

Great Britain
- Name: Achilles
- Namesake: Achilles
- Builder: Thomas Wake, Monkwearmouth
- Launched: 1799
- Fate: Foundered 29 October 1839

General characteristics
- Tons burthen: 1799: 199, or 201, or 202 (bm); 1835: 255 (bm)
- Length: 1799: 80 ft 0 in (24.4 m); 1835: 92 ft 3 in (28.1 m)
- Beam: 1799: 24 ft 8 in (7.5 m); 1835: 25 ft 3 in (7.7 m)
- Sail plan: Snow
- Armament: 4 × 4-pounder guns

Achilles was built at Sunderland in 1799. Although early on she made some voyages to the West Indies, she spent most of her mercantile career trading with the Baltic and northern Russia, and as a coaster. However, between about 1810 and 1814, she served as a transport under Transport Board. She suffered three maritime mishaps before 1835 and assisted at a fourth. She was lengthened in 1835. Her crew abandoned her in October 1839 and she subsequently foundered.

== Career ==
In 1799 Achilles, Haddock, master, was already trading with Petersburg. Achilles first appeared in the Register of Shipping (RS) in 1800, and in Lloyd's Register (LR) in 1801.

Year	Master	Owner	Trade	Source
1800	Haddock	Atkinson	Newcastle coaster	RS
1801	T.Beswick; S.Corney	T.Atkins	London–Demerara	LR
1802	S.Corney	T.Atkins	London–St Kitts	LR & RS
1804	Weatherby	Captain & Co.	Newcastle–Baltic	RS
1809	Weatherby	Captain & Co.	Newcastle–Baltic	RS; damage repaired 1803

On 18 December 1808, Brighton Packet, of Deal, was in a sinking state. Achilles took off Brighton Packet's crew and brought them into Torbay. On 20 December, Achilles, Weatherby, master, came into Torbay. She had been sailing from Portsmouth to Newcastle when she had been driven off St Valery.

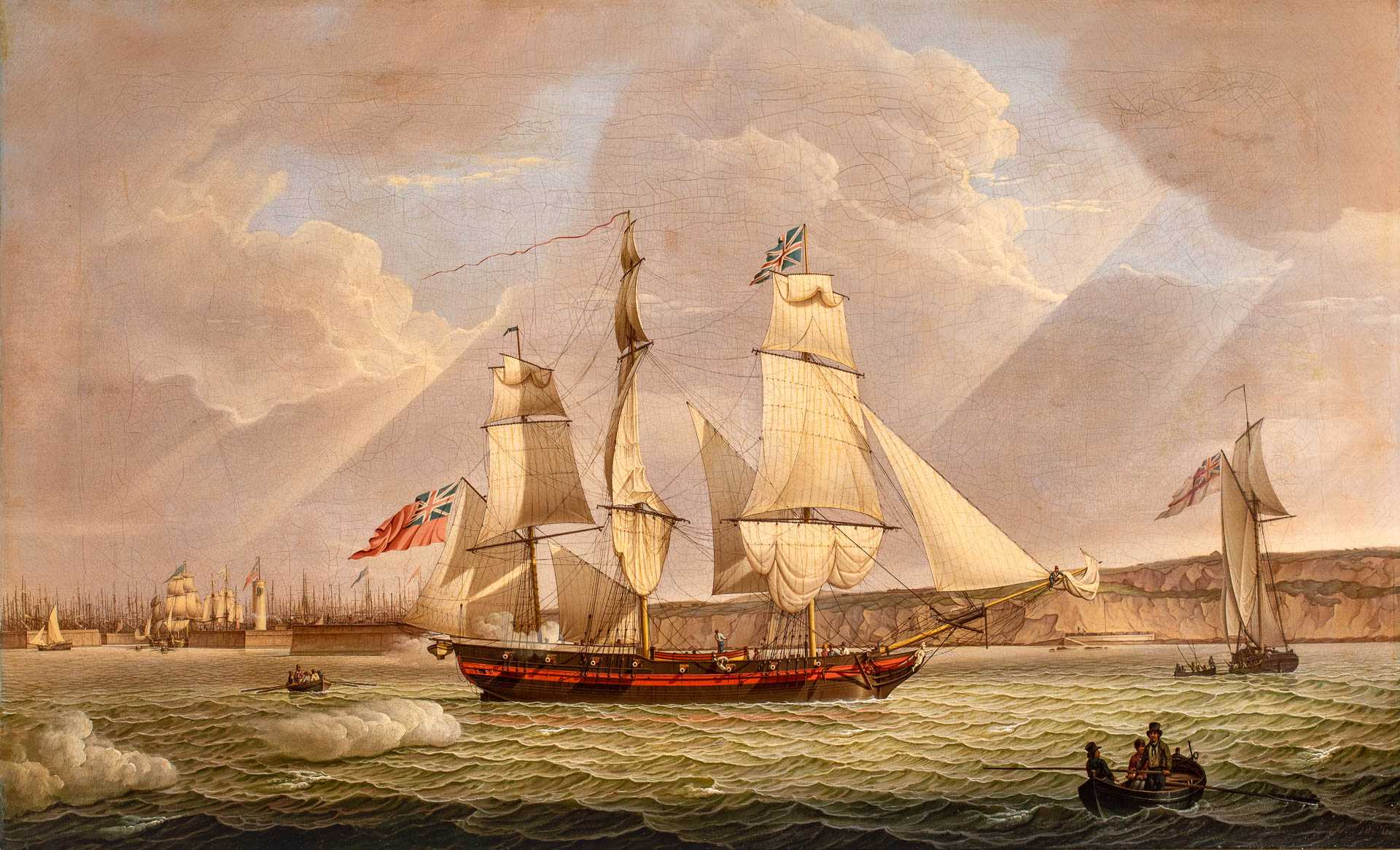
The complete picture, by Robert Salmon. The protected harbour of Whitehaven in the background.

Achilles re-entered the Register of Shipping with the volume for 1816.

Year	Master	Owner	Trade	Source & notes
1816	Wedderburn	Kirkley	Shields–London	RS
1818	Wedderburn; Kirkley	Kirkley	Shields–London	RS; new tops and sides and good repair 1818

On 24 December 1818, Achilles, of South Shields, was sailing from Newcastle to London with a cargo of coal when Beaver, Lyle, master, ran into her. Beaver was sailing from London to Banff, her crew was not watching out, and Achilles's crew was not able to get their attention. Beaver sank but Achilles rescued the crew.

Year	Master	Owner	Trade	Source & notes
1820	Kirkley	Kirkley	Hull coaster	RS; new tops and sides and good repair 1818

On 2 October 1823 a storm caught Achilles, Kirkley, master, between the Spurn and the floating light. Achilles lost her foremast and bowsprit. Two smacks came out and towed her into Hull.

Year	Master	Owner	Trade	Source & notes
1824	Kirkley	Kirkley	Hull coaster	RS; new tops and sides and good repair 1818
1825	Kirkle	Kirkle	Hull coaster	LR; new deck & large repair 1818, new wales 1820, & repairs 1823
1826	Elliot	Kirkley	"Sw"–London	RS; new tops and sides & good repair 1818, & repairs 1823
1827	Scotland	Kirkley	"Sw"–London	RS; new tops and sides & good repair 1818, repairs 1823, & large repair 1826

On 21 April 1829, Achilles, Scotland, master, struck a rock. She was towed into Loch Tarbert in a sinking state.

Year	Master	Owner	Trade	Source & notes
1832	Kirkley	Kirkley	Yarmouth coaster	RS; repair 1823, & large repair 1826
1834	Dickinson			LR
1835	Dickinson; Crawford	Kell & Son	Newcastle–London	LR; lengthened & thorough repair 1835

== Fate ==
On 20 October 1839 Achilles, Patten, master, was on a voyage from South Shields to London with a cargo of coal. She anchored off Cromer, having lost her mainmast and foretopmast. Her crew abandoned her, coming ashore in the lifeboats. She foundered on 29 October.

Her entry in the 1839 volume of Lloyd's Register carried the annotation "Foundered".
