= List of Ceylonese executive councils =

This is a list of Ceylonese executive councils from its inception on 13 March 1833 until the creation of the Board of Ministers in 1931.

The Executive Council created in British Ceylon by the British colonial administration on the recommendations of the Colebrooke-Cameron Commission along with the Legislative Council of Ceylon as the legislative body.

At its creation the Executive Council was headed by the Governor, along with five members appointed by the Governor. These five members were officials who held the posts of the Colonial Secretary, the Attorney General, the Auditor-General, the Treasurer and the General Officer Commanding, Ceylon. The Council exercised executive power and advised the governor. As a result of the First Manning Reforms three non-officials were elected to the executive council.

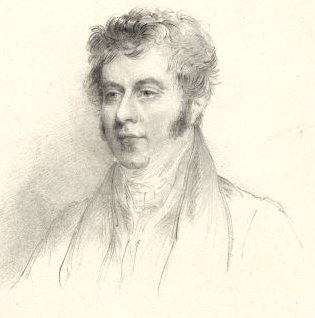
Robert Wilmot-Horton

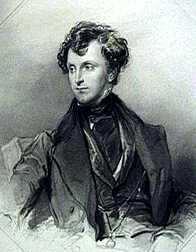
James Emerson Tennent

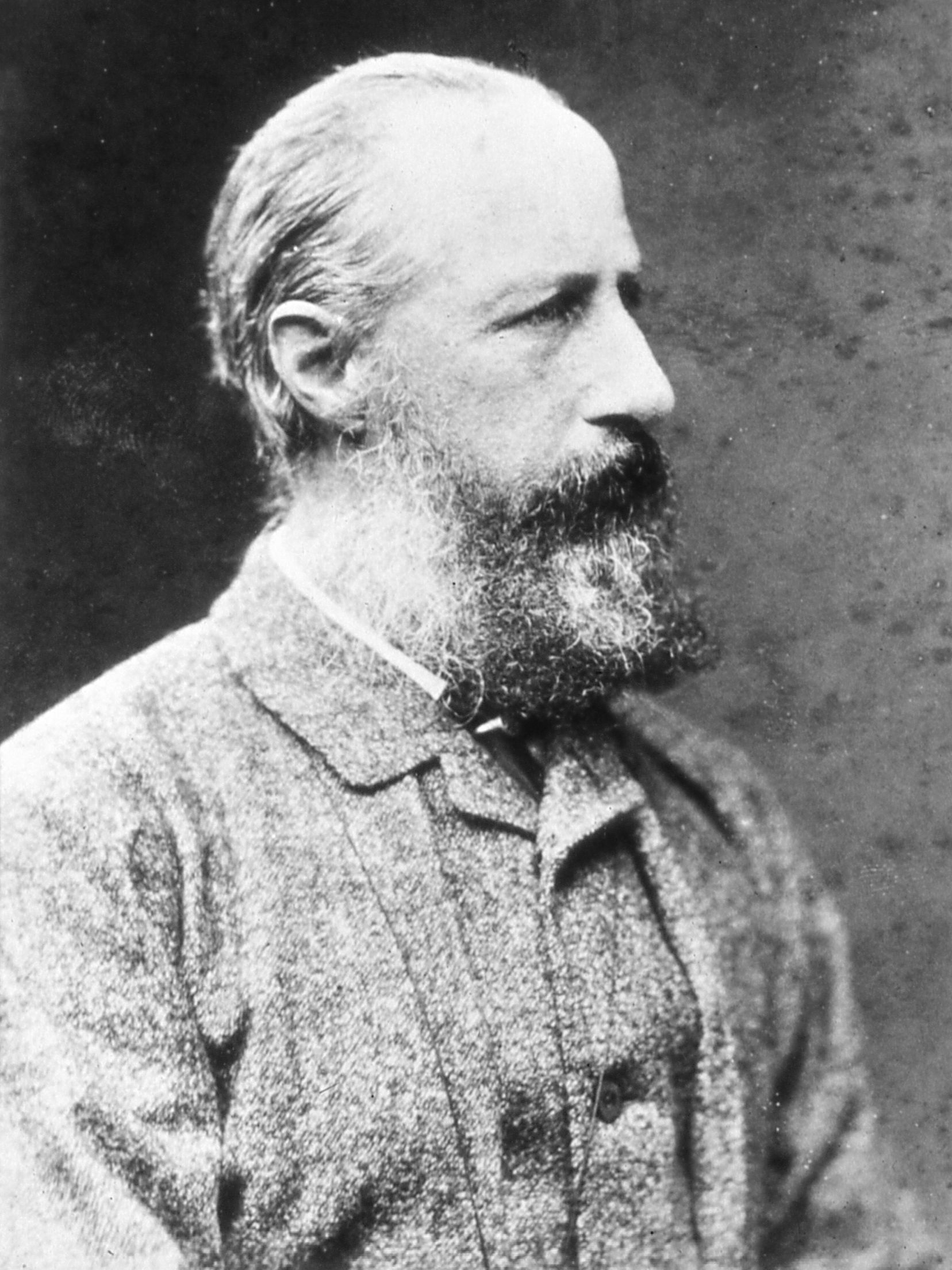
Arthur Hamilton-Gordon

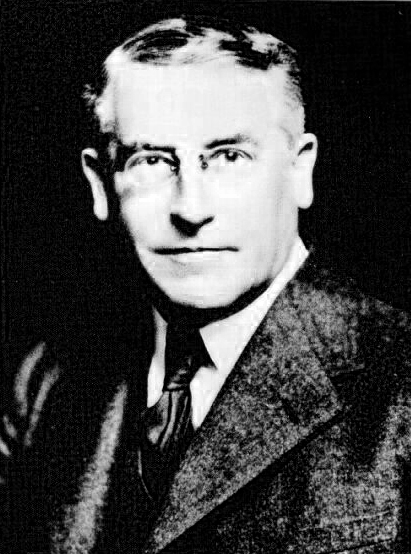
Reginald Edward Stubbs

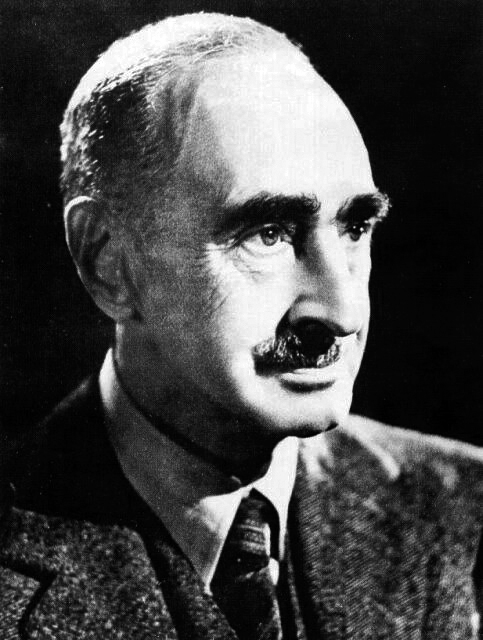
Andrew Caldecott

== List of governors by monarch ==
Date	Monarch	Head of Government
1833	William IV (1833-1837); Queen Victoria (1837-1837)	Robert Wilmot-Horton
1837	Queen Victoria	James Alexander Stewart-Mackenzie
1841	Queen Victoria	Colin Campbell
1847	Queen Victoria	Viscount Torrington
1850	Queen Victoria	George William Anderson
1855	Queen Victoria	Henry George Ward
1860	Queen Victoria	Charles Justin MacCarthy
1865	Queen Victoria	Hercules Robinson
1872	Queen Victoria	William Henry Gregory
1877	Queen Victoria	James Robert Longden
1883	Queen Victoria	Arthur Hamilton-Gordon
1890	Queen Victoria	Arthur Havelock
1896	Queen Victoria (1896-1901); Edward VII (1901-1903)	West Ridgeway
1903	Edward VII	Henry Arthur Blake
1907	Edward VII (1907-1910); George V (1910-1913)	Henry Edward McCallum
1913	George V	Robert Chalmers
1916	George V	John Anderson
1918	George V	William Manning
1925	George V	Hugh Clifford
1928	George V	Herbert Stanley
1931	George V	Graeme Thomson
Board of Ministers of Ceylon (1931-1947)
1931	George V	First Board of Ministers of Ceylon
1936	Edward VIII (1936); George VI	Second Board of Ministers of Ceylon

== Wilmot-Horton executive council ==
The government was led by Governor Robert Wilmot-Horton.

Portrait	Member of Council	Office	Took office	Left office	Notes
	Robert Wilmot-Horton	Governor	19 March 1833	7 November 1837	
	John Rodney	Colonial Secretary	19 March 1833	1833	Replaced by Philip Anstruther
	Philip Anstruther	Colonial Secretary	1 May 1833	7 November 1837	
	Major general John Wilson	Commander of Troops	19 March 1833	7 November 1837	
	William Norris	Attorney General as Advocate Fiscal	19 March 1833	1833	Replaced by William Ogle Carr
	William Ogle Carr	Attorney General as King's Advocate	2 April 1833	7 November 1837	
	Henry Augustus Marshall	Auditor General as Civil Auditor General	19 March 1833	7 November 1837	
	William Granville	Treasurer	19 March 1833	7 November 1837	

== Stewart-Mackenzie executive council ==
Portrait	Member of Council	Office	Took office	Left office	Notes
	James Alexander Stewart-Mackenzie	Governor	7 November 1837	15 April 1841	
	Philip Anstruther	Colonial Secretary	7 November 1837	15 April 1841	
	Major general Robert Arbuthnot	Commander of Troops	7 November 1837	15 April 1841	
	William Ogle Carr	Attorney General as Queen's Advocate	7 November 1837	1838	Served as King's Advocate; Replaced by John Stark
	John Stark	Attorney General as Queen's Advocate	10 December 1838	1840	Replaced by Arthur William Buller
	Arthur William Buller	Attorney General as Queen's Advocate	17 October 1840	15 April 1841	
	Henry Augustus Marshall	Auditor General	7 November 1837	1 February 1841	Served as Civil Auditor General
	Henry Wright	Auditor General	1 February 1841	15 April 1841	
	William Granville	Treasurer	7 November 1837	1841	Replaced by George Turnour
	George Turnour	Treasurer	1 February 1841	15 April 1841	

== Campbell executive council ==
Portrait	Member of Council	Office	Took office	Left office	Notes
	Colin Campbell	Governor	15 April 1841	19 April 1847	
	Philip Anstruther	Colonial Secretary	15 April 1841	1845	Replaced by James Emerson Tennent
	James Emerson Tennent	Colonial Secretary	29 November 1845	19 April 1847	
	Lieutenant general Colin Campbell	Commander of Troops	16 April 1841	?	
	Arthur William Buller	Attorney General as Queen's Advocate	15 April 1841	19 April 1847	
	Henry Wright	Auditor General	15 April 1841	19 April 1847	
	George Turnour	Treasurer	15 April 1841	1843	Replaced by Francis Templer
	Francis Templer	Treasurer	1 November 1843	19 April 1847	

== Torrington executive council ==
Portrait	Member of Council	Office	Took office	Left office	Notes
	Viscount Torrington	Governor	29 May 1847	18 October 1850	
	James Emerson Tennent	Colonial Secretary	29 May 1847	18 October 1850	
	Major general William Smelt	Commander of Troops	29 May 1847	18 October 1850	
	Arthur William Buller	Attorney General as Queen's Advocate	29 May 1847	1848	Replaced by Henry Collingwood Selby
	Henry Collingwood Selby	Attorney General as Queen's Advocate	23 June 1848	18 October 1850	
	Charles J. MacCarthy	Auditor General	29 May 1847	18 October 1850	
	Francis Templer	Treasurer	29 May 1847	1848	Replaced by Dillon Browne
	Dillon Browne	Treasurer	1848	18 October 1850	

== George William Anderson executive council ==
Portrait	Member of Council	Office	Took office	Left office	Notes
	George William Anderson	Governor	27 November 1850	18 January 1855	
	James Emerson Tennent	Colonial Secretary	27 November 1850	1851	Replaced by Charles Justin MacCarthy
	Charles Justin MacCarthy	Colonial Secretary	2 January 1851	18 January 1855	
	Major general William Smelt	Commander of Troops	27 November 1850	?	Replaced by Philip Bainbrigge
	Major general Philip Bainbrigge	Commander of Troops	23 May 1852	?	Replaced by Thomas Reed
	Major general Thomas Reed	Commander of Troops	13 September 1854	18 January 1855	
	Henry Collingwood Selby	Attorney General as Queen's Advocate	27 November 1850	18 January 1855	
	Charles J. MacCarthy	Auditor General	27 November 1850	1 October 1851	Replaced by W. C. Gibson
	W. C. Gibson	Auditor General	1 October 1851	18 January 1855	
	Dillon Browne	Treasurer	27 November 1850	1854	Replaced by John Caulfield
	John Caulfield	Treasurer	23 October 1854	18 January 1855	

== Ward executive council ==
Portrait	Member of Council	Office	Took office	Left office	Notes
	Henry George Ward	Governor	11 May 1855	30 June 1860	
	Charles Justin MacCarthy	Colonial Secretary	11 May 1855	1860	
	Major general Thomas Reed	Commander of Troops	11 May 1855	?	Replaced by Henry Frederick Lockyer
	Major general Henry Frederick Lockyer	Commander of Troops	1856	30 June 1860	
	Henry Collingwood Selby	Attorney General as Queen's Advocate	11 May 1855	1858	Replaced by Henry Byerley Thomson
	Henry Byerley Thomson	Attorney General as Queen's Advocate	3 May 1858	30 June 1860	
	W. C. Gibson	Auditor General	11 May 1855	30 June 1860	
	John Caulfield	Treasurer	11 May 1855	30 June 1860	

== MacCarthy executive council ==
Portrait	Member of Council	Office	Took office	Left office	Notes
	Charles Justin MacCarthy	Governor	22 October 1860	1 December 1863	
	W. C. Gibson	Colonial Secretary	22 October 1860	1 December 1863	
	Major-General Terence O'Brien	Commander of Troops	1860	?	
	Henry Byerley Thomson	Attorney General as Queen's Advocate	22 October 1860	1863	Replaced by Richard Morgan
	Richard Morgan	Attorney General as Queen's Advocate	1 January 1863	1 December 1863	
	W. C. Gibson	Auditor General	22 October 1860		Replaced by R. T. Pennefeather
	R. T. Pennefeather	Auditor General	24 June 1861	1 December 1863	
	John Caulfield	Treasurer	22 October 1860	1861	Replaced by Frederick Saunders
	Frederick Saunders	Treasurer	5 May 1861	1 December 1863	

== Robinson executive council ==
Portrait	Member of Council	Office	Took office	Left office	Notes
	Hercules Robinson	Governor	16 May 1865	4 January 1872	
	W. C. Gibson	Colonial Secretary	16 May 1865	1869	Replaced by Henry Turner Irving
	Henry Turner Irving	Colonial Secretary	4 June 1869	4 January 1872	
	Major general Studholme John Hodgson	Commander of Troops	1865	?	Replaced by Henry Renny
	Major general Henry Renny	Commander of Troops	1869	?	
	Richard Morgan	Attorney General as Queen's Advocate	16 May 1865	4 January 1872	
	R. T. Pennefeather	Auditor General	16 May 1865	3 January 1866	Replaced by R. J. Callander
	R. J. Callander	Auditor General	3 January 1866	10 March 1870	Replaced by John Douglas
	John Douglas	Auditor General	10 March 1870	4 January 1872	
	Frederick Saunders	Treasurer	16 May 1865	1865	Replaced by George Vane
	George Vane	Treasurer	1 September 1865	4 January 1872	

== Gregory executive council ==
The government was led by Governor William Henry Gregory.

Portrait	Member of Council	Office	Took office	Left office	Notes
	William Henry Gregory	Governor	4 March 1872	4 September 1877	
	Henry Turner Irving	Colonial Secretary	4 March 1872	1873	Replaced by Arthur Birch
	Arthur Birch	Colonial Secretary	3 June 1873	4 September 1877	
	Major general Henry Renny	Commander of Troops	4 March 1872	?	Replaced by John Alfred Street
	Major general John Alfred Street	Commander of Troops	1874	1877	
	Richard Morgan	Attorney General as Queen's Advocate	4 March 1872	1876	Replaced by Richard Cayley
	Richard Cayley	Attorney General as Queen's Advocate	4 April 1876	4 September 1877	
	John Douglas	Auditor General	4 March 1872	16 June 1876	Replaced by C. A. D. Barclay
	C. A. D. Barclay	Auditor General	16 June 1876	4 September 1877	
	George Vane	Treasurer	4 March 1872	4 September 1877	

== Longden executive council ==
Portrait	Member of Council	Office	Took office	Left office	Notes
	James Robert Longden	Governor	4 September 1877	10 July 1883	
	Arthur Birch	Colonial Secretary	4 September 1877	1878	Replaced by John Douglas
	John Douglas	Colonial Secretary	18 August 1878	10 July 1883	
	Major general John Alfred Street	Commander of Troops	4 September 1877	?	Replaced by William Wilby
	Major general William Wilby	Commander of Troops	1879	10 July 1883	
	Richard Cayley	Attorney General as Queen's Advocate	4 September 1877	1879	Replaced by Bruce Burnside
	Bruce Burnside	Attorney General as Queen's Advocate	24 October 1879	1883	
	W. H. Ravenscroft	Auditor General	4 September 1877	10 July 1883	
	George Vane	Treasurer	4 September 1877	1882	Replaced by William D. Wright
	William Dumaresq Wright	Treasurer	22 June 1882	10 July 1883	

== Hamilton-Gordon executive council ==
Portrait	Member of Council	Office	Took office	Left office	Notes
	Arthur Hamilton-Gordon	Governor	3 December 1883	28 May 1890	
	John Douglas	Colonial Secretary	3 December 1883	1885	Replaced by Cecil Clementi Smith
	Cecil Clementi Smith	Colonial Secretary	17 November 1885	1887	Replaced by Edward Noël Walker
	Edward Noël Walker	Colonial Secretary	10 November 1887	28 May 1890	
	Major general William Wilby	Commander of Troops	3 December 1883	1886	Replaced by Francis Conninsby Hannan Clarke
	Lieutenant colonel Francis Conninsby Hannan Clarke	Commander of the Ceylon Volunteers	20 April 1888	28 May 1890	
	Francis Flemming	Attorney General	3 December 1883	1886	Replaced by Samuel Grenier
	Samuel Grenier	Attorney General	30 September 1886	28 May 1890	
	W. H. Ravenscroft	Auditor General	3 December 1883	28 May 1890	
	William Dumaresq Wright	Treasurer	3 December 1883	1886	Replaced by George Thomas Michael O'Brien
	George Thomas Michael O'Brien	Treasurer	6 August 1886	1890	

== Havelock executive council ==
Portrait	Member of Council	Office	Took office	Left office	Notes
	Arthur Havelock	Governor	28 May 1890	24 October 1895	
	Edward Noël Walker	Colonial Secretary	28 May 1890	24 October 1895	
	Lieutenant colonel Francis Conninsby Hannan Clarke	Commander of the Ceylon Volunteers	28 May 1890	27 August 1893	Replaced by Henry Byrde
	Lieutenant colonel Henry Byrde	Commander of the Ceylon Volunteers	28 August 1893	24 October 1895	
	Samuel Grenier	Attorney General	28 May 1890	1892	Replaced by Charles Layard
	Charles Layard	Attorney General	1 November 1892	24 October 1895	
	W. H. Ravenscroft	Auditor General	28 May 1890	18 October 1890	Replaced by George Thomas Michael O'Brien
	George Thomas Michael O'Brien	Auditor General	18 October 1890	31 July 1891	Replaced by J. A. Swettenham
	J. A. Swettenham	Auditor General	31 July 1891	10 June 1895	Replaced by J. A. Taylor
	William Thomas Taylor	Auditor General	10 June 1895	24 October 1895	
	George Thomas Michael O'Brien	Treasurer	28 May 1890	1890	Replaced by Frederick Richard Saunders
	Frederick Richard Saunders	Treasurer	18 October 1890	24 October 1895	

== Ridgeway executive council ==
Portrait	Member of Council	Office	Took office	Left office	Notes
	Joseph West Ridgeway	Governor	10 February 1896	19 November 1903	
	Edward Noël Walker	Colonial Secretary	10 February 1896	1901	Replaced by Everard im Thurn
	Everard im Thurn	Colonial Secretary	18 June 1901	19 November 1903	
	Lieutenant colonel Henry Byrde	Commander of the Ceylon Volunteers	10 February 1896	13 May 1896	Replaced by A. F. C. Vincent
	Colonel A. F. C. Vincent	Commander of the Ceylon Volunteers	13 May 1896	19 November 1903	Served as Commander of the Ceylon Volunteers Force
	Charles Layard	Attorney General	10 February 1896	1902	Replaced by Alfred Lascelles
	Alfred Lascelles	Attorney General	18 June 1902	19 November 1903	
	William Thomas Taylor	Auditor General	10 February 1896	1 March 1902	Replaced by F. R. Ellis
	F. R. Ellis	Auditor General	1 March 1902	19 November 1903	
	Frederick Richard Saunders	Treasurer	10 February 1896	1899	Replaced by L. F. Lee
	Lionel Frederick Lee	Treasurer	1 April 1899	1899	Replaced by Charles Pennycuick
	Charles Edward Ducat Pennycuick	Treasurer	5 December 1899	1901	Replaced by H. H. Cameron
	Hardinge Hay Cameron	Treasurer	11 June 1901	19 November 1903	

== Blake executive council ==
Portrait	Member of Council	Office	Took office	Left office	Notes
	Henry Arthur Blake	Governor	3 December 1903	11 July 1907	
	Everard im Thurn	Colonial Secretary	3 December 1903	1904	Replaced by Alexander Murray Ashmore
	Alexander Murray Ashmore	Colonial Secretary	10 September 1904	7 December 1906	Replaced by ?
	?	Colonial Secretary	1906	11 July 1907	
	Colonel A. F. C. Vincent	Commander of the Ceylon Volunteers Force	3 December 1903	11 July 1907	
	Alfred George Lascelles	Attorney General	3 December 1903	11 July 1907	
	F. R. Ellis	Auditor General	3 December 1903	1 March 1907	Replaced by Bernard Senior
	Bernard Senior	Auditor General	1 March 1907	11 July 1907	Served as Colonial Auditor
	Hardinge Hay Cameron	Treasurer	3 December 1903	1904	Replaced by H. C. Nicolle
	Hilgrove Clement Nicolle	Treasurer	6 September 1904	11 July 1907	

== McCallum executive council ==
Portrait	Member of Council	Office	Took office	Left office	Notes
	Henry Edward McCallum	Governor	24 August 1907	24 January 1913	
	Hugh Clifford	Colonial Secretary	24 August 1907		
	Colonel A. F. C. Vincent	Commander of the Ceylon Volunteers Force	24 August 1907	24 January 1913	
	Alfred George Lascelles	Attorney General	24 August 1907	1911	Replaced by Anton Bertram
	Anton Bertram	Attorney General	18 May 1911	24 January 1913	
	Bernard Senior	Auditor General as Colonial Auditor	24 August 1907	8 April 1909	Replaced by D. S. MacGregor
	D. S. MacGregor	Auditor General as Colonial Auditor	8 April 1909	24 January 1913	
	Hilgrove Clement Nicolle	Treasurer	24 August 1907	1908	Replaced by Bernard Senior
	Bernard Senior	Treasurer	12 December 1908	24 January 1913	

== Chalmers executive council ==
Portrait	Member of Council	Office	Took office	Left office	Notes
	Robert Chalmers	Governor	18 October 1913	4 December 1915	
	Reginald Edward Stubbs	Colonial Secretary	1913	4 December 1915	
	Brigadier general R. B. Fell	Commander of the Ceylon Defence Force	18 October 1913	6 March 1914	
	Lieutenant colonel W. G. B. Dickson	Commander of the Ceylon Defence Force	6 March 1914	?	Acting
	Lieutenant colonel Edward James Hayward	Commander of the Ceylon Defence Force	7 October 1914	?	Acting, Honorary Lieutenant colonel
	Brigadier general R. B. Fell	Commander of the Ceylon Defence Force	?	4 December 1915	
	Anton Bertram	Attorney General	18 October 1913	4 December 1915	
	D. S. MacGregor	Auditor General as Colonial Auditor	18 October 1913	27 May 1914	
	Wilfrid Wentworth Woods	Auditor General as Colonial Auditor	27 May 1914	4 December 1915	
	Bernard Senior	Treasurer	18 October 1913	4 December 1915	

== John Anderson executive council ==
Portrait	Member of Council	Office	Took office	Left office	Notes
	John Anderson	Governor	15 April 1916	24 March 1918	
	Reginald Edward Stubbs	Colonial Secretary	15 April 1916	24 March 1918	
	Brigadier general R. B. Fell	Commander of the Ceylon Defence Force	15 April 1916	24 March 1918	
	Anton Bertram	Attorney General	15 April 1916	24 March 1918	
	Wilfrid Wentworth Woods	Auditor General as Colonial Auditor	15 April 1916	24 March 1918	
	Bernard Senior	Treasurer	15 April 1916	24 March 1918	

== Manning executive council ==
Portrait	Member of Council	Office	Took office	Left office	Notes
	William Manning	Governor	10 September 1918	1 April 1925	
	Reginald Edward Stubbs	Colonial Secretary	10 September 1918	1919	
	Cecil Clementi	Colonial Secretary	1922	1925	
	Brigadier general R. B. Fell	Commander of the Ceylon Defence Force	10 September 1918	31 December 1919	Replaced by Thomas Howard Chapman
	Lieutenant colonel Thomas Howard Chapman	Commander of the Ceylon Defence Force	1 January 1920	21 July 1920	Acting, Replaced by F. M. G. Rowley
	Brigadier general F. M. G. Rowley	Commander of the Ceylon Defence Force	22 July 1920	1 April 1925	
	Anton Bertram	Attorney General	10 September 1918	1918	Replaced by Henry Gollan
	Henry Gollan	Attorney General	15 October 1918	1924	Replaced by Lancelot Henry Elphinstone
	Lancelot Henry Elphinstone	Attorney General	6 October 1924	1 April 1925	
	Wilfrid Wentworth Woods	Auditor General as Colonial Auditor	10 September 1918	1 March 1922	Replaced by F. G. Morley
	F. G. Morley	Auditor General as Colonial Auditor	1 March 1922	1 April 1925	
	Bernard Senior	Treasurer	10 September 1918	1922	
	Wilfrid Wentworth Woods	Treasurer	22 February 1922		

== Clifford executive council ==
Portrait	Member of Council	Office	Took office	Left office	Notes
	Hugh Clifford	Governor	30 November 1925	June 1927	
	?	Colonial Secretary			
	Brigadier general F. M. G. Rowley	Commander of the Ceylon Defence Force	30 November 1925	8 February 1927	Replaced by Albion Earnest Andrews
	Colonel Albion Earnest Andrews	Commander of the Ceylon Defence Force	9 February 1927	June 1927	
	Lancelot Henry Elphinstone	Attorney General	30 November 1925	June 1927	
	F. G. Morley	Auditor General as Colonial Auditor	30 November 1925	June 1927	
	Wilfrid Wentworth Woods	Treasurer	30 November 1925	June 1927	

== Stanley executive council ==
Portrait	Member of Council	Office	Took office	Left office	Notes
	Herbert Stanley	Governor	20 August 1928	11 February 1931	
	?	Colonial Secretary	20 August 1928	1929	Replaced by Bernard Henry Bourdillon
	Bernard Henry Bourdillon	Colonial Secretary	1929	11 February 1931	
	Colonel Albion Earnest Andrews	Commander of the Ceylon Defence Force	20 August 1928	14 December 1928	
	Lieutenant colonel G. B. Stevens	Commander of the Ceylon Defence Force	14 December 1928	28 April 1929	Acting
	Lieutenant colonel Edward Bromfield Ferrers	Commander of the Ceylon Defence Force	29 April 1929	11 February 1931	
	Lancelot Henry Elphinstone	Attorney General	20 August 1928	1929	
	Edward St. John Jackson	Attorney General	12 May 1929	11 February 1931	
	F. G. Morley	Auditor General as Colonial Auditor	20 August 1928	11 February 1931	
	Wilfrid Wentworth Woods	Treasurer			

== Thomson executive council ==
Portrait	Member of Council	Office	Took office	Left office	Notes
	Graeme Thomson	Governor	11 April 1931	July 1931	
	Bernard Henry Bourdillon	Colonial Secretary	11 April 1931	July 1931	
	Colonel Edward Bromfield Ferrers	Commander of the Ceylon Defence Force	11 April 1931	July 1931	
	Edward St. John Jackson	Attorney General	11 April 1931	July 1931	
	F. G. Morley	Auditor General as Colonial Auditor	11 April 1931	25 June 1931	Replaced by Oliver Ernest Goonetilleke
	Oliver Ernest Goonetilleke	Auditor General as Colonial Auditor	25 June 1931	July 1931	
	Wilfrid Wentworth Woods	Treasurer			

== Dissolution ==
With enactment of the new constitution of the Dominion of Ceylon in 1947 the Board of Ministers was replaced by a National Cabinet.

== See also ==
- Cabinet of Sri Lanka
- List of Sri Lankan cabinets
