= Kanatte Cemetery =

Burial ground in Colombo, Sri Lanka

Kanatte Cemetery Borella Cemetery
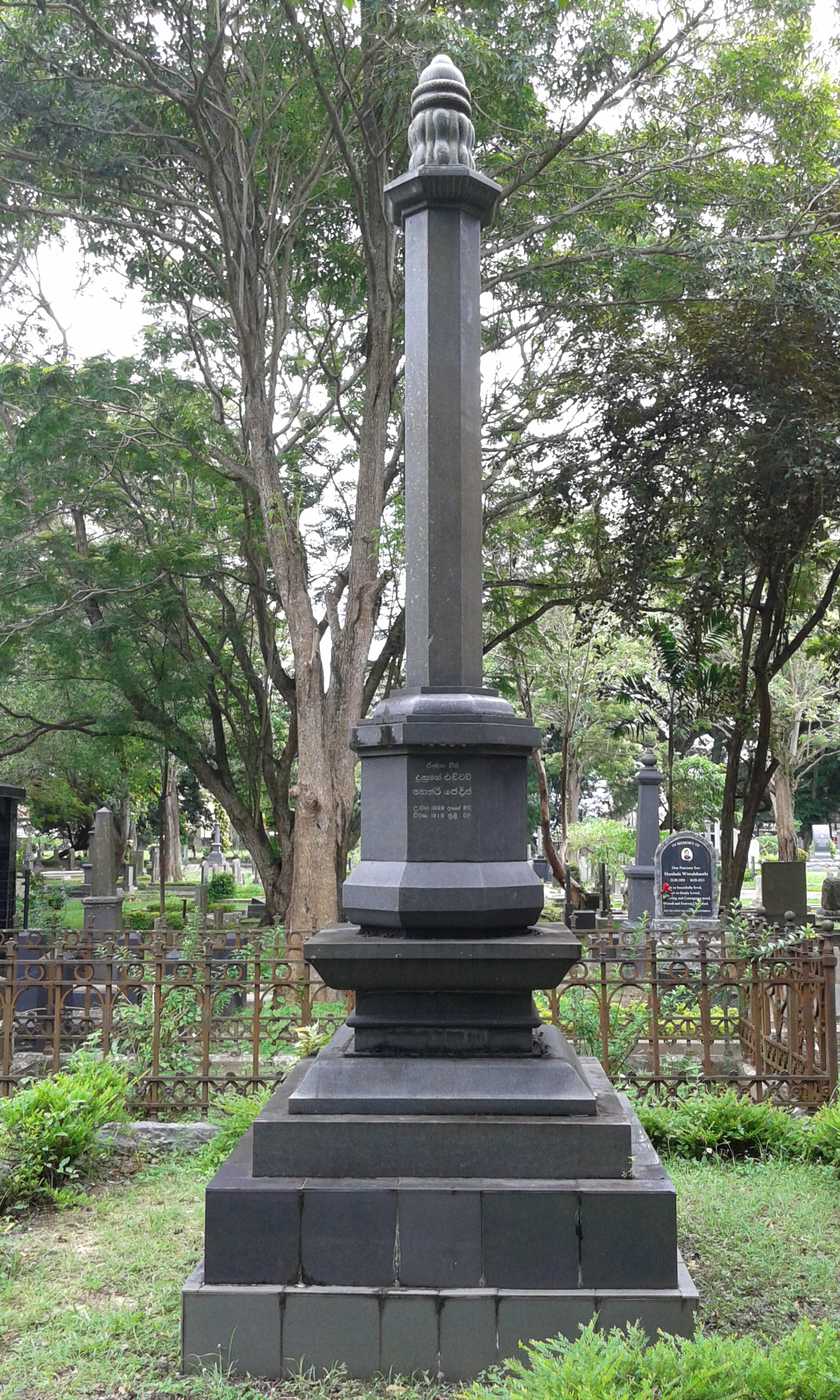
- Captain Henry Pedris' tomb at Kanatte Cemetery
- Interactive map of Kanatte Cemetery; Borella Cemetery

Details
- Established: 1866; 160 years ago
- Location: 509 Bauddhaloka Mawatha, Borella, Colombo
- Country: Sri Lanka
- Coordinates: 6.90794°N 79.87748°E
- Type: British military of WWI (closed); British military of WWII (closed); General (open)
- Owned by: Colombo Municipal Council
- Size: 19.3 ha (48 acres)
- No. of graves: 120,000+ (363 war graves)
- Find a Grave: Kanatte Cemetery; Borella Cemetery

Kanatte Cemetery, also known locally as Borella Cemetery, is the main burial ground and crematorium in Colombo, Sri Lanka.

It is located at the intersection of Elvitigala Mawatha (Narahenpita Road), Bauddhaloka Mawatha (Bullers Road) and D. S. Senanayake Mawatha (Baseline Road).

The 19.3 ha (48 acres) cemetery is owned and operated by the Colombo Municipal Council and contains a Commonwealth War Graves Plot with a number of additional war graves dispersed around the site. The war graves include those of a German soldier, a German merchant seaman, a German interned civilian and an Austrian nursing sister. Over 60 World War I Commonwealth servicemen and nearly 300 World War II Commonwealth servicemen are buried here.

The cemetery was established in 1866 and is the main place of burial for all religions and nationalities, with separate sections for Hindus, Buddhists, Shintos, Roman Catholics, Anglicans and non-denominational Christians. The first burial took place in May 1866, prior to this most British burials occurred at the Galle Face Burial Grounds, an area near the current Presidential Secretariat building. In the 1920s, those graves were exhumed and the remains interred at Kanatte.

The most famous Westerner interred at the cemetery is the British-born science fiction writer Sir Arthur C. Clarke (1917–2008).

== See also ==
- British Garrison Cemetery
- Kandy War Cemetery
- Liveramentu Cemetery
- Trincomalee British War Cemetery
