= Henry Marshall =

Henry Marshall or Marshal may refer to:

== Politics ==
- Henry Augustus Marshall (1770s–1841), British colonial administrator in British Ceylon
- Henry Marshall (Louisiana politician) (1805–1864), American Confederate politician
- Henry Marshall (New York politician) (1847–1938), American lawyer and politician from New York
- Henry W. Marshall (1865–1951), publisher and politician in Indiana
- Henry Marshall (MP) (1688–1754), British merchant and politician

== Religion ==
- Henry Marshal (bishop of Exeter) (1150–1206), medieval Catholic bishop in England
- Henry Marshall (bishop of Salford) (1884–1955), modern Roman Catholic bishop in England

== Sports ==
- Henry Marshall (American football) (born 1954), American football player
- Henry Marshall (footballer) (1872–1936), Scottish footballer (Celtic FC and Scotland)
- Henry Marshall (cricketer, born 1820) (1820–1894), English cricketer and clergyman
- Henry Marshall (cricketer, born 1831) (1831–1914), English cricketer
- Henry Marshal (cricketer) (1900–1970), cricketer for Argentina

== Other ==
- Henry Marshall (physician) (1775–1851), medical pioneer
- Henry Rutgers Marshall (1852–1927), American architect and psychologist

== See also ==
- Harry Marshall (disambiguation)
