= John Caulfield (civil servant) =

James Caulfield

10th Treasurer of Ceylon
- In office 23 October 1854 – 30 June 1860
- Preceded by: Francis Templer
- Succeeded by: Frederick Saunders

Personal details
- Born: James Caulfield; 19 July 1806 Skibbereen, County Cork, Ireland
- Died: 4 May 1861 (aged 54) Kandy, Ceylon
- Resting place: British Garrison Cemetery, Kandy
- Spouse: Eliza née Gray
- Children: 5
- Parent(s): Hans Caulfield (father); Anne née Rothe (mother)
- Profession: Colonial administrator

James Caulfield (19 July 1806 - 4 May 1861) was a British civil servant, who served as the tenth Treasurer of Ceylon from 1854 to 1860. He was a member of the George William Anderson executive council of Ceylon and the Torrington executive council of Ceylon.

== Early life and career ==
Caulfield was born on 19 July 1806 in Skibbereen, County Cork, Ireland, the second son of Reverend Hans Caulfield (1778 - 1851), rector of Kilmanagh, and Anne née Rothe (1783 - 1852). His older brother, Charles (1804 – 1862) was the Bishop of Nassau and the Bahamas (1861–1862). He began his career as a midshipman on one of the East India Company's ships, before being appointed to the Ceylon Civil Service on 12 October 1823. He served as an assistant in the Cinnamon Department (1823), the assistant to the government agent for the Southern Province, assistant to the government agent of the Western Province (1841), District judge of Chilaw and Putlam (1841), government agent for North Western Province (1845), District judge of Manar (1845), acting Auditor General (1850) and acting Treasurer (1850).

He married Eliza Gray (1815 - 1854), the daughter of Captain French Gray (1779 - 1818) and Ursula Theodora Petronella née Mooyart (1874 - 1847), the widower of Major Samuel Adolphus Rehe (? - 1837), on 17 October 1840 in Chilaw, Ceylon. They had five children together, three boys and two girls.

Following the death of Francis Templer on 22 October 1854, Caulfield took up the role as Treasurer of Ceylon, Deputy Paymaster General to the Queen's Troops and Commissioner of Stamps, on 23 October 1854, which was confirmed in January 1855. It was a position he served in for almost six years until he resigned on 30 June 1860.

He died in Kandy on 4 May 1861, of a long-standing heart disease, and is buried in the British Garrison Cemetery, Kandy.

Government offices
Preceded by Francis Templer	Treasurer of Ceylon; 1861–1865	Succeeded by Frederick Saunders
