= Hardinge Hay Cameron =

Hardinge Hay Cameron JP
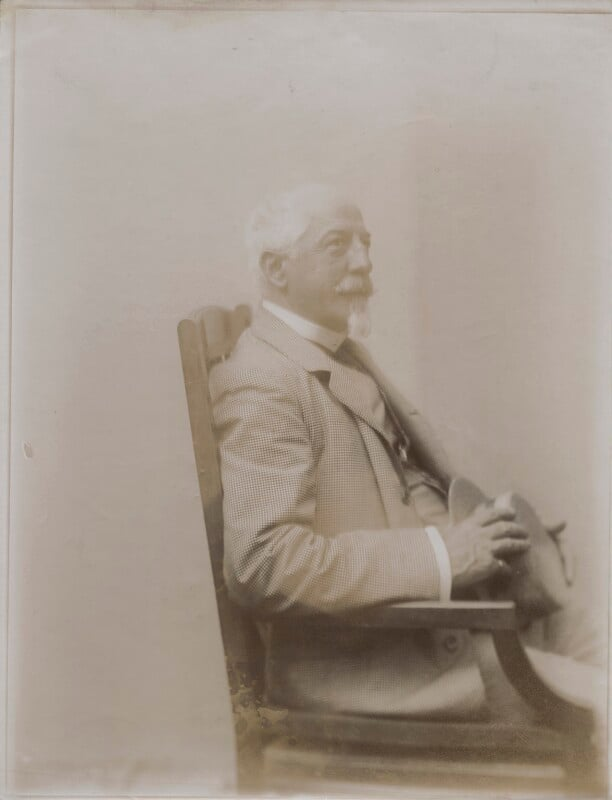
- Cameron, 1900–1911

19th Treasurer of Ceylon
- In office 11 June 1901 – 1904
- Preceded by: Charles Edward Ducat Pennycuick
- Succeeded by: Hilgrove Clement Nicolle

Personal details
- Born: Hardinge Hay Cameron; 5 August 1846 Calcutta, Bengal, India
- Died: 16 September 1911 (aged 65) Oxford, Oxfordshire, England
- Spouse(s): Katherine Anne Mackintosh McLeod (m. 1879; died 1880) Adeline Annie Blake (m. 1884)
- Profession: Colonial administrator

Hardinge Hay Cameron CCS, JP, FRCI (5 August 1846 – 16 September 1911) was the nineteenth Treasurer of Ceylon (1901–1904), and a member of both the Legislative Council and Governor's Executive Council, under the Ridgeway, and Blake administrations. He also served as the Mayor/Chairman of the Colombo Municipal Council (1887–1893).

== Early life and schooling ==
Hardinge Hay Cameron was born on 5 August 1846 in Chowringhee, Calcutta, Bengal Province, India, the third son and fourth child of Charles Hay Cameron, British jurist, and Julia Margaret née Pattle, British photographer. He was baptised at Fort William, Bengal, on 26 August 1846.

He studied at the Charterhouse School, matriculating on 14 October 1865, at the age of nineteen. He then enrolled at University College, Oxford.

== Career ==
In 1868 he joined the Ceylon Civil Service as a writer, and was appointed as Commissioner of Requests at Haputale. The following year he served as the acting assistant government agent in Kandy, which was confirmed in April 1872. In November he was transferred as acting government agent in Nuwara Eliya. He served as the private secretary to Sir William Henry Gregory, Governor of Ceylon, from 1872 to 1877. He was then appointed acting government agent in Nuwara Eliya in 1879, acting government agent in Badulla in 1881 and in 1886 the acting government agent for the Western Province.

Between 1887 and 1901 he served as the Mayor/Chairman of the Colombo Municipal Council.

On 11 June 1901 Cameron was appointed as Treasurer of Ceylon and Commissioner of Stamps. When he retired as Treasurer in 1904 he returned to England to complete his university studies, which he did so in 1908.

== Personal life ==
Cameron married Katherine Anne Mackintosh Macleod (1858-1880), daughter of Rev. Norman Macleod and Catherine Anne née Mackintosh, on 20 September 1879 in Colombo, Ceylon. She died just over a year later on 27 December 1880 in Nuwara Eliya, Ceylon.

Cameron married Adeline Annie Blake (1862-1947), daughter of Colonel George Pilkington Blake and Adeline née King, on 2 December 1884 in St George Hanover Square, London, England. They had no children.

Cameron died on 16 September 1911, in Oxford, Oxfordshire, England aged 65. He is buried in the city's cemetery.

== See also ==
- Cameron, Julia Margaret, Cameron, C. H., Cameron, Hardinge Hay, Cameron, Kitty Macleod, Cameron, Adeline A. Blake, Herschel, John F. W., and Taylor, Henry. Julia Margaret Cameron Family Papers, Ca. 1800-1940. (1800).

Government offices
Preceded by Charles Edward Ducat Pennycuick	Treasurer of Ceylon; 1901–1904	Succeeded by Hilgrove Clement Nicolle
