= Frederick Saunders (civil servant) =

Civil servant under the Robinson administration

Frederick Saunders JP

11th Treasurer of Ceylon
- In office 1861–1865
- Preceded by: John Caulfield
- Succeeded by: George Vane

Personal details
- Born: c.1804
- Died: 29 September 1870 Guildford, Surrey, England
- Resting place: St. John the Baptist Church, Puttenham, Surrey
- Spouse: Louisa Matilda Tucker
- Children: Elizabeth Mary, Frederick Richard
- Profession: Colonial administrator

Frederick Saunders, CCS, JP, (c.1804 - 29 September 1870) was the acting Postmaster General of Ceylon (1839), the eleventh Treasurer of Ceylon (1861–1865), and a member of both the Legislative Council and Governor's Executive Council, under the Robinson administration.

== Career ==
Saunders initially worked in the Custom's office in Liverpool in February 1823, before taking on the role of warehouse keeper, in Halifax, Nova Scotia in September 1825. In February 1828 he went on to being the controller of customs at Saint Andrews, New Brunswick, followed by a position in March 1833 of collector of customs at St. George's, Bermuda.

In August 1836 he travelled to British Ceylon to take on the role of controller of customs. On 1 February 1839 he was appointed the acting Postmaster General of Ceylon.

In 1841 he was appointed acting collector of customs and acting warehouse keeper.

In 1842 he reverted to the office of controller of customs.

Saunders served as principal collector of customs from 1849 until 1961, and also served on the Legislative Council from 1850.

On 5 May 1861 Saunders was officially appointed as the Treasurer of Ceylon, deputy paymaster general to the Queen's Troops and Commissioner of Stamps, and served on the Executive Council of Ceylon, led by Governor Charles Justin MacCarthy, and the subsequent Executive Council led by Governor Hercules Robinson, until he resigned from the position in August 1865.

== Family ==
Saunders married Louisa Matilda Tucker (1814–1895). They had two children Elizabeth Mary (1837-1914) and Sir Frederick Richard KCMG (1838–1910), who also served as Treasurer of Ceylon and Commissioner of Stamps (1890–1897).

Saunders died on 29 September 1870 in Guildford, Surrey, England, at the age of 66.

Government offices
Preceded by John Caulfield	Treasurer of Ceylon; 1861–1865	Succeeded by George Vane
