= Frederick Richard Saunders =

Sir Frederick Richard Saunders KCMG
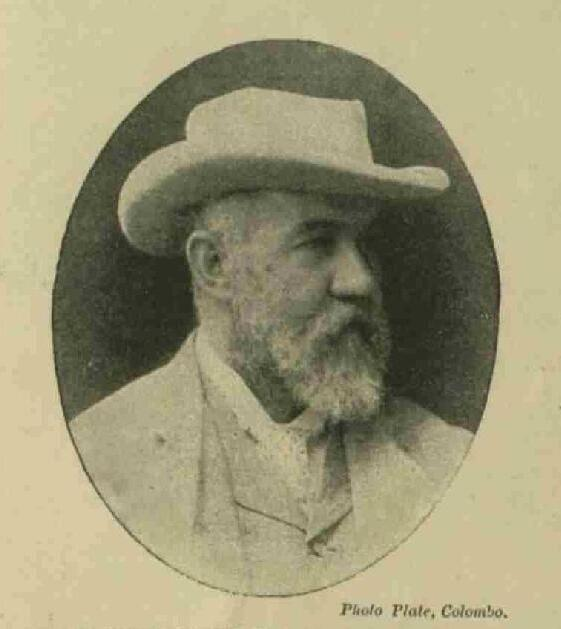

Treasurer of Ceylon
- In office 18 October 1890 – 1897
- Preceded by: George Thomas Michael O'Brien
- Succeeded by: Lionel Frederick Lee

2nd Inspector General of Police (Sri Lanka)
- In office 1872–1873
- Preceded by: William Robert Campbell
- Succeeded by: William Robert Campbell

Personal details
- Born: 7 July 1838 Colombo, British Ceylon (now Sri Lanka)
- Died: 30 March 1910 (aged 71) Hove, East Sussex
- Resting place: Leamington Spa, Warwickshire
- Spouse(s): Mary Jane née Gibson; 1837 (m. 1867; died 1895) Christina Sophia née Freshfield; 1837 (m. 1900; died 1909)
- Children: Louisa Caroline (b. 1868), Frederick William (b. 1870), Maud Mary (b. 1871), Neva Mary (b. 1872), Charles Reeves (b. 1876), Reginald Gibson (b. 1878).
- Parent(s): Frederick Saunders, Louisa Matilda née Tucker
- Profession: Colonial administrator

Sir Frederick Richard Saunders KCMG (7 July 1838 – 30 March 1910) was the Treasurer of Ceylon (now Sri Lanka) (1890–1897), Commissioner of Stamps, a member of the Executive and Legislative Councils, and the second British colonial Inspector General of Police of British Ceylon from 1872 to 1873.

== Early life ==
Frederick Richard Saunders was born in Colombo, Ceylon, on 7 July 1838, the first son and second child of Frederick Saunders (1804–1870) and Louisa Matilda née Tucker (1814–1895).

His father was the acting postmaster general of Ceylon (1839), the eleventh treasurer of Ceylon (1861–1865), and a member of both the Legislative Council and Governor's Executive Council, under the Robinson administration.

He was educated at the Royal College of Elizabeth, Guernsey, and the Royal Military Academy, Woolwich.

== Career ==
He entered the Ceylon Civil Service in 1857, and amongst the posts he held were those of assistant government agent, district judge, inspector-general of prisons, and government agent for the Western Province.

While Assistant Government Agent in In 1864, Sir Frederick supervised and personally carried out the capture of the noted brigand Utuwankande Sura Saradiel, a Ceylonese gang leader and bandit described as the 'Robin Hood of Sri Lanka', who was sentenced to death and hanged on 7 May 1864.

Sir Frederick organised elephant kraals on the occasion of the visits of the Duke of Edinburgh, Prince Alfred, the Earl of Clarence, Prince Leopold, and the Duke of York who would later become King George, V of the United Kingdom and Emperor of India, to Ceylon.

In 1886, he represented Ceylon at the Royal Colonial Exhibition in London and in 1897 was the principal representative of Ceylon at the Diamond Jubilee Commemoration Celebrations in London, and presented the Ceylon address to Queen Victoria at Windsor.

He was appointed Treasurer of Ceylon and Commissioner of Stamps in 1890. He received the CMG in 1880 and was appointed Knight Commander of the Order of St Michael and St George on 22 June 1897, retiring from public service in 1897.

It was greatly due to his efforts whilst Chairman of the Northern Railway Commissions that the northern line railway to Jaffna was sanctioned, constructed, and opened in 1894.

== Personal life ==
Sir Frederick married Mary Jane née Gibson, daughter of William Charles Gibson (CMG); a fellow senior Ceylonese Civil Servant, on 26 October 1867. By his wife Mary he had issue:

- Louisa Caroline (b. 1868).
- Frederick William (b. 1870) of the Royal Engineers and Queen Victoria's Own Sappers and Miners. He was commissioned 2nd lieutenant in 1888, became lieutenant 1891, captain in 1899, and was promoted to major in 1907. He was posted in Aden in 1914 and promoted to the rank of lieutenant-colonel before being sent to Bombay in 1917. From there, he was sent to Quetta, where he fought with the 4th (Quetta) Division during the Third Anglo-Afghan War where he was brought to notice for his distinguished service during operations against Afghanistan by Sir Charles Monro, 1st Baronet. Frederick died on 4 May 1933, aged 63, at 8 Knaresborough Place, South Kensington. He left his substantial estate to his brother Reginald and sister Louisa, who remained unmarried.
- Maud Mary (b. 1871); married Colonel George Dalrymple Fanshawe of the Royal Artillery, nephew of Admiral, Sir Edward Gennys Fanshawe and grandson of Sir George Judd Harding.
- Neva Mary (b. 1872); married Captain Robert Bruce Cameron, son of John Macdonald Cameron and like G. D. Fanshawe, of the Royal Artillery.
- Reginald Gibson (b. 1878); educated in England at Tonbridge School and Cheltenham College. He entered the Ceylon Government Service and held various minor appointments, such as third assistant to the postmaster-general, acting assistant collector of customs and police magistrate, Trincomalee, and office assistant to the government agent, Uva Province. In 1903 he became police magistrate at Matara, and in 1904 assistant government agent and district judge at Mannar. He attended the two pearl fisheries of 1904 and 1905 in his official capacity. In 1906, on his return from half-pay leave, he was appointed commissioner of requests and police magistrate, Chilaw. Later he was made assistant government agent and district judge, Chilaw.

Mary died on 30 April 1895, and in the year 1900, Sir Frederick married, secondly, Christina Sophia (née Freshfield), daughter of Charles Freshfield (MP for Dover); son of James William Freshfield - the man who founded the (now) international law firm Freshfields. Christina died on 15 January 1909.

== Death ==
Saunders died on 30 March 1910 at The Drive, Hove, East Sussex at the age of 71. Saunders' body was then brought by train to Leamington Spa, accompanied by members of his family, and interred at Leamington Cemetery, where he was buried in the grave of his first wife, Mary. The Cingalese flag was used as a pall and the funeral service was conducted by Rev. W. A. Buck, who - when in Ceylon - was acquainted with Sir Frederick.

Government offices
Preceded by George Thomas Michael O'Brien	Treasurer of Ceylon; 1890–1897	Succeeded by Lionel Frederick Lee
Police appointments
Preceded by William Robert Campbell	Inspector General of Police; 1872–1873	Succeeded by William Robert Campbell
