= Anderson executive council =

Anderson executive council may refer to:

- Anderson executive council of Bengal
- George William Anderson executive council of Ceylon
- John Anderson executive council of Ceylon
