= Philip Anstruther (colonial secretary) =

4th Colonial Secretary of Ceylon
- In office 1 May 1833 – 1845
- Monarch: Queen Victoria
- Preceded by: John Rodney
- Succeeded by: James Emerson Tennent

Personal details
- Born: 25 May 1802 Elie, Fife, Scotland
- Died: 22 May 1863 (aged 60) London, England
- Resting place: Saint Cuthbert's Churchyard, Edinburgh, Scotland
- Citizenship: British
- Spouse: Mary Frances Stewart Mackenzie
- Relations: Robert Anstruther (father), Anne née Nairne (mother)
- Children: 11
- Profession: civil servant, planter
- Committees: Executive Council of Ceylon

Phillip Anstruther (born 25 May 1802 - 22 May 1863) was a British public servant, coffee planter and served as the fourth Colonial Secretary of Ceylon (1833-1845).

Phillip Anstruther was born 25 May 1802 at Elie, Fife, Scotland, the oldest of three children to Colonel Robert Anstruther, the member for Anstruther Burghs (1793-1794) and Anne née Nairne. His grandfather was Sir John Anstruther, the baronet of Nova Scotia.

On 18 December 1819, at the age of seventeen, he joined the Ceylon Civil Service beginning as extra assistant to the Colonial Secretary and was subsequently appointed Collector of Colombo. On 1 October 1833 he was appointed as Colonial Secretary of Ceylon, taking up a position on the Executive Council of Ceylon on 7 November 1837. On numerous occasions he was called upon to take on the role of acting Governor of Ceylon. From 1840 onwards, Anstruther purchased 1,535 hectares (3,793 acres) of crown land in the high lands around Kandy, on which he established a number of coffee plantations.

He married Mary Frances Stewart Mackenzie (1819-1913), daughter of James Alexander Stewart-Mackenzie, the Governor of Ceylon (1837-1941), on 27 July 1838 in Scotland. They had eleven children: Mary Helen (b. 1839); Robert Durham (b. 1841); Annie Nairn (b. 1843); Jemima Stewart (b. 1845); Philip Morrison (b. 1846); Stewart (b. 1848); John Newdegate (b. 1850); Caroline Petre (b. 1928); Keith Francis George (b. 1854); Henry Lewis (b. 1856); and Charles William (b. 1858).

In October 1838 he went on extended leave and was in London for two years and four months, during which time he advised the Colonial Office. His assessment of the state of affairs in Ceylon, resulted in the Secretary of State for the Colonies, Lord John Russell, reviewing a number of the recommendations of the Colebrooke–Cameron Commission. He retired from the Ceylon Civil Service in 1845.

In 1845 he was the inaugural chairman of the Ceylon Railway Company, which was established to construct and operate the colony's first railway. In 1849 he was called to present evidence to a Parliamentary Select Committee on sugar and coffee planting, where he was heavily critical of the administration of Governor Torrington.

He died on 22 May 1863 (at the age of 60) in London, England. He is buried in Saint Cuthbert's Churchyard, Edinburgh, Scotland.
