= HMS Vengeance =

Eight ships of the Royal Navy have been named HMS Vengeance.

- HMS Vengeance (1758) was a 28-gun sixth rate captured from the French in 1758 and sunk as a breakwater in 1766.
- HMS Vengeance (1774) was a 74-gun third rate launched in 1774. She became a prison ship in 1808 and was broken up in 1816.
- HMS Vengeance (1793) was a Dutch galliot, possibly the Lady Augusta, purchased in 1793 and sold in 1804.
- HMS Vengeance (1800) was a 38-gun fifth rate captured from the French in 1800; accounts differ as to whether she was broken up in 1803 after grounding in 1801, or continued as a prison ship until 1814.
- HMS Vengeance (1824) was an 84-gun second rate launched in 1824. She became a receiving ship in 1861 and was sold in 1897.
- HMS Vengeance (1899) was a Canopus-class battleship launched in 1899 and sold in 1921.
- HMS Vengeance (R71) was a Colossus-class aircraft carrier launched in 1944. She served with the Royal Australian Navy from 1952 to 1954, and was sold to Brazil in 1956 and renamed Minas Gerais.
- HMS Vengeance (S31) is a Vanguard-class nuclear ballistic missile submarine launched in 1998 and in active service.

== Other British military vessels named Vengeance ==
- Vengeance was a gunboat that the garrison at Gibraltar launched in June 1782 during the Great Siege of Gibraltar. She was one of 12. Each was armed with an 18-pounder gun, and received a crew of 21 men drawn from Royal Navy vessels stationed at Gibraltar. Speedwell provided Vengeance's crew.

== Battle honours ==
Five battle honours have been awarded to ships named HMS Vengeance.

- Quiberon Bay 1759
- Martinique 1794
- St Lucia 1796
- Crimea 1854
- Dardanelles 1915
