= Augustus Hill (British Army officer) =

Brigadier-General Augustus Hill CB
- Born: 4 May 1853; Isle of Wight
- Died: 2 January 1921 (aged 67)
- Military career
- Allegiance: United Kingdom
- Branch: British Army
- Service years: 1873 to 1909
- Rank: Brigadier-General
- Commands: 2nd Bn, the Middlesex Regiment; Welsh Division
- Conflicts: Second Boer War; Spion Kop
- Awards: Companion of the Order of the Bath

Brigadier-General Augustus West Hill, CB (4 May 1853 – 2 January 1921) was a British Army officer.

== Military career ==
Hill was commissioned into the 57th (West Middlesex) Regiment of Foot on 1 January 1873. Following the 1881 Childers Reforms, the 57th merged with the 77th (East Middlesex), and became 2nd Battalion, the Middlesex Regiment; Hill commanded the battalion at the Battle of Spion Kop in January 1900, during the Second Boer War. He was subsequently mentioned in dispatches and appointed a Companion of the Order of the Bath for this action.

He became the first general officer commanding (GOC) of the Welsh Division, part of the newly created Territorial Force (TF), on 1 April 1908, shortly before retiring from the army in January 1909. He lived at Beckington Castle in Somerset from 1896 until 1901.

== Family ==
He married Alice Emma Vane, daughter of George Vane, Treasurer of Ceylon (1865–1882), and they had at least two sons, both of whom also became soldiers. Herbert (1881–1943), served in South Africa with his father, followed by the British Indian Army, and Gerald (1887-1958), who joined the Royal Irish Fusiliers, and won a DSO in 1918.

== Sources ==
- "Herbert Augustus Hill". Anglo-Boer War. 2 July 2019.
- Lock, Ron (2011). Hill of Squandered Valour: The Battle for Spion Kop, 1900. Casemate. ISBN 978-1612000077.

Military offices
New title	GOC Welsh Division; 1908–1909	Succeeded by Francis Lloyd
