= Charles Irving =

Charles Irving may refer to:

- Charles Irving (politician), British member of parliament for Cheltenham
- Charles Irving (surgeon), British surgeon and inventor
- Charles John Irving, British civil servant in the Malay Peninsula
