= Galle Face Burial Ground =

Former cemetery in Colombo, Sri Lanka

Details
- Established: 1803
- Closed: c. 1920
- Location: Southern bank of Beira Lake, north of Galle Face Green, Colombo, Ceylon
- Country: Ceylon
- Type: British nationals

Galle Face Burial Ground (also known as the Garrison Cemetery) was a former cemetery located in Colombo, Ceylon. It was established in 1803 by the British administration in response to the lack of burial sites for British nationals who died in Ceylon, and was used for burials until 1877. In the 1920s, when the site was redeveloped, the graves were relocated to Kanatte Cemetery, the main burial ground and crematorium in Colombo.

== History ==
The Galle Face Burial Ground was established by the British in 1803 largely due to the heavy casualties suffered by the British army in the Kandyan War against the King of Kandy during the administration of Governor Frederick North (1801–1805).

Situated on enclosed ground on the southern bank of Beira Lake, north of Galle Face Green, the burial site was used exclusively for the British, including military personnel, government offices, merchants, planters, and their wives and children. In 1821, the burial ground was consecrated by the Bishop of Calcutta, Thomas Middleton. During the 1830s and 1840s, it was referred to as 'Padre Bailey's Godown' after Archdeacon Bailey of Colombo who officiated at burials.

When Kanatte Cemetery was opened in Colombo in 1866, burials at Gale Face Burial Ground declined with the last recorded grave dating from 1877. The cemetery was closed after the First World War pending the redevelopment of the site, and the graves were exhumed and the remains interred at Kanatte Cemetery.

== Notable burials ==
- Richard Pennefather (d. 1865), Auditor-General of Ceylon.
- William Ogle Carr (d.1856), Chief Justice of Ceylon.
- Henry Augustus Marshall (d. 1841), Auditor-General of Ceylon.
