= Edward Noel =

Edward Noel may refer to:

- Edward Noel, 1st Earl of Gainsborough (1641–1689), British peer and member of the House of Lords
- Edward Noel, 2nd Viscount Campden, member of parliament for Rutland
- Edward Noel (Indian Army officer) (1886–1974), British officer, diplomat and spy
- Edward Noel, 1st Viscount Wentworth (1715–1774)

== See also ==
- Edward Noël Walker, governor of British Ceylon
