= Liveramentu Cemetery =

Municipal and war grave cemetery in Colombo, Sri Lanka

- Interactive map of Liveramentu Cemetery

Details
- Established: Mid 16th Century
- Location: Colombo
- Country: Sri Lanka
- Coordinates: 6.89660°N 79.86901°E
- Type: British military of WWI (closed); British military of WWII (closed)
- Owned by: Colombo Municipal Council/Department of National Botanical Gardens
- Size: 5.1 ha (13 acres)
- No. of graves: 1,123 (610 war graves)
- Find a Grave: Liveramentu Cemetery

Liveramentu Cemetery, also locally known as Jawatta Cemetery or the Torrington Cemetery, is a large municipal cemetery, located approximately 1.5 km (0.93 mi) from the Colombo city centre, on Torrington Avenue. It is also the largest Commonwealth war cemetery in Sri Lanka.

It is one of the six Commonwealth war cemeteries in Sri Lanka, and is maintained by the Department of National Botanical Gardens, with funding from the Commonwealth War Graves Commission.

The entrance to the cemetery incorporates a memorial wall, commemorating 346 Commonwealth servicemen and one Dutch serviceman who died while serving in Ceylon during the Second World War (1939–1945), whose graves/bodies could not be found. The cemetery also contains the Liveramentu Cremation Memorial which commemorates 165 Hindu servicemen who died while serving in Ceylon, and who were accorded the last rite required by their religion – committal to fire. The memorial is in the form of a stone pylon crowned with a stone urn, with wing walls inscribed with the servicemen's names. The cemetery also has a memorial commemorating 28 Italian prisoners of war who died and were buried in the country between 1939 and 1945.

The cemetery is situated on the site of a Portuguese church, Chapel of Nossa Senhora do Livramento, dedicated to the Virgin Mary, the Virgin of Good Deliverance, from which it derives its name. The church was a well known Marian shrine, with a well whose waters were alleged to perform miracles. The church was subsequently destroyed by the Dutch. The site was declared a protected archaeological site on 8 July 2005.

== See also ==
- British Garrison Cemetery
- Kanatte Cemetery
- Kandy War Cemetery
- Trincomalee British War Cemetery
