= Trincomalee British War Cemetery =

Commonwealth War Graves Commission cemetery in Sri Lanka

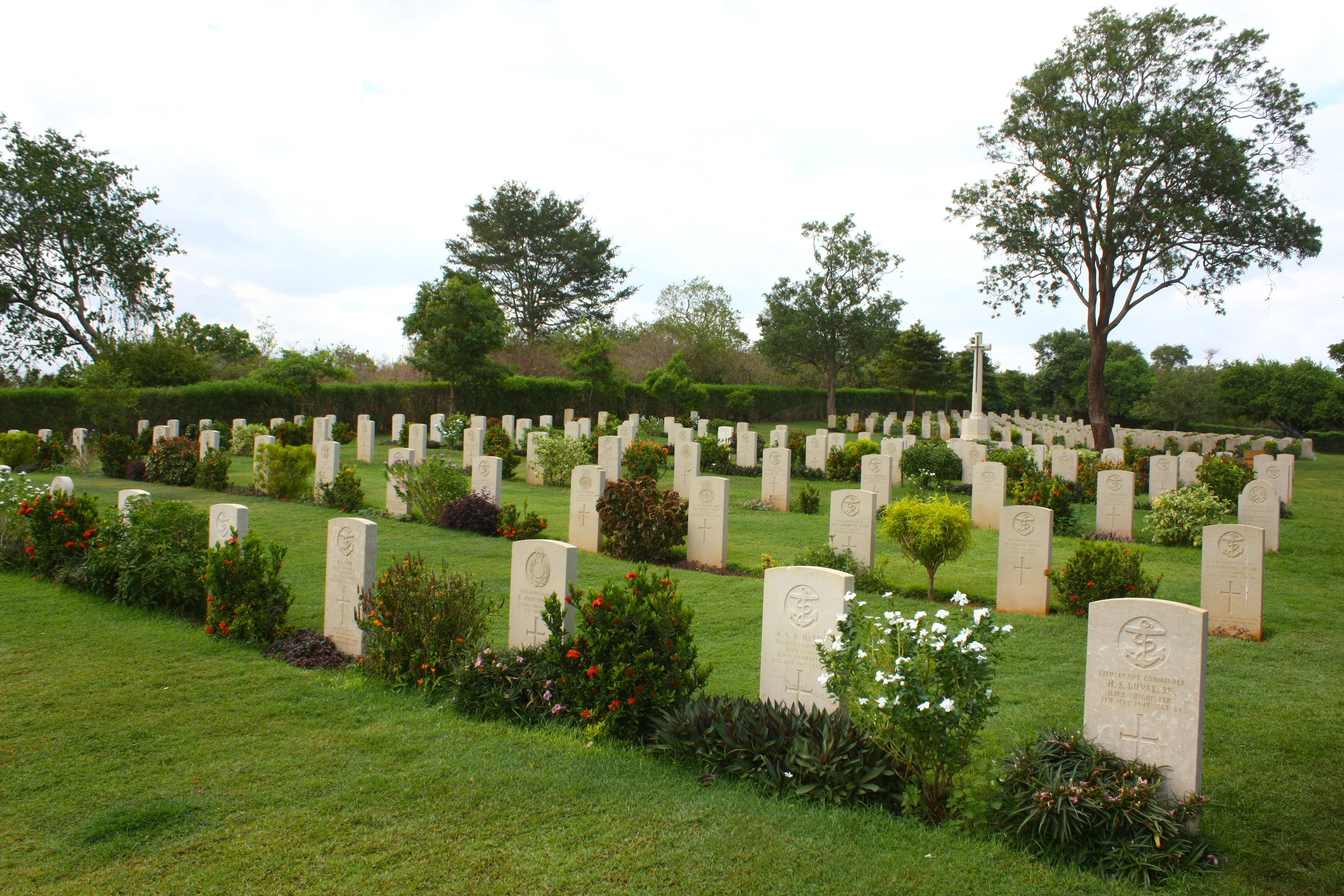
- Trincomalee British War Cemetery
- Interactive map of Trincomalee British War Cemetery

Details
- Established: April 1948
- Location: Trincomalee
- Country: Sri Lanka
- Coordinates: 8.6156°N 81.2137°E
- Type: British military of WWII (closed)
- Owned by: Commonwealth War Graves Commission
- No. of graves: 303
- Find a Grave: Trincomalee British War Cemetery

Trincomalee British War Cemetery (also known as Trincomalee War Cemetery) is a British military cemetery in Trincomalee, Sri Lanka, for soldiers of the British Empire who were killed or died during World War II. The cemetery also has graves of Dutch, French, Italian and other allied forces. The cemetery is located on Trincomalee–Nilaveli (A6) Road, approximately 6 kilometres (3.7 mi) north of the town of Trincomalee, on the eastern side. It is one of the six Commonwealth war cemeteries in Sri Lanka, and maintained by Sri Lankan Ministry of Defense on behalf of the Commonwealth War Graves Commission. A notable interment is Lieutenant Commander Richard John Cork, a flying ace of the Fleet Air Arm.

Here is the list of some headstones:

- Warrant Officer D.J. Bennett, a Royal Air Force pilot, age 23
- Lance Corporal D.V. Jones, a Royal Marine engineer
- Sergeant A.C. Cherry, a Royal Marine engineer, age 25
- Steward G.A. Juff, H.M.S. 'Erebus', age 40
- Able Seaman K.P. Andrews, H.M.S. 'Erebus', the 9th of April 1942, age 19
- Bugler E. Broad, R.M. H.M.S. 'Erebus', age 18
- Ordinary Seaman W.A. Dove, H.M.S. 'Erebus', age 20
- Ldg. Aircraftman J.H. Price-Stephens, Royal Air Force, age 19
- Air Mechanic R.A. Budden, H.M.S. 'Bambara', age 20
- Ordinary Seaman L.D. Williams, Royal N.Z. Navy, age 22
- Ldg. Aircraftman R.H.G. Chapple, Royal Air Force, age 28
- Ordinary Seaman L.D. Williams, Royal N.Z. Navy, the 10th of July 1945
- Able Seaman J.B.S. Cox, H.M.S. 'Wave', age 19
- Electrical Artificer J. Hodgson, Royal Navy, age 24
- Coder T.B. Woodhead, H.M.S. 'Highflyer', age 20

== See also ==
- British Garrison Cemetery
- Kandy War Cemetery
- Liveramentu Cemetery
