= Harry Marshall =

Harry Marshall may refer to:

- Harry Marshall (English footballer) (1905–1959)
- Harry Hatheway Marshall (1873–1950), American-born Canadian politician
- Harry Marshall (politician), Western Australian politician
- Harry Marshall (Scottish footballer) (1872–1936)

== See also ==
- Henry Marshall (disambiguation)
- Harold Marshall (disambiguation)
