= John Rodney (of Armsworth) =

English naval officer and administrator in Ceylon (1765–1847)

Captain John Rodney

3rd Colonial Secretary of Ceylon
- In office 3 Sep 1806 – 1833
- Monarchs: George III; George IV; William IV
- Preceded by: Robert Arbuthnot
- Succeeded by: Philip Anstruther

Member of Parliament for Launceston
- In office 1790–1795 Serving with Sir Henry Clinton; William Garthshore
- Preceded by: Charles Perceval
- Succeeded by: John Theophilus Rawdon

Personal details
- Born: 10 May 1765
- Died: 9 April 1847 (aged 81) Boulogne, Hauts-de-Seine, Ile-de-France, France
- Party: Tory
- Spouse(s): Lady Catherine Nugent (m. 1784; died 1794) Louisa Martha Stratford (m. 1799; died 1814) Antoinette Reyne (m. 1815)
- Children: 19
- Parents: Admiral George Brydges Rodney (father); Henrietta Clies (mother)
- Relatives: George Rodney (half-brother)
- Education: Royal Naval Academy
- Military career
- Allegiance: United Kingdom
- Branch: Royal Navy
- Service years: 1778-1790
- Rank: Captain
- Units: HMS Sandwich; HMS Fowey; HMS Sibyl
- Commands: HMS Anson; HMS America
- Conflicts: American Revolutionary War; Battle of Cape St. Vincent; Battle of the Chesapeake; Battle of Saint Kitts; French Revolutionary Wars

Captain John Rodney (10 May 1765 – 9 April 1847) was a British naval officer, politician, serving as the member of parliament for Launceston (1790–1796) and public servant, serving as the third Colonial Secretary of Ceylon (1806–1833).

John Rodney was born on 10 May 1765 the third son of Admiral George Brydges Rodney, 1st Baron Rodney and the eldest son to his second wife, Henrietta née Clies, the daughter of John Clies, a Portuguese businessman.

== Naval career ==
On 18 May 1778 he commenced studies at the Royal Naval Academy at Portsmouth but was discharged on 28 October 1779, joining his father's flagship, HMS Sandwich, as a midshipman. On 16 January 1780 he commanded a cannon at the Battle of Cape St. Vincent and was commissioned a lieutenant on 10 September that year. On 14 October, at the age on fifteen, his father gave him the command of a recently captured Virginian privateer, Pocahontas, and on the same day posted him on HMS Fowey. In April 1781 he joined HMS Sibyl, where he participated at the Battle of the Chesapeake on 5 September 1781. Rodney fought at the Battle of Saint Kitts on 26 January 1782. He was then appointed as the commander of HMS Anson, following the death of its captain at the Battle of the Saintes on 12 April 1782, returning with the ship to England.

As a favour from the Prince of Wales to his father Rodney was appointed as the member of parliament for Launceston serving between 1790 and 1796, although he rarely appeared in parliament. From 1789 to 1814 he was an equerry to Prince William, Duke of Clarence and St Andrews. On 30 April 1793, following the outbreak of the French Revolutionary Wars, he was given the command of HMS America, taking a convoy from Lisbon back to England in September 1794. On 12 February 1795 he was appointed to captain HMS Vengeance, but prior to sailing he broke his leg in a carriage accident resulting in it being amputated in August, following which he was invalided out of active service.

== Civil service ==
On 5 July 1796 Rodney was appointed the Commissioner of the Victualling Authority, remaining in the position until 4 November 1803. On 3 September 1806 he was appointed as the Chief Secretary of Ceylon holding the post until he resigned from the post in 1833. He was replaced with Philip Anstruther, who took up the role on 7 May 1834.

== Personal life ==
Rodney married Lady Catherine Nugent (1766–1794), daughter of the Thomas Nugent, 6th Earl of Westmeath, on 4 July 1784, with whom he had three daughters and two sons. His daughter Frances Mary, married Robert Stuart, 11th Lord Blantyre.

Following Catherine's death on 26 February 1794, he married Louisa Martha Stratford (1778–1814), daughter of John Stratford, 3rd Earl of Aldborough, on 19 October 1799, and they had two sons and six daughters. Louisa died on 2 December 1814 and he then married Antoinette Reyne in Ceylon on 7 June 1815, and they had a son and five daughters.

Rodney died on 9 April 1847 in Boulogne, Hauts-de-Seine, Ile-de-France, France.
