= Henry Wright (civil servant) =

11th Accountant General and Controller of Revenue
- In office 1 February 1841 – 28 May 1847
- Preceded by: Henry Augustus Marshall
- Succeeded by: Charles J. MacCarthy

Personal details
- Born: 6 July 1794 Stepney, London
- Died: 14 January 1879 (aged 84) London

Henry Wright (6 July 1794 – 14 January 1879) was the 11th Accountant General and Controller of Revenue of Ceylon.

He was born in London, the son of Henry Wright and his wife Elizabeth Dumaresq.

He was appointed Accountant General and Controller of Revenue of Ceylon on 1 February 1841, succeeding Henry Augustus Marshall, and held the office until 28 May 1847, when he was succeeded by Charles J. MacCarthy.

He had married Camilla Lowe (1812-1891), the daughter of Sir Hudson Lowe, and they had five children: Elizabeth Laura (b.1832); William Dumaresq (b.1833); Francis (b.1835); Clara (b.1836); and Albina Eleanor (b.1838) and three daughters, Elizabeth Laura (b.1832). His eldest son, William, became Treasurer of Ceylon in 1882.

Wright died on 14 January 1879.

Legal offices
Preceded by Henry Augustus Marshall	Accountant General and Controller of Revenue; 1841–1847	Succeeded by Charles J. MacCarthy
