= George Vane =

George Vane CMG

12th Treasurer of Ceylon
- In office 1865–1882
- Preceded by: Frederick Saunders
- Succeeded by: William Dumaresq Wright

Personal details
- Spouse: Harriet Braybrooke (m. 1847)
- Children: Frederick William, Henry George Bagnall
- Profession: Colonial administrator

George Vane CMG, CCS, was a British colonial administrator. He was the twelfth Treasurer of Ceylon (1865–1882), and a member of both the Legislative Council and Governor's Executive Council, under the Robinson, Gregory and Longden administrations.

== Career ==
Vane was initially appointed to the custom's department in Liverpool in 1834, before being appointed as inspector general of imports and exports in London in 1837, then landing waiter in 1839.

In 1847 he was made comptroller of customs in Jaffna, British Ceylon. In 1854 he was the deputy collector of customs in the western and north-western province of Ceylon.

Vane served as superintendent of fisheries from 1855 to 1860 and was primarily responsible for administering pearl fishing in the Gulf of Mannar, during that time. In 1887 a report he prepared on the Ceylon pearl fisheries was published by the Royal Asiatic Society.

In 1861 he was appointed the principal collector of customs in Ceylon.

On 1 September 1865 he was appointed as Treasurer of Ceylon by Governor Hercules Robinson, replacing Frederick Saunders. A position he retained until he retired in 1882.

In 1877 Vane was awarded Companion of the Order of St Michael and St George at the Queen's Birthday Honours.

== Family ==
On 15 December 1847 he married Harriet Braybrooke, daughter of Colonel Samuel Braybrooke, in Colombo. She was the sister-in-law of William Dumaresq Wright, Treasurer of Ceylon from 1882 to 1886.

His oldest son, Frederick William, ISO (b. 1852), served on numerous occasions as acting Postmaster-General and Director of Telegraphs, Controller of Government Stores and Secretary, Savings Bank for Ceylon, his daughter Alice Emma (1859-?), married Brigadier General August Hill (1853-1921), and his younger son, Henry George Bagnall (1861-1938), was the State Auditor and Financial Commissioner of the Federated Malay States (1909-1915).

== Publications ==
- Vane, George (1887). "The Journal of the Ceylon Branch of the Royal Asiatic Society of Great Britain & Ireland". Report on the Pearl Banks of Ceylon and the Fisheries from 1855 to 1860. 10 (34). Royal Asiatic Society of Sri Lanka: 14–40.

Government offices
Preceded by Frederick Saunders	Treasurer of Ceylon; 1843–1882	Succeeded by William Dumaresq Wright
