= Francis Templer =

British civil servant

Francis James Templer

9th Treasurer of Ceylon
- In office 1843–1854
- Preceded by: George Turnour
- Succeeded by: John Caufield

Personal details
- Born: 6 June 1791 Newton Abbot, Devon, England
- Died: 22 October 1854 (aged 63) Brighton, Sussex, England
- Spouse: Eleanor Williams (m. 1816)
- Children: Katherine Mary, Francis Buller, James Berkley, Ellen Maria, Anne Henrietta, Henry Dawson Skinner
- Parent(s): James Templer, Mary née Buller
- Profession: Colonial administrator

Francis James Templer (6 June 1791 – 22 October 1854) was a British civil servant, who served as the ninth Treasurer of Ceylon from 1 November 1843 to October 1854. He was a member of the 3rd executive council of British Ceylon, the Campbell executive council.

== Early life ==
Francis James Templer was born on 6 June 1792 at Stover House in Newton Abbot, Devon, England, the youngest son of James Templer (1748–1813) and Mary née Buller (1749–1829), third daughter of James Buller (1717–1765).

He studied at Blundell's School, Devon from 1801 to 1804.

== Civil service career ==
Templer entered the Ceylon Civil Service in 1817. He arrived, with his wife Eleanor and family, in Colombo on 13 November 1817, aboard the Alexander. He served as the provincial judge in Calpentyn, the government agent in Ratnapura, the sitting magistrate in Colombo, the collector of Chilaw (1827–1833), the collector and government agent of Colombo (1833–1843), and the fiscal of Jaffna (1845). Templer was appointed Treasurer of Ceylon, Deputy Paymaster General to the Queen's Troops and Commissioner of Stamps, by Governor Colin Campbell, on 1 November 1843 and died in office in October 1854.

Whilst he was serving as the collector of Chilaw, Templer was responsible for establishing the Anglican Church in Chilaw, St. James' Church. The community honoured his contribution by naming the church after him.

== Family ==
Templer married Eleanor Williams (1796–1877), the daughter of Anna Maria and Henry Williams, at the Church of King Charles the Martyr on 16 April 1816 at Falmouth, Cornwall. They had six children, three daughters and three sons:

- Katherine Mary (1817–1866) married Philip Wodehouse in 1833, who later served as Governor of the Cape Colony and British High Commissioner for Southern Africa;
- Francis Buller (1819–1903) who served in the Ceylon Civil Service and as a lieutenant in the Ceylon Rifle Regiment;
- James Berkley (1820–1822)
- Ellen Maria (1821–1822);
- Anne Henrietta Maria (1823–1907) married Arthur William Buller in 1842, who served as Queen's Advocate of Ceylon and as a British Liberal Party Member of Parliament;
- Henry Dawson Skinner (1826–1832)

He died on 22 October 1854 at the age of 63 in Brighton, Sussex, England.

Government offices
Preceded by George Turnour	Treasurer of Ceylon; 1843–1854	Succeeded by John Caufield
