= Financial Secretary of Ceylon =

Officer of the Ceylonese government (1932–1947)

- Member of: the Board of Ministers
- Appointer: Governor of British Ceylon
- Constituting instrument: Donoughmore Constitution
- Formation: 1809
- First holder: Robert Boyd (as Treasurer of Ceylon)
- Final holder: Oliver Goonetilleke
- Abolished: 1947
- Succession: Minister of Finance
- Deputy: Deputy Financial Secretary

The financial secretary of Ceylon was an officer of the Ceylonese Government and member of the Board of Ministers. The Treasurer of Ceylon was one of six offices that held a seat in the Executive Council of Ceylon from 1809 to 1932. The post was replaced by the that of financial secretary in 1932, as one of three officers of state of the new Board of Ministers that replaced the Executive Council under recommendations of the Donoughmore Commission. The financial secretary was in turn replaced by the new office of the Minister of Finance in 1947 under the recommendations of the Soulbury Commission under the Ceylon Independence Act, 1947 and The Ceylon (Constitution and Independence) Orders in Council 1947.

== Departments ==
- General Treasury
- Loan Board
- Government Stores Department
- Government Printing Office
- Government Assessor
- Income Tax Department
- Customs

== List of financial secretaries ==
Data based on:

- John Ferguson, Ceylon in the Jubilee Year, J. Haddon and Co.,1887
- Ceylon: Its History, People, Commerce, Industries and Resources, Plâté limited, 1924

| # | Treasurer | Took office | Left office | Appointed by |
|---|---|---|---|---|
Treasurer of Ceylon (1809-1931)
| 1 | Robert Boyd | 1809 | 1812 | Thomas Maitland |
| 2 | John William Carrington | 1812 | 1816 | Robert Brownrigg |
| 3 | Thomas Eden | 1816 | 1822 | Robert Brownrigg |
| 4 | John Drave | 1822 | 1823 | Edward Paget |
| 5 | William Granville | 1823 | 1824 | James Campbell |
| 6 | John William Carrington | 1824 | 1828 | Edward Barnes |
| 7 | William Granville | 1 May 1828 | 1841 | Edward Barnes |
| 8 | George Turnour | 1 February 1841 | 31 October 1843 | James Alexander Stewart-Mackenzie |
| 9 | Francis James Templer † | 1 November 1843 | 22 October 1854 | Colin Campbell |
| *Acting | Dillon Browne | 1848 | | George Byng |
| 10 | John Caulfield | 23 October 1854 | 30 June 1860 | George William Anderson |
| 11 | Frederick Saunders | 5 May 1861 | 1865 | Charles Justin MacCarthy |
| 12 | George Vane | 1 September 1865 | 1882 | Hercules Robinson |
| 13 | William Dumaresq Wright | 22 June 1882 | 5 August 1886 | James Robert Longden |
| 14 | George Thomas Michael O'Brien | 6 August 1886 | 1890 | Arthur Hamilton-Gordon |
| 15 | Frederick Richard Saunders | 18 October 1890 | 1899 | Arthur Havelock |
| 16 | Lionel Frederick Lee † | 1 April 1899 | 4 December 1899 | Joseph West Ridgeway |
| 17 | Charles Edward Ducat Pennycuick | 23 February 1900 | 1901 | Joseph West Ridgeway |
| 18 | Hardinge Hay Cameron | 11 June 1901 | 1904 | Joseph West Ridgeway |
| 19 | Hilgrove Clement Nicolle † | 6 September 1904 | 11 December 1908 | Henry Arthur Blake |
| 20 | Bernard Senior | 12 December 1908 | 1922 | Henry McCallum |
| 21 | Wilfrid Wentworth Woods | 22 February 1922 | 1931 | William Manning |
Financial Secretary of Ceylon (1932-1947)
| 22 | Wilfrid Wentworth Woods | 1932 | 1936 | Graeme Thomson |
| 23 | Harold James Huxham | 1936 | 1946 | Edward Stubbs |
| 24 | Oliver Ernest Goonetilleke | 1946 | 1947 | Henry Monck-Mason Moore |

== See also ==
- Governors of British Ceylon
- Chief Secretary of Ceylon
- Legal Secretary of Ceylon
- General Officer Commanding, Ceylon
- Attorney General of Sri Lanka
- Auditor General of Sri Lanka
