= William Granville (civil servant) =

5th & 7th Treasurer of Ceylon
- In office 1823–1824
- Preceded by: John Drave
- Succeeded by: John William Carrington
- In office 1 May 1828 – 1841
- Preceded by: John William Carrington
- Succeeded by: George Turnour

Personal details
- Born: 1785 England
- Died: January 1864 (aged 78–79) Bath, Somerset, England
- Resting place: St Giles' church, Stoke Poges
- Spouse: Frances née Turnour (m. 1829)
- Children: William Turnour, Emily, Frances
- Parent: Granville Penn
- Profession: Colonial administrator

William Granville (1785 – January 1864) was the Treasurer of Ceylon (now Sri Lanka) (1823–1824; 1828–1841), Commissioner of Stamps, and a member of the Executive and Legislative Councils.

William Granville was born in England in 1785, the illegitimate son of Granville Penn (1761–1844).

Granville came out to Ceylon with Sir Thomas Maitland, arriving at Galle on 13 July 1805. He rose steadily in the Service and by 1820 had become Deputy Secretary to the Government. On 5 July 1829 he married Frances née Turnour, the second daughter of the Hon. George Turnour and the niece of Cardinal Louis-François de Bausset of Paris. Granville was the second Englishman to write verse about Ceylon, Captain T. A. Anderson being the first. In 1830 a small book of his verses, Poems on Ceylon, was published in Colombo. Granville was appointed by Governor Robert Brownrigg to escort the deposed King of Kandy, Sri Vikrama Rajasinha, from Colombo to Madras. He kept a diary of the voyage, which was published in 1830, with his poems as an appendix. Granville retired in 1841 while holding the appointment of Treasurer of Ceylon.

Granville and his family returned to England and lived at Bath, where he died in January 1864, at the age of seventy-nine. His remains were brought to St Giles' church, Stoke Poges and interred with the rest of the Penn family.

Government offices
Preceded by John Drave	Treasurer of Ceylon; 1828–1841	Succeeded by John William Carrington
Preceded by John William Carrington	Treasurer of Ceylon; 1872–1873	Succeeded by George Turnour
