= William Dumaresq Wright =

Ceylonese civil servant

William Dumaresq Wright (c.1833 – 5 August 1886) was a Ceylonese civil servant, the thirteenth Treasurer of Ceylon (1882–1886) and the third Mayor of Colombo (1884–1886).

William Dumaresq Wright was born c.1833 in Colombo, the eldest son of Henry Wright, the Accountant General and Controller of Revenue of Ceylon (1841–1847) and Camilla née Lowe, the daughter of Sir Hudson Lowe.

Wright entered the Ceylon Civil Service in 1853, was the Government Agent for the North Western Province between 1871 and 1873, the Principal Collector of Customs 1873 to 1881, the Treasurer of Ceylon from February 1882 and the Mayor of Colombo from 22 June 1884, until his death in 1886.

He married Amy Delatre Braybrooke (1833–1921) on 4 July 1857, the youngest daughter of Colonel Samuel Baybrooke, in Colombo. They had two children: Mary Camilla Baybrooke (b.1864) and Dudley d'Auvergne (b.1867). Dudley, a doctor, was awarded the Chevallier of the Légion d'honneur for his work at the Hospital de L’Alliance in France in 1914.

Wright died on 5 August 1886, from injuries he received when he was thrown from a horse carriage ten days earlier.

Government offices
Preceded by George Vane	Treasurer of Ceylon; 1882–1886	Succeeded by George Thomas Michael O'Brien
