= James Walker (colonial administrator) =

Scottish colonial administrator (1809-1885)

Sir James Walker KCMG CB (9 April 1809 – 28 August 1885) was a Scottish colonial administrator.

== Life ==
The son of Andrew Walker of Edinburgh, was born there on 9 April 1809, and was educated at the Edinburgh High School and the University of Edinburgh. Entering the colonial office as a junior clerk in 1826, he served under several secretaries of state, and on 11 February 1837 he became registrar of British Honduras. Transferred on 18 February 1839 to be treasurer of Trinidad he was colonial secretary there from June 1839 to September 1840. In January 1841 he accompanied, as his secretary, Sir Henry Macleod, special commissioner to British Guiana, to settle difficulties with the legislature over the civil list. He became in 1842 colonial secretary of Barbados, at that time the seat of the government for the Windward Islands group, and during his service there Walker was sent in September 1856 to act as lieutenant-governor of Grenada, and in 1857 to fill a similar position at St Vincent.

Walker acted as governor of Barbados and the Windward Islands from 13 March to 25 December 1859, and as lieutenant-governor of Trinidad from 20 April 1860 to 25 March 1862, when he was appointed governor in chief of the Barbados and the Windward Islands. On 4 January 1869 he was transferred to the Bahamas, which were then going through a time of financial depression.

Walker retired on a pension in May 1871, and lived a country life, first at Uplands, near Taunton, and later at Southerton, Ottery St. Mary, Devon, where he died on 28 August 1885. He became a CB in 1860, and KCMG in 1869.

== Family ==
On 15 October 1839 he married Anne, daughter of George Bland of Trinidad. They had two daughters and one son. His son, Sir Edward Noël Walker, was lieutenant-governor and colonial secretary of Ceylon.

== Notes ==
Attribution

New Brunswick
