= Harold Marshall =

Harold Marshall may refer to:

- Harold Marshall (sniper) (1918–2013), Canadian World War II sergeant
- Harold Marshall (acoustician) (born 1931), New Zealand educator, consultant and musician

== See also ==
- Harry Marshall (disambiguation)
