= Henry Augustus Marshall =

British colonial administrator

10th Civil Auditor General
- In office 1823 – 1 February 1841
- Preceded by: John William Carrington
- Succeeded by: Henry Wright

Personal details
- Born: c. 1776
- Died: 23 January 1841 (aged 64) Ceylon

Henry Augustus Marshall (c. 1776 – 23 January 1841) was a British colonial administrator in British Ceylon.

== Life ==
Marshall was educated at Harrow and Charterhouse Schools and at Christ Church, Oxford.

He went out to Ceylon to join the Civil Service there in 1798 and served as a provincial judge. He became Controller-General of Customs in 1816 and was then appointed the 10th Civil Auditor General of Ceylon in 1823, succeeding J. W. Carrington. He held that office until his death in 1841, when he was succeeded by Henry Wright.

Marshall died of fever in Munwal and was buried in Galle Face Cemetery, Colombo. He had married Elizabeth Brooke and had two sons: Henry and John.

Legal offices
Preceded by John William Carrington	Civil Auditor General; 1823–1841	Succeeded by Henry Wright
