= Kandy War Cemetery =

WWII CWGC cemetery in Sri Lanka

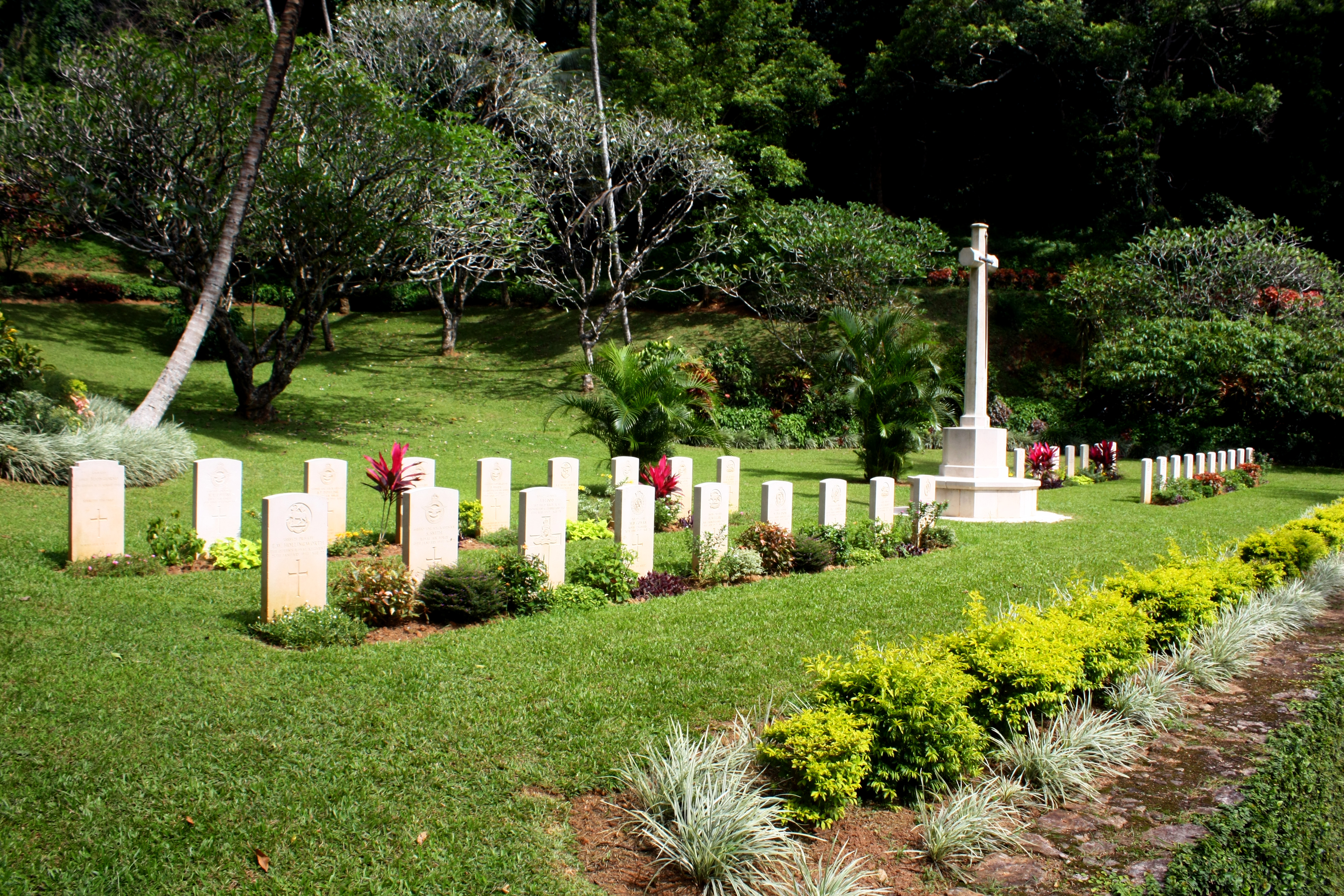
- Kandy War Cemetery
- Interactive map of Kandy War Cemetery

Details
- Location: Kandy
- Country: Sri Lanka
- Coordinates: 7.281680°N 80.608291°E
- Type: British military of WWII (closed)
- Owned by: Commonwealth War Graves Commission
- No. of graves: 203 (as per memorial inscription)
- Find a Grave: 2348664

The Kandy War Cemetery, formerly known as the Pitakande Military Cemetery, is a British military cemetery in Kandy, Sri Lanka, for soldiers of the British Empire who were killed during World War II as well as a soldier who died during World War I.

The cemetery is a Commonwealth War Graves Commission (CWGC) maintained burial site for soldiers. There are 203 buried consisting of: 107 British, 35 East Africans, 26 Sri Lankans, 23 Indians, 6 Canadians, 3 Italians, 1 Frenchman and 2 unidentified persons, Of the 203 dead, 151 were army, 32 were air force, 16 were navy, 2 were unidentified, 1 was merchant navy and 1 was from the national fire service.

== Location ==
The cemetery is located in Deveni Rajasinghe Mawatha, approximately 1.5 kilometres (0.93 mi) from the main road.

== See also ==
- British Garrison Cemetery
- Liveramentu Cemetery
- Trincomalee British War Cemetery
