= George Thomas Michael O'Brien =

British colonial official (1844-1906)

Sir George Thomas Michael O'Brien KCMG
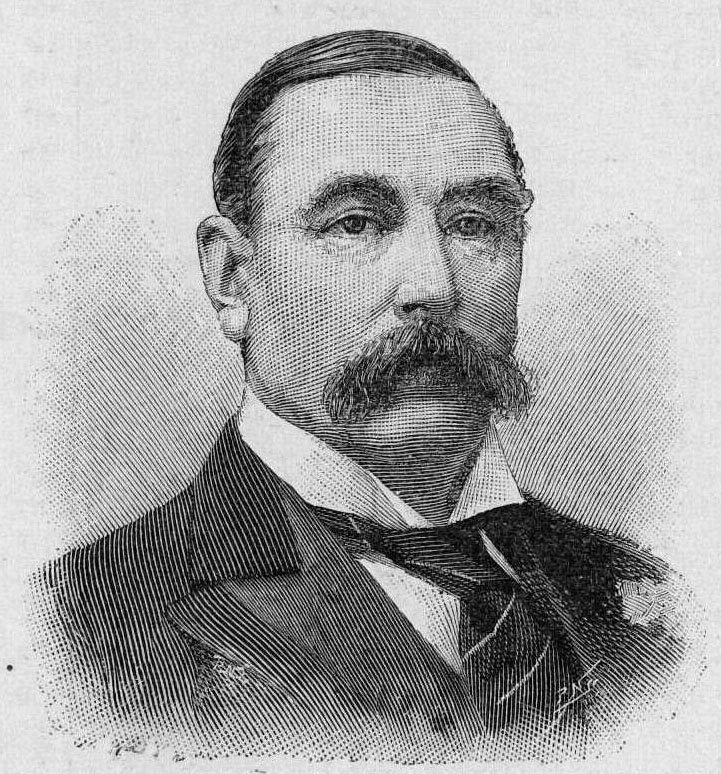

6th Governor of Fiji
- In office March 1897 – 1901
- Monarch: Victoria
- Preceded by: Sir John Thurston
- Succeeded by: Sir William Allardyce (acting)

5th High Commissioner for the Western Pacific
- In office March 1897 – 1901
- Preceded by: Sir John Thurston
- Succeeded by: Sir William Allardyce (acting)

9th Colonial Secretary of Hong Kong
- In office 1892–1895
- Preceded by: Francis Fleming
- Succeeded by: Sir James Stewart Lockhart

19th Accountant General and Controller of Revenue
- In office 18 October 1890 – 31 July 1891
- Preceded by: W. H. Ravenscroft
- Succeeded by: James Alexander Swettenham

Treasurer of Ceylon
- In office 6 August 1886 – 1890
- Preceded by: William Dumaresq Wright
- Succeeded by: Frederick Richard Saunders

Personal details
- Born: 5 November 1844
- Died: 12 April 1906 (aged 61)
- Occupation: Colonial administrator

Sir George Thomas Michael O'Brien KCMG (Chinese: 柯布連) (5 November 1844 – 12 April 1906) was a British colonial official who served as Colonial Secretary of Hong Kong from 1892 to 1895, and as Governor of Fiji and High Commissioner for the Western Pacific from 1897 to June 1901.

== Career ==
O'Brien was the 19th Accountant General and Controller of Revenue of British Ceylon. He was appointed on 18 October 1890, succeeding W. H. Ravenscroft, and held the office until 31 July 1891. He was succeeded by J. A. Swettenham. He also served as Treasurer of Ceylon from 1886 to 1890.

He became Colonial Secretary of Hong Kong in 1892, a position he held until 1895. In 1897, he succeeded John Thurston as Governor of Fiji and High Commissioner for the Western Pacific. He was recalled in June 1901 following a conflict with the New Zealand Government led by Richard Seddon regarding a proposed Federation of Fiji and New Zealand.

He died in 1906.

O'Brien Road (柯布連道) in Wan Chai, Hong Kong was named after him.

Legal offices
Preceded by W. H. Ravenscroft	Accountant General and Controller of Revenue; 1890–1891	Succeeded by J. A. Swettenham
Government offices
Preceded by William Dumaresq Wright	Treasurer of Ceylon; 1886–1890	Succeeded by Frederick Richard Saunders
Preceded by Francis Fleming	Colonial Secretary of Hong Kong; 1892–1895	Succeeded by Sir James Stewart Lockhart
Preceded by Sir John Bates Thurston	High Commissioner for the Western Pacific; 1897–1901	Succeeded by William Lamond Allardyce, acting
Preceded by Sir John Bates Thurston	Governor of Fiji; 1897–1901	Succeeded by William Lamond Allardyce, acting
