= C. A. D. Barclay =

British colonial administrator

Sir Colville Arthur Durell Barclay, 11th Baronet

17th Accountant General and Controller of Revenue
- In office 16 June 1876 – 23 May 1877
- Preceded by: John Douglas
- Succeeded by: W. H. Ravenscroft

Personal details
- Born: 20 December 1829
- Died: 18 February 1896 (aged 66) Paris, France
- Spouse: Louise Melanie de Belzim

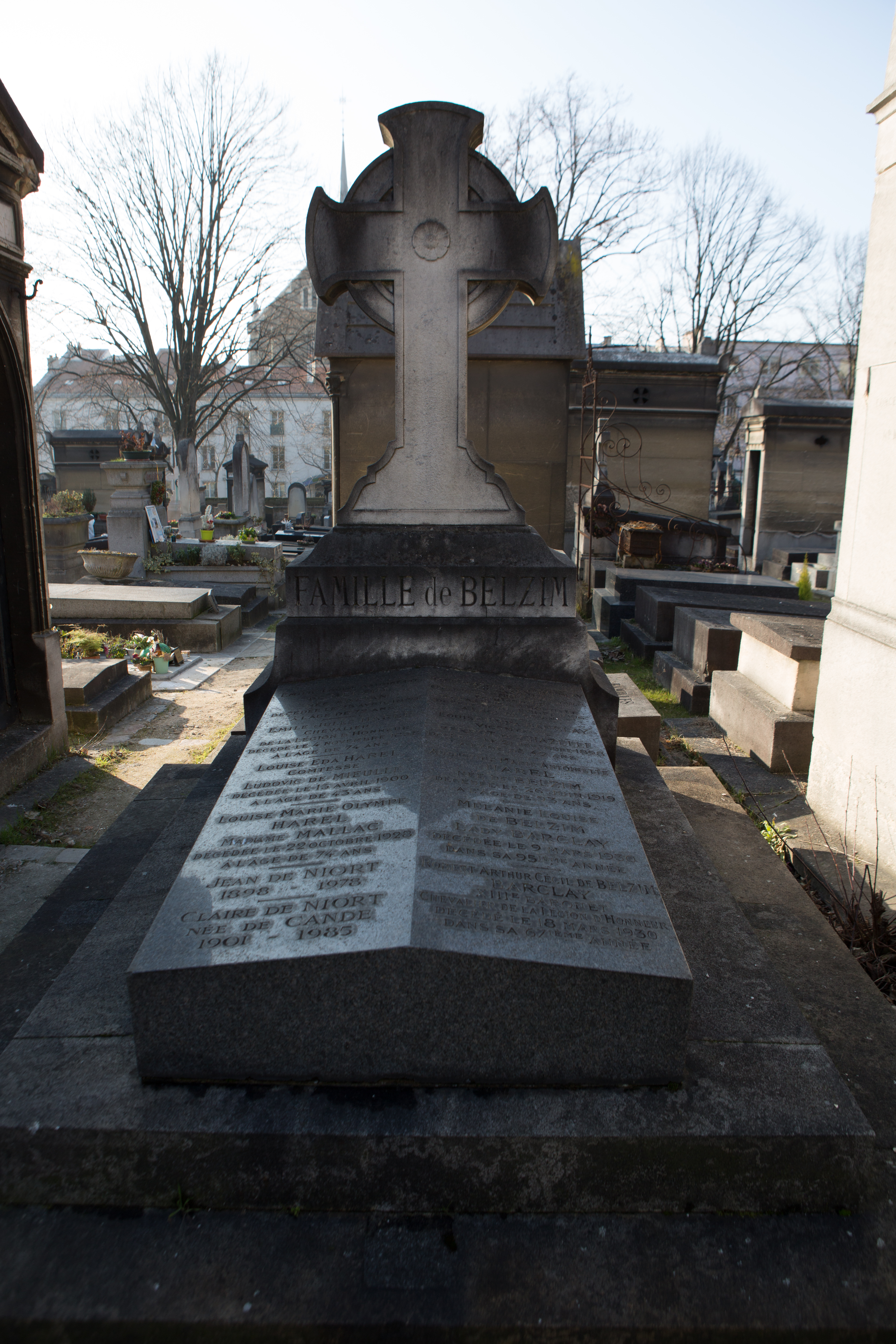
Père-Lachaise Cemetery

Sir Colville Arthur Durell Barclay, 11th Baronet, CMG (20 December 1829 – 18 February 1896) was a British colonial administrator and the 17th Auditor General and Accountant General and Controller of Revenue of Sri Lanka (then called Ceylon).

He was born the son of Sir David William Barclay of Pierston, Ayrshire, 10th Baronet, whom he succeeded as 11th Baronet in 1888. He was educated at Grosvenor College, Bath.

He joined the Colonial Service in 1846 and was posted to Mauritius, where he became a Member of the Legislative Council, Collector of Customs and Receiver-General.

He was appointed Auditor General of Ceylon on 16 June 1876, succeeding John Douglas, and held the office until 23 May 1877. He was succeeded by W. H. Ravenscroft.

He was made CMG in 1878.

He died in Paris in 1896. He had married Louise Melanie de Belzim, with whom he had three sons. He was succeeded as 12th Baronet by his eldest son, Sir David Edward Durell Barclay.

Legal offices
Preceded by John Douglas	Accountant General and Controller of Revenue; 1876–1877	Succeeded by W. H. Ravenscroft
Baronetage of Nova Scotia
Preceded by David William Barclay	Baronet (of Pierston); 1888–1896	Succeeded by David Edward Barclay
