= W. H. Ravenscroft =

18th Auditor General and Accountant General and Controller of Revenue of Ceylon

William Henry Ravenscroft

18th Accountant General and Controller of Revenue
- In office 23 May 1877 – 29 May 1890
- Preceded by: C. A. D. Barclay
- Succeeded by: G. T. M. O'Brien

Personal details
- Born: 11 January 1843 St Pancras, London
- Died: 29 May 1890 (aged 47) Colombo, Ceylon
- Spouse: Edith Elizabeth Fox

William Henry Ravenscroft, CMG (11 January 1843 – 29 May 1890) was the 18th Auditor General and Accountant General and Controller of Revenue of Ceylon.

He was born the son of Henry William Ravenscroft of London. He served in the Commissariat Department of the Army from 1861 to 1874 and as Auditor-General for Griqualand West in 1876.

He was appointed Auditor General of Ceylon on 23 May 1877, succeeding C. A. D. Barclay, and held the office until his death in 1890, when he was succeeded by G. T. M. O'Brien.

He died in Ceylon in 1890. He had married Edith Elizabeth Fox and had 2 sons and a daughter.

Legal offices
Preceded by C. A. D. Barclay	Accountant General and Controller of Revenue; 1877–1890	Succeeded by G. T. M. O'Brien
