= John Marshall (cricketer, born 1816) =

English cricketer

Personal information
- Full name: John Augustus Browne Marshall
- Born: 23 October 1816; Colombo, British Ceylon
- Died: December 1861 (aged 45); Penzance, Cornwall, England
- Relatives: Henry Marshall (brother)

Domestic team information
- Years: Team
- 1837: Cambridge University

Career statistics
Competition	First-class
Matches	6
Runs scored	29
Batting average	3.22
100s/50s	0/0
Top score	7
Catches/stumpings	1/–
- Source: Cricinfo, 20 July 2013

John Augustus Browne Marshall (23 October 1816 – December 1861) was an English cricketer. Marshall's batting style is unknown. He was born at Colombo in British Ceylon.

While studying at St John's College, Cambridge, Marshall made his debut in first-class cricket for the university cricket club against Cambridge Town Club in 1837 at Parker's Piece, making a further first-class appearance against the Marylebone Cricket Club (MCC). Later he became a travelling club cricketer in the West Country, and made further first-class appearances for the West of England against the MCC in 1844 and 1845. In six first-class matches, Marshall scored 29 runs at an average of 3.22, with a highest score of 7.

He died at Penzance, Cornwall in December 1861. His brother Henry also played first-class cricket.
