= Henry Marshall (cricketer, born 1831) =

English cricketer

Henry Marshall (22 April 1831 – 30 April 1914) was an English first-class cricketer active 1853–63 who played for Surrey. He was born in Godalming and died in Ipswich. He played in 17 first-class matches.
