= Henry Marshall (cricketer, born 1820) =

English cricketer and clergyman

Personal information
- Full name: Henry James Marshall
- Born: 1820; Colombo, Low Country Sinhalese, British Ceylon
- Died: 2 January 1894 (aged 73/74); Beaford, Devon, England
- Relatives: John Marshall (brother)

Domestic team information
- Years: Team
- 1844–1845: MCC

Career statistics
Competition	First-class
Matches	5
Runs scored	55
Batting average	5.50
100s/50s	0/0
Top score	13
Catches/stumpings	0/–
- Source: Cricinfo, 13 August 2021

Henry James Marshall (1820 — 2 January 1894) was an English first-class cricketer and clergyman.

The son of Henry Augustus Marshall, a colonial administrator in British Ceylon, he was born in Ceylon at Colombo in 1820. He later attended St John's College, Cambridge. He played first-class cricket for the Marylebone Cricket Club in 1844 and 1845, making five appearances. He had little success in these matches, scoring 55 runs with a high score of 13. Although he was a student of the Inner Temple, it was not a career in law that Marshall decided to pursue, but one as a clergyman in the Church of England. He was ordained as a deacon at Lichfield Cathedral in 1847 and was made curate of Belper in the same year. In 1850 he went to Somerset, where he held two curacies at Dunkerton and Sutton Montis. The following year he was appointed curate of Dilton Marsh in Wiltshire, a post he held until 1852 when he became curate at Melksham. From 1854 to 1856, he was secretary of the Jew's Society for South West England. Marshall was appointed curate in Bath at Margaret's Chapel and a lecturer in the city at Walcot in 1856, before moving to Scotland in 1859, where he was curate at Montrose until 1860. His stay in Scotland was brief, with Marshall returning to Somerset in 1860, where became reverend at Clapton in Gordano. He was reverend there until 1877, before becoming reverend at Beaford in Devon. He held the reverendship there until his death in January 1894. His brother, John, was also a first-class cricketer.
