= R. J. Callander =

Robert John Callander

15th Accountant General and Controller of Revenue
- In office 3 January 1866 – 10 March 1870
- Preceded by: Richard Pennefather
- Succeeded by: John Douglas

Robert John Callander was the 15th Accountant General and Controller of Revenue in Ceylon.

He was appointed on 3 January 1866, succeeding Richard Pennefather, and held the office until 10 March 1870, when he was succeeded by John Douglas.

Legal offices
Preceded by R. T. Pennefather	Accountant General and Controller of Revenue; 1866–1870	Succeeded by John Douglas
