= Charles John Irving =

British civil servant in the Malay Peninsula

The Honourable Charles John Irving CMG

Resident Councillor of Penang
- In office 1885–1887
- Preceded by: Major Samuel Dunlop (Acting)
- Succeeded by: Allan Maclean Skinner

Acting Lieutenant-Governor of Penang
- In office 10 February 1879 – 16 May 1880
- Preceded by: Major General Edward Anson
- Succeeded by: Major General Edward Anson

Acting Colonial Secretary of Straits Settlements
- In office 1875 – 17 February 1876
- Monarch: Queen Victoria
- Governor: Sir William Jervois
- Preceded by: William Willans (Acting)
- Succeeded by: Sir John Douglas

Auditor-General of Straits Settlements
- In office 1867–1879

Personal details
- Born: 7 February 1831; Isabelle Place, Camberwell, London
- Died: 23 February 1917 (aged 86); Sarlsdowr, Exmouth
- Spouse: Mary Jane Tompkins
- Parents: Charles Mitchell Irving (father); Anne Dorothea Madgwick (mother)

Charles John Irving, CMG, (7 February 1831 – 23 February 1917) was a British civil servant in the Malay Peninsula.

== Career ==
He was with the Colonial and Immigration Office from 1852 to 1853 and a clerk in the Audit Office at Mauritius from 1853 to 1864. He was one of the very few Straits officials who had studied the Malay political and social systems. He was an expert on native affairs on the Malay Peninsula whom Governors Ord and Anson used in different negotiations. In 1871 Anson sent James W. W. Birch, then Colonial Secretary, together with Auditor-General Irving to see Sultan Abdul Samad at Langat to re-establish order there.

He was acting Lieutenant-Governor of Penang from 1879 to 1880, Resident Councillor of Penang from 1885 to 1887, Colonial Auditor General to the government of the Straits Settlements at Penang from 1867 to 1879 and acting Colonial Secretary of Straits Settlements from 1875 to 1876 under governors Sir Harry Ord, Edward Anson and Sir William Jervois.

He was a member of the newly formed Straits Branch of the Royal Asiatic Society in Singapore, acting as the society's president around 1883.

== Honours ==
He was appointed Companion of the Order of St Michael and St George (CMG) in 1881.

Government offices
| Preceded by William Willans as Acting Colonial Secretary | Acting Colonial Secretary of Straits Settlements; 1875–1876 | Succeeded by Sir John Douglas |
