= John Douglas (colonial administrator) =

Irish colonial administrator

Sir John Douglas KCMG
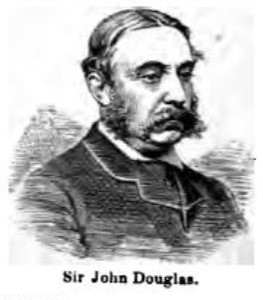

Acting Governor of British Ceylon
- In office 10 July 1883 – 3 December 1883
- Monarch: Queen Victoria
- Preceded by: James Robert Longden
- Succeeded by: Arthur Hamilton-Gordon

3rd Colonial Secretary of Straits Settlements
- In office 17 February 1876 – 17 August 1878
- Monarch: Queen Victoria
- Governor: Sir William Jervois; William C. F. Robinson
- Preceded by: Charles J. Irving (Acting)
- Succeeded by: Sir Cecil Clementi Smith

16th Accountant General and Controller of Revenue
- In office 10 March 1870 – 16 June 1876
- Preceded by: Robert John Callander
- Succeeded by: C. A. D. Barclay

Personal details
- Born: 5 December 1836 Limerick, Ireland
- Died: 22 August 1885 (aged 48) British Ceylon
- Resting place: St Paul's Church, Kandy, British Ceylon
- Spouse: Alice Anne Claughton
- Parents: Lt Gen Sir James Dawes Douglas (father); Marianne Bullock (mother)

Sir John Douglas KCMG (5 December 1836 – 22 August 1885) was the Irish-born son of Lt Gen Sir James Dawes Douglas (1795–1862) and Marianne Bullock.

== Career ==
Douglas was in the Civil Service of Mauritius 1859–1869 when he transferred to Ceylon where he was Auditor-General between 1869 and 1876. He became Colonial Secretary of the Straits Settlements on 17 February 1876 – 17 August 1878 before returning to Ceylon as Lieut.-Governor and Colonial Secretary, 1878–1880. He was appointed Acting Governor, 10 July 1883 – 3 December 1883.

== Honours ==
Douglas was appointed Knight Commander of the Order of St Michael and St George (KCMG) in the 1883 Birthday Honours.

== Family ==
Douglas had married, in 1871, Alice Anne, daughter of Right Rev. Piers Calveley Claughton (d. 1884), Bishop of Colombo, Ceylon. They had five children.

== Death ==
Sir John Douglas died in Ceylon on 23 August 1885 and was buried at St Paul's Church, Kandy.

Government offices
Preceded by Charles J. Irving (Acting)	3rd Colonial Secretary of Straits Settlements; 1876–1878	Succeeded by Sir Cecil Clementi Smith
Preceded by James Robert Longden	Governor of British Ceylon; 1883	Succeeded by Arthur Hamilton-Gordon
Legal offices
Preceded by R. J. Callander	Accountant General and Controller of Revenue; 1870–1876	Succeeded by C. A. D. Barclay
