= Edward Noël Walker =

British colonial administrator

Sir Edward Noël Walker KCMG

Acting Governor of British Ceylon
- In office 24 October 1895 – 10 February 1896
- Monarch: Queen Victoria
- Preceded by: Arthur Elibank Havelock (Acting governor)
- Succeeded by: Joseph West Ridgeway

Personal details
- Born: 28 April 1842 Dover, Kent
- Died: 20 September 1908 (aged 66) Bath, Somerset

Sir Edward Noël Walker KCMG (28 April 1842 – 20 September 1908) was a British colonial administrator who served as acting Governor of British Ceylon.

Walker was the son of Sir James Walker, also a colonial administrator, and Anne Brand. He was educated at Cheltenham College and Glasgow University.

Walker entered on a colonial administrative career at an early age. In 1862, aged 20, he was posted to the office of the Governor of the Windward Islands, becoming the official's private secretary in 1866, having from 1864 to 1866 acted in the same capacity to the Lieutenant-Governor of St Vincent.

In 1867, he was appointed assistant Government Secretary and clerk of the Court of Policy and Combined Court of British Guiana. In 1874, he went to Jamaica and took up the post of assistant Colonial Secretary, becoming the Colonial Secretary in 1883. In 1887, he was transferred to Ceylon where he served as Colonial Secretary until 1890, when he became Lieutenant-Governor and was frequently called upon to manage the Government. He was appointed acting Governor of British Ceylon on 24 October 1895 and was acting Governor until 10 February 1896. He was succeeded by Joseph West Ridgeway.

Walker retired to London in 1901, and participated in local municipal affairs as a member of Kensington Borough Council. He was created a CMG in 1885 and a KCMG in 1888. In 1871, he married a daughter of H.S.Buscom of British Guiana. He died in Bath, Somerset on 20 September 1908.

Government offices
Preceded by Arthur Elibank Havelock	acting Governor of British Ceylon; 1895–1896	Succeeded by Joseph West Ridgeway
