= Hilgrove Clement Nicolle =

British civil servant

Hilgrove Clement Nicolle (19 July 1855 – 11 December 1908) was a British civil servant, who served as the Auditor General of Cyprus (1883-1889), the Auditor for Hong Kong (1890-1904), and the Treasurer of Ceylon (1904-1908).

Hilgrove Clement Nicolle was born on 19 July 1855 in Saint Helier, Jersey, the seventh child and fourth son of Josué Manger Nicolle (1810-1886) and Harriet Beresford née Nicolson (1817-1898), the daughter of Major Gideon Nicolson. Along with his siblings Nicolle attended Victoria College, Jersey.

He started his career working for the London and Westminster Bank in London. In February 1880 he joined the Foreign Office, and was appointed an assistant auditor at British Cyprus. He served three years before being promoted to Auditor General of Cyprus. Between 1886 and 1889 he also served as the British delegate of Evkaf. Evkaf is an Islamic foundation created to administer properties donated under Islamic law. In addition during his tenure in Cyprus he was also the mayor of Nicosia.

In January 1890 he was appointed as the Auditor for Hong Kong. In 1894 he was called upon to assist combating the plague in Victoria, Hong Kong and for his service he was awarded a gold medal by the government. In March 1900 he was appointed to the Legislative Council of Hong Kong.

In February 1904 he was transferred to British Ceylon by the Secretary of State to investigate into the system of public accounts in the colony, which led to his appointment as Treasurer of Ceylon and Commissioner of Stamps on 6 September that year.

Nicolle died on 11 December 1908 in Colombo of typhoid.
