= George William Anderson =

British politician

Sir George William Anderson

10th Governor of British Ceylon
- In office 27 November 1850 – 18 January 1855
- Monarch: Queen Victoria
- Preceded by: Charles Justin MacCarthy (Acting governor)
- Succeeded by: Charles Justin MacCarthy (Acting governor)

Personal details
- Born: 1791
- Died: 12 March 1857 (aged approx. 66)

Sir George William Anderson (1791 – 12 March 1857) was the officiating governor of Bombay during the British Raj from 28 April 1841 to 9 June 1842.

Anderson entered the Bombay Civil Service in 1806. He was responsible for drawing up the Bombay Civil Code of 1827 and served as a judge in the Sadr Diwani and Sadr Faujdari courts. In 1838, he was named to the Indian Law Commission and from 1843 to 1846 was President of the Bombay Branch of the Royal Asiatic Society. He was knighted in 1849.

He was 7th Governor of Mauritius from 8 June 1849 until 19 October 1850, when he was appointed governor of Ceylon, following the harsh suppression of the 1848 civil uprising by the previous office holder, Viscount Torrington. He resigned in 1855.

Government offices
Preceded by Sir William Maynard Gomm	Governor of Mauritius; 1849–1850	Succeeded by Sir James Macaulay Higginson
Preceded by Charles Justin MacCarthy acting governor	Governor of British Ceylon; 1850-1855	Succeeded by Charles Justin MacCarthy acting governor
