= HMS Vengeance (1793) =

Sloop of the Royal Navy

History

Great Britain
- Name: HMS Vengeance
- Acquired: 1793 (by purchase)
- Fate: Sold 1804

General characteristics
- Type: galliot
- Tons burthen: 110 (bm)
- Propulsion: Sails
- Complement: 30
- Armament: 3 guns

HMS Vengeance was a galliot that the Admiralty purchased in 1793; she may have been the former Lady Augusta. She was commissioned into the Royal Navy in June 1795 under Lieutenant John Wilson, for Sheerness. She was paid off on 19 February 1796 at Portsmouth. The Navy loaned her to the Transport Board in March. She was fitted at Portsmouth in November. In 1803 the Navy offered the Vengeance, gun-vessel, of 110 tons, for sale at Portsmouth. She was sold in November 1804.
