= W. C. Gibson =

British colonial official

William Charles Gibson

13th Accountant General and Controller of Revenue
- In office 1 October 1851 – 24 June 1861
- Preceded by: Charles Justin MacCarthy
- Succeeded by: Richard Theodore Pennefather

William Charles Gibson was the 13th Accountant General and Controller of Revenue of Ceylon. He was appointed on 1 October 1851, succeeding Charles Justin MacCarthy, and held the office until 1861. He was succeeded by R. T. Pennefather.

Legal offices
Preceded by Charles Justin MacCarthy	Accountant General and Controller of Revenue; 1851–1861	Succeeded by R. T. Pennefather
