= Richard Pennefather (colonial administrator) =

Richard Theodore Pennefather

14th Accountant General and Controller of Revenue
- In office 24 June 1861 – 27 September 1865
- Preceded by: William Charles Gibson
- Succeeded by: Robert John Callander

Personal details
- Born: c. 1828 Ireland
- Died: 27 September 1865 Ceylon

Richard Theodore Pennefather (c. 1828 – 27 September 1865) was the 14th Accountant General and Controller of Revenue of British Ceylon, (now Sri Lanka).

He was born the son of Judge Edward Pennefather of Leap Castle, County Offaly, Ireland, the Lord Chief Justice of Ireland and his wife Susanna Darby.

From 1848 to 1854 he was the private secretary of Sir Edmund Walker Head, Lieutenant Governor of New Brunswick, and followed him to the Province of Canada in 1854 when Head became Governor General of Canada. He was made responsible for Indian affairs for part of his time there but left Canada in 1861 when Head's term of office expired.

He was appointed Accountant General and Controller of Revenue of Ceylon on 25 April 1861, succeeding William Charles Gibson, and held the office until his death in 1865, when he was succeeded by Robert John Callander.

Legal offices
Preceded by W. C. Gibson	Accountant General and Controller of Revenue; 1861–1866	Succeeded by R. J. Callander
