= Joseph West Ridgeway =

British civil servant and colonial governor

Colonel, The Right Honourable Sir Joseph West Ridgeway GCB GCMG KCSI
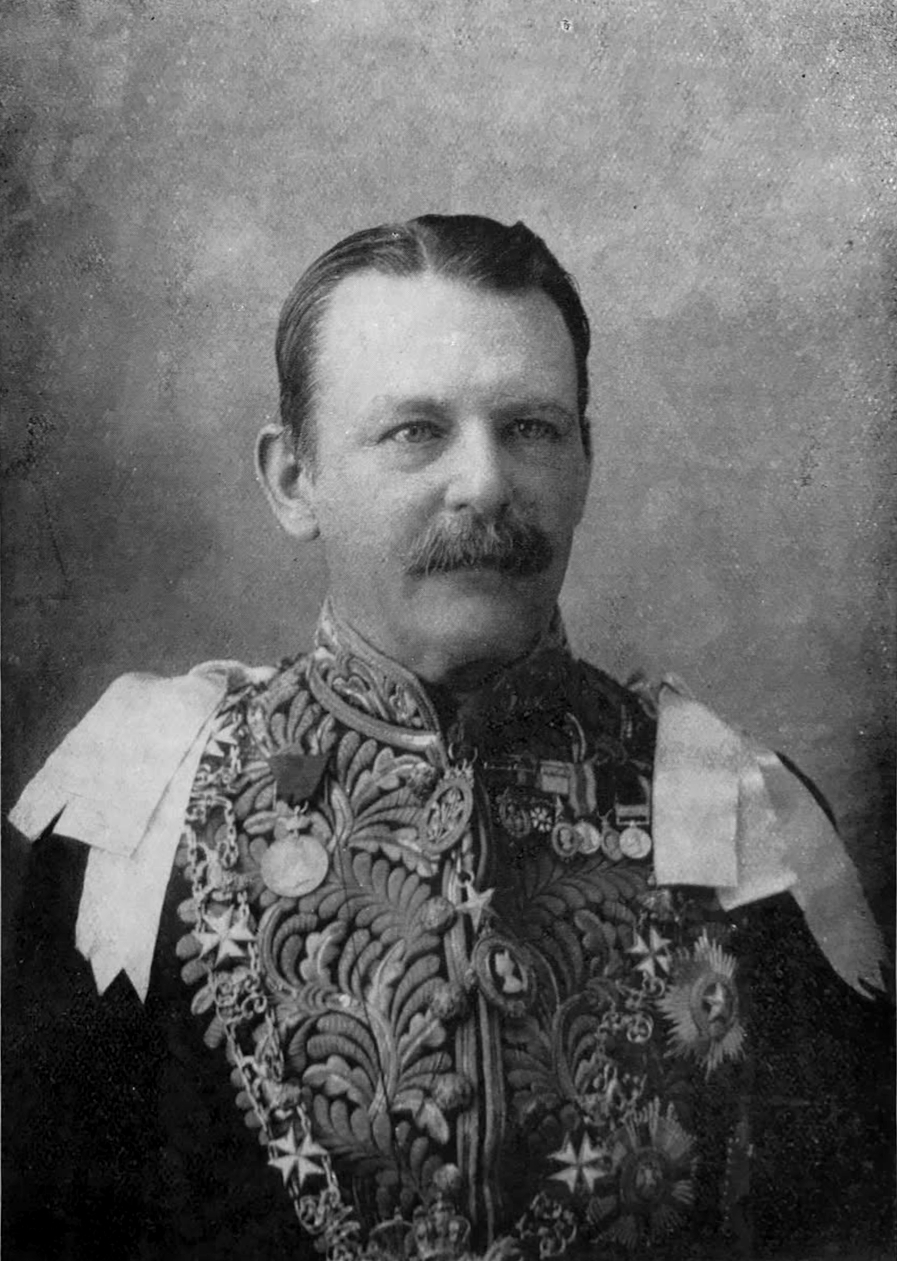

18th Governor of British Ceylon
- In office 10 February 1896 – 19 November 1903
- Monarchs: Victoria, Edward VII
- Preceded by: Edward Noël Walker (Acting governor)
- Succeeded by: Sir Everard im Thurn (Acting governor)

11th Lieutenant Governor of the Isle of Man
- In office 1893–1895
- Monarch: Victoria
- Preceded by: Sir Spencer Walpole
- Succeeded by: The Lord Henniker

Personal details
- Born: Joseph West Ridgeway; 16 May 1844 High Roding, Essex, England, United Kingdom
- Died: 16 April 1930 (aged 85) London, England
- Spouse: Carolina Ellen "Lina" Bewicke

Military service
- Branch/service: Bengal Infantry
- Years of service: 1860–1869
- Rank: Colonel

Sir Joseph West Ridgeway, GCB, GCMG, KCSI, PC (Ire) (16 May 1844 – 16 April 1930), known as Sir West Ridgeway, was a British civil servant and colonial governor. He was involved in the MacDonald Affair, when sodomy and child molestation charges were brought against Hector Archibald MacDonald, commander of British forces in British Ceylon. He brought MacDonald back to England hoping to avoid a scandal, but MacDonald still committed suicide.

== Military career ==
Educated at St Paul's School, London, Ridgeway was commissioned into the Bengal Infantry in 1860. In 1869 he was selected for civil employment in India. In 1881 he married Carolina Ellen "Lina" Bewicke.

== Colonial service ==
In 1884 Ridgeway was given command of the Indian section of the Afghan Boundary Commission, established by Russia and the United Kingdom to determine the northern boundary of Afghanistan. The following year he became Chief Commissioner. He was Under-Secretary for Ireland from 1887 to 1892, and Lieutenant Governor of the Isle of Man from 1893 to 1895.

He was Governor of Ceylon (now Sri Lanka) from 1896 to 1903. During that time, he was involved in bringing charges of sodomy and pederasty against Hector MacDonald, commander of the troops in Ceylon. Ridgeway advised MacDonald to return to London, his main concern being to avoid a massive scandal: "Some, indeed most, of his victims ... are the sons of the best-known men in the Colony, English and native", he wrote, noting that he had persuaded the local press to keep quiet in hopes that "no more mud" would be stirred up. After facing increasing pressure from the allegations, MacDonald committed suicide in 1903.

He stood unsuccessfully for election to the House of Commons as a Liberal, in the City of London in 1906, when he was defeated by Sir Edward George Clarke, K.C; and in the London University constituency at the election of January 1910.

From 1910 to 1926, he was President of the North Borneo Chartered Company, which controlled the territory of North Borneo.

== Honours ==
- GCMG: Knight Grand Cross of the Order of St Michael and St George – 1 January 1900 – New Year Honours list
- LL.D. (honorary), University of Cambridge, May 1902.
- LL.D (honorary), University of Edinburgh, 26 July 1902.

A species of Asian snake, Lytorhynchus ridgewayi, is named in his honour.

Government offices
Preceded by Sir Spencer Walpole	Lieutenant Governor of the Isle of Man; 1893–1895	Succeeded by Lord Henniker
Preceded by Edward Noël Walker acting governor	Governor of Ceylon; 1896–1903	Succeeded by Sir Everard im Thurn acting governor
Preceded by William Clark Cowie; Chairman	President of the North Borneo Chartered Company; 1910-1926	Succeeded by Neill Malcolm
