= Charles Justin MacCarthy =

12th Governor of British Ceylon

Sir Charles Justin MacCarthy
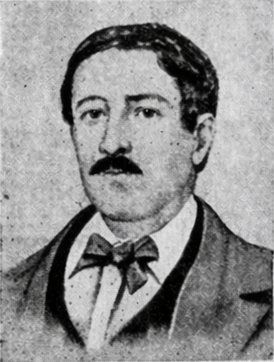

12th Governor of British Ceylon
- In office 22 October 1860 – 1 December 1863
- Monarch: Queen Victoria
- Preceded by: Charles Edmund Wilkinson (Acting governor)
- Succeeded by: Terence O'Brien (Acting governor)
- Acting; 18 January 1855 – 11 May 1855
- Monarch: Queen Victoria
- Preceded by: George William Anderson
- Succeeded by: Henry George Ward
- Acting; 18 October 1850 – 27 November 1850
- Monarch: Queen Victoria
- Preceded by: The Viscount Torrington
- Succeeded by: George William Anderson

12th Accountant General and Controller of Revenue
- In office 28 May 1847 – 1 October 1851
- Preceded by: Henry Wright
- Succeeded by: W. C. Gibson

Personal details
- Born: 1811 Brighton, England
- Died: 15 August 1864 (aged 52–53) Spa, Belgium

Sir Charles Justin MacCarthy (1811–1864) was the 12th Governor of British Ceylon and the 12th Accountant General and Controller of Revenue. He was appointed on 22 October 1860 and was Governor until 1 December 1863. He also served as acting governor on two separate occasions. He was first appointed in 1850.

== Life ==
His parents were Donough and Mary MacCarthy, and he was born in Brighton. He was a relation of Nicholas Wiseman, and in the early 1830s was in Rome, with a view to entering the Roman Catholic priesthood. Under the influence of the ideas of Lamennais, however, he ceased theological studies. In Rome through Wiseman he met Monckton Milnes, who became a lifelong friend. Milnes then helped him into a colonial career.

MacCarthy was knighted in 1857. In office he adopted a policy of financial retrenchment. His main aim was to promote railway construction. He left Ceylon in December 1863, in poor health. He died at Spa, Belgium, on 15 August 1864.

== Family ==
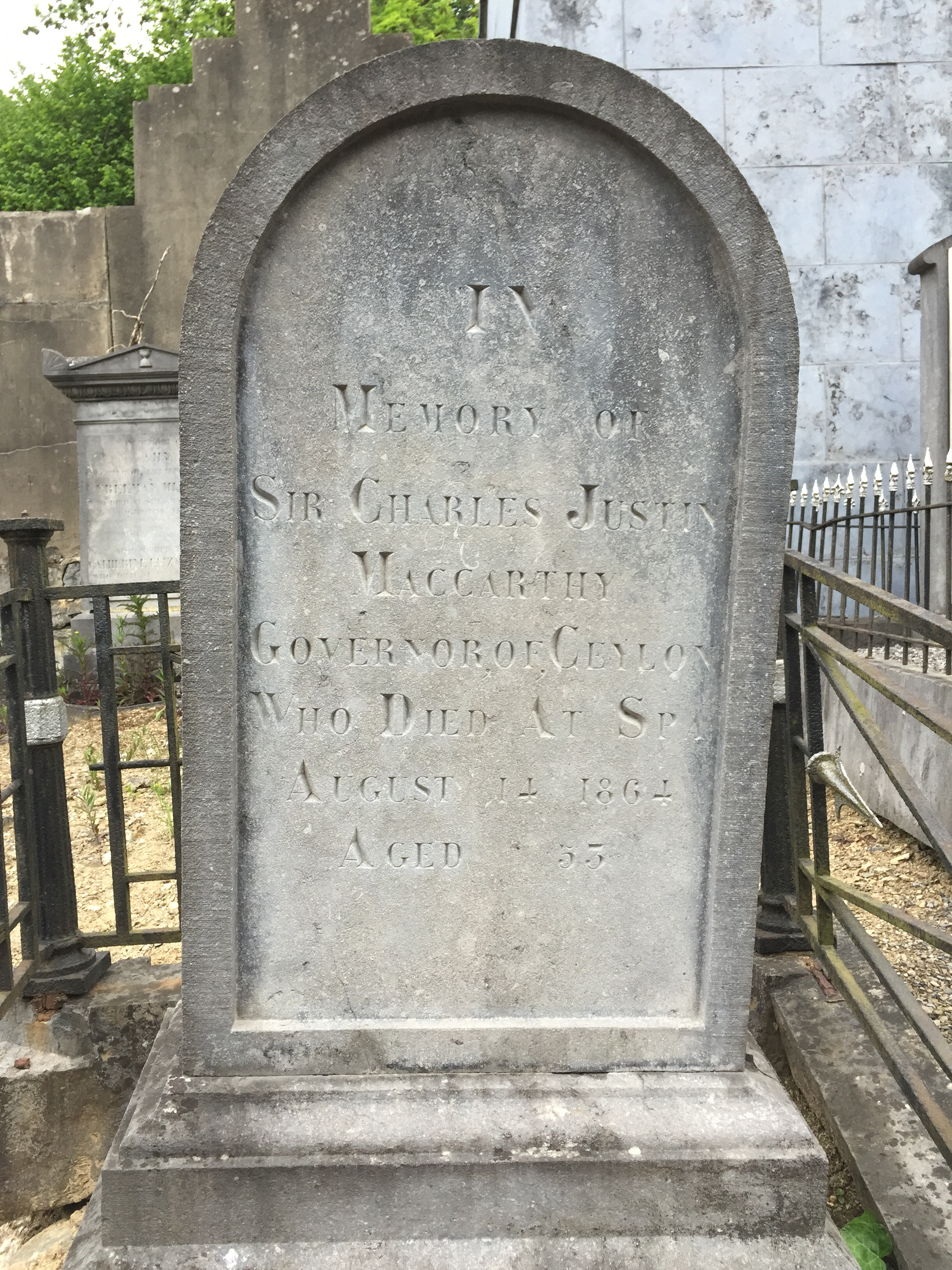
Tombstone of Charles Justin MacCarthy on the Spa cemetery in 2015.

MacCarthy married in 1848 Sophia Brunel Hawes, botanist and eldest daughter of Sir Benjamin Hawes. They had a son, Charles Philip.

Government offices
Preceded by The Viscount Torrington	Acting; Governor of British Ceylon; 1850-1850	Succeeded by George William Anderson
Preceded by George William Anderson	Acting; Governor of British Ceylon; 1855-1855	Succeeded by Henry George Ward
Preceded by Charles Edmund Wilkinson acting governor	Governor of British Ceylon; 1860–1863	Succeeded by Terence O'Brien acting governor
Legal offices
Preceded by Henry Wright	Accountant General and Controller of Revenue; 1847–1851	Succeeded by W. C. Gibson
