= Government Agent (Sri Lanka) =

A Government Agent (GA) or a District Secretary is a Sri Lankan civil servant of the Sri Lanka Administrative Service appointed by the central government to govern a certain district of the country. The GA is the administrative head of public services in the District. As Sri Lanka has 25 districts, there are 25 governments agents at any given time.

== History ==
The origins of the role of Government Agent, can be traced back to the appointment of Madrassi Revenue Collectors, whose office became known as a Kachcheri. Following the annexation of the Kingdom of Kandy, the British Governor appointed Resident Agents and Assistant Agents to different parts of the island to overlook revenue collection and maintain government control.

The administrative reforms carried out following the Colebrooke–Cameron Commission of Inquiry, the administration of the coastal provinces and the provinces of the former Kingdom of Kandy were merged into a central system which divided the island into five provinces on 1 October 1833. Each province would be headed by a Government Agent (GA) appointed by the British Governor of Ceylon and with Assistant Government Agents (AGA) in charge of outlying districts answerable to the GA of the province. With these reforms the Ceylon Civil Service was established and GAs and AGAs were exclusively appointed from the Ceylon Civil Service. Each GA had his office the local Kachcheri, which was the Revenue Collector's Office dating back from the Dutch period.

GA and AGA appointments were made from the Ceylon Civil Service (CCS) which was formed in 1833. CCS was initially made up of British, Ceylonese were first admitted to the CCS in 1870. However it was only in the 1920s did the first Ceylonese GA appointed. The role of the GA during the colonial administration, was primary collection of revenue, administration of law and order, allocation of crown land, and supervision of irrigation.

Until 1956 there were nine Provincial Kachcheries, headed by a GA who administered their own district and exercised nominal authority over thirteen District Kachcheries, headed by AGAs. In 1956, the heads of all twenty-two districts were now designated GAs, who were all from the CCS and came under the preview of the Ministry of Home Affairs. The GA functioned as the reprehensive of the government in the district. The original responsibility to maintain law and order, soon transferred to the police and Judiciary; GA retained residual control over the police, and excised during times of crisis.

== Notable agents ==
- L. B. Abeyaratne
- Sarath Amunugama
- Hamilton Shirley Amerasinghe
- Robert Atherton
- A. M. A. Azeez
- N. Q. Dias
- Hardinge Hay Cameron
- V. Coomaraswamy
- Victor Gunasekara
- L. L. Hunter
- M. Rajendra
- V. M. Panchalingam
- L. S. B. Perera
- Francis Templer
- George Vane
- Nissanka Wijeyeratne
- Leonard Woolf
- John Penry Lewis

== See also ==
- Kachcheri
- Sri Lanka Administrative Service
- Ceylon Civil Service
- Government of Sri Lanka
