= British Garrison Cemetery =

Commonwealth War Graves Commission cemetery in Sri Lanka

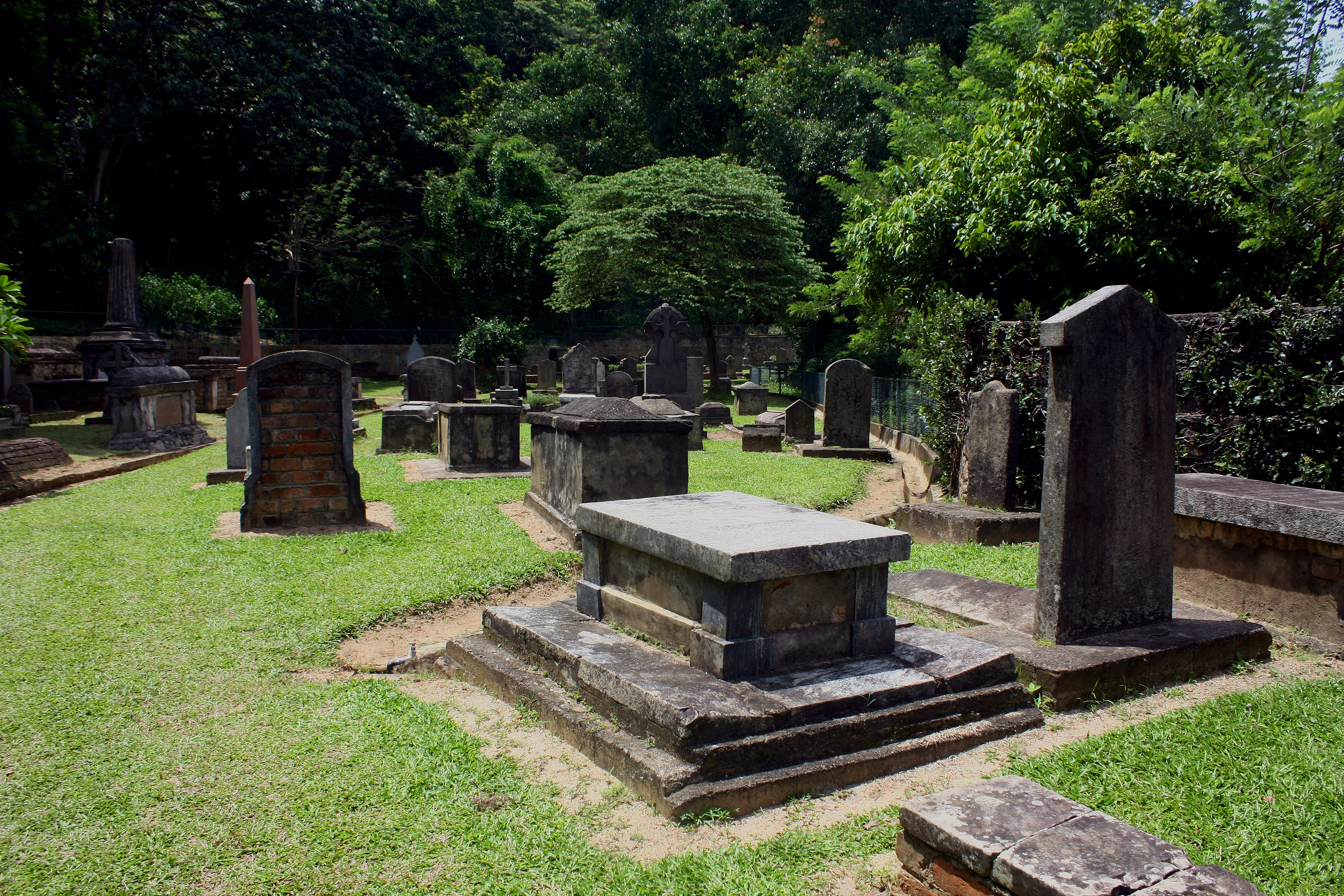
- British Garrison Cemetery
- Interactive map of British Garrison Cemetery

Details
- Established: 1817
- Location: Kandy
- Country: Sri Lanka
- Coordinates: 7.2928°N 80.6432°E
- Type: European graveyard (closed)
- Owned by: Commonwealth War Graves Commission (Friends of British Garrison Cemetery)
- Size: 0.3 ha (0.74 acres)
- No. of graves: 195
- Find a Grave: British Garrison Cemetery

Designations

Archaeological Protected Monument of Sri Lanka
- Designated: 22 July 2011

British Garrison Cemetery (also known as the Kandy Garrison Cemetery) is a British cemetery in Kandy, Sri Lanka, for British nationals who died in Ceylon. It was established in 1817 just after British captured the Kingdom of Kandy and closed in 1873 due to a ban on burials within the municipal limits, although special provision was given to allow the burial of relatives of those interred in the cemetery, with last person buried there being Annie Fritz in 1951. The cemetery contains 195 graves of men, women and children. The most common causes of death were tropical diseases such as malaria and cholera.

The cemetery was restored in 1998 using financial contributions from the Commonwealth War Graves Commission and is currently maintained by a group called 'The Friends of the British Garrison Cemetery in Kandy'. The cemetery, located on the land of the Sri Dalada Maligawa Buddhist temple, is maintained by the British while the Diyawadana Nilame and the Chief Prelates maintain the land.

On 22 July 2011 it was declared an Archaeological Protected Monument by the government.

Charles, Prince of Wales (now King Charles III) made a visit to the graves in November 2013.

== Notable graves ==
- Sir John D’Oyly (1774–1824), a British colonial administrator and responsible for drafting the Kandyan Convention of 1815, which resulted in the British takeover of the Kandyan Kingdom.
- Lady Elizabeth Gregory (1817–1873), the first wife of William Henry Gregory, Governor of Ceylon (1872–1877).
- John Spottiswood Robertson (1823–1856), the seventh and last recorded death of a European in Ceylon killed by wild elephants.
- William Robert Lyte (1846–1865), grandson of the Rev. Henry Francis Lyte, author of the hymn "Abide with Me"

== See also ==
- Kandy War Cemetery
