= Executive Council of Ceylon =

The Executive Council of Ceylon was the executive council created in Ceylon (now Sri Lanka) by the British colonial administration on the recommendations of the Colebrooke-Cameron Commission along with the Legislative Council of Ceylon in March 1833.

== History ==
The 1833 Colebrooke-Cameron Commission recommended the creation of the Legislative Council and the Executive Council, the first step in representative government in British Ceylon. Accordingly, both were established on 19 March 1833 by letters patent. The Executive Council initially consisted of the British Governor (the president of the council) and five other senior British officials: the General Officer Commanding, the Colonial Secretary (Principal Secretary), the Kings's Advocate, the Treasurer and the Government Agent for the Central Province. The Council also included unofficial representation for the Sinhalese, Europeans, Tamils and Burghers. The governor had to consult the Executive Council in the discharge of his duties but he could over rule the council's advice.

In 1840 the Auditor-General replaced the Government Agent for the Central Province on the council and in 1883 the Queen's Advocate post was renamed Attorney General. The Second Manning Reforms of 1924 added four unofficial members to the Executive Council.

The 1927-8 Donoughmore Commission recommended that Ceylon be given limited self-government and the replacement of the Legislative Council and Executive Council with the State Council and Board of Ministers respectively. This was in order to make Ceylon more democratic and give the people more representation. Accordingly, the Executive Council was abolished in 1931.
