= British Cemetery =

British Cemetery may refer to

== Europe ==
- Buttes New British Cemetery, Belgium
- Messines Ridge British Cemetery, Belgium
- Poelcapelle British Cemetery, Belgium
- Ancre British Cemetery, France
- Contay British Cemetery, France
- Mikra British Cemetery, Greece
- British Cemetery of Funchal, Madeira, Portugal
- British Cemetery Elvas, Portugal
- British Cemetery, Lisbon, Portugal
- Bilbao British Cemetery, Spain
- British Cemetery in Madrid, Spain
- English Cemetery, Spain

== South America ==
- Cementerio Británico, Buenos Aires, Argentina
- Cemitério dos Ingleses, Gamboa, Rio de Janeiro, Brazil
- Cemitério dos Ingleses, Recife, Brazil
- British Cemetery of Bahia, Salvador, Brazil
- Recoleta Cemetery, Asuncion, Paraguay - section of cemetery known as British Cemetery
- British Cemetery, Callao, Peru
- The British Cemetery Montevideo, Uruguay

== Asia ==
Afghanistan

- British Cemetery, Kabul, Afghanistan

Bangladesh

- Chittagong War Cemetery, Chittagong
- Mainamati War Cemetery, Comilla

India

- British Cemetery, Chunar, Uttar Pradesh
- British Cemetery, Cossimbazar, West Bengal
- British Cemetery, Golaghat, Assam
- Khejuri British Cemetery, West Bengal
- British Cemetery in Panjim (Goa), Goa
- British Cemetery, Surat, Gujarat
- Delhi War Cemetery, Delhi
- Madras War Cemetery, Madras, Tamil Nadu

Malaysia

- Alor Gajah British Graveyard, Malacca

Pakistan

- Old British Cemetery, Gilgit, Gilgit-Baltistan
- Karachi War Cemetery, Karachi
- Rawalpindi War Cemetery, Rawalpindi

Sri Lanka

- British Garrison Cemetery, Kandy
- Kandy War Cemetery, Kandy
- Liveramentu Cemetery, Colombo
- Trincomalee British War Cemetery, Trincomalee

Thailand

- Kanchanaburi War Cemetery, Kanchanaburi

== See also ==
- British Association for Cemeteries in South Asia
- English Cemetery (disambiguation)
