= Protestant Cemetery =

Protestant Cemetery may refer to:

- Protestant Cemetery, São Paulo, Brazil
- Old Protestant Cemetery (Macau), China
- Protestant Cemetery, Bordeaux, France
- Protestant Cemetery, Montpellier, France
- Mount Zion Cemetery, Jerusalem, Israel
- Protestant Cemetery, Rome, Italy
- Protestant Cemetery, Vilnius, Lithuania

== See also ==
- British Cemetery
