= English Cemetery =

English Cemetery may refer to:

- English Cemetery, Florence, Italy
- English Cemetery, Naples, Italy
- British Cemetery, Elvas, Portugal
- English Cemetery, Málaga, Spain

== See also ==
- British Cemetery (disambiguation)
