= Nick Lipscombe =

British military historian

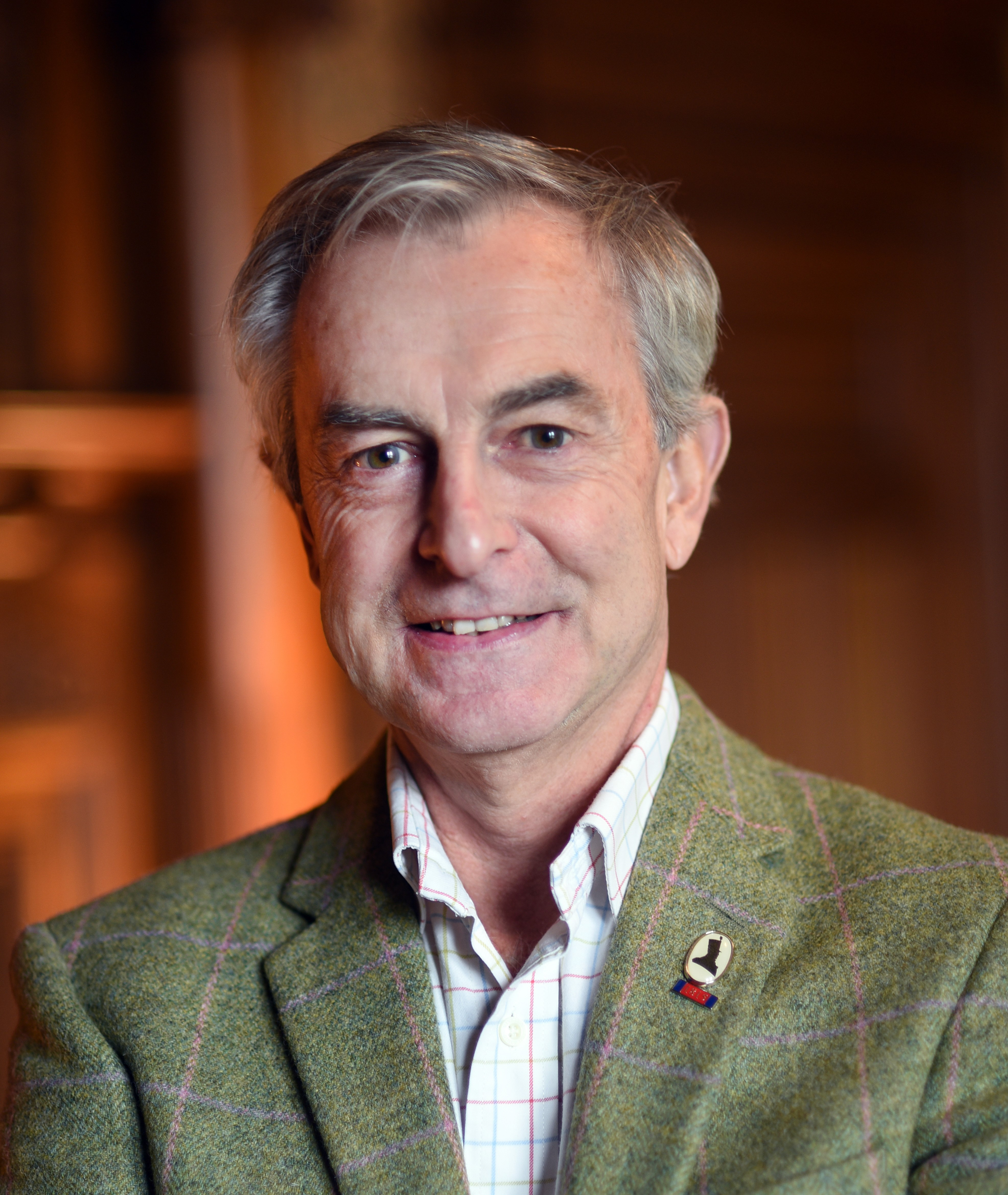
- Nick Lipscombe in 2014
- Born: Nicolas John Lipscombe; 5 June 1958; Angers, France
- Education: St Peter’s RC School; Royal Military Academy Sandhurst
- Occupations: Historian/author/lecturer/ university tutor
- Employer: University of Oxford
- Notable work: Napoleonic Wars; Peninsular War
- Military career
- Allegiance: United Kingdom
- Branch: British Army
- Service years: 1979–2013
- Rank: Colonel
- Unit: Royal Regiment of Artillery
- Awards: United States Bronze Star Medal
- Website: official website

Colonel Nicolas John Lipscombe FRHistS (born 5 June 1958 in Angers, France) is a British historian, author, tour guide, lecturer and university tutor.

== Military career ==
Lipscombe was commissioned into the Royal Regiment of Artillery in 1981 following his military and academic training at the Royal Military Academy Sandhurst where he was awarded the Tombs Benson Memorial Scholarship. During his 34 years of military service in the British Army he spent most of his career abroad and/or on operations. He was awarded the United States Bronze Star Medal in 2006 in recognition of services during coalition operations in Iraq.

== Academic career ==
Lipscombe was educated at St. Peter's Catholic School, Bournemouth. In 1990 he obtained his Master of Science degree from Cranfield University, Shrivenham and the Indian Defence Services Staff College.

He is the author of a number of historical works that are best categorised as military history from the seventeenth through to the nineteenth centuries. Having lived and worked for 7.5 years in the location, he is recognised as a world authority on the battles and battlefields of the Iberian Peninsula and Southern France. Andrew Roberts selected the Peninsular War Atlas as one of the Daily Telegraph (History) Books of the Year in November 2010. Lipscombe edited (and contributed to) the official Waterloo 200 book, Waterloo, The Decisive Victory compiled to commemorate the Bicentenary of the Battle of Waterloo.

Lipscombe was chairman of Peninsular War 200 (now dissolved), the official organisation established in 2008 to commemorate the bicentenaries of the battles and sieges of the Peninsular War 1808–1814. The organisation worked for both the UK Ministry of Defence and the Foreign and Commonwealth Office and in conjunction with Waterloo 200 and the civil and military authorities in Spain, France and Portugal. He is a trustee of the British Cemetery at Elvas, Portugal.

In 2015 Lipscombe was an advisor and presenter on the BBC documentary on Wellington: The Iron Duke Unmasked.

He was elected a fellow of the Royal Historical Society in 2015. He has been a tutor at the University of Oxford’s Department of Continuing Education since 2017. Having been a member of the British Commission for Military History for a number of years, Lipscombe joined the Committee in 2018.

== Bibliography ==
- The Peninsular War Atlas, (Osprey Publishing, Revised Edition 2014) ISBN 978-1472807731
- Wellington’s Guns, (Osprey Publishing, 2013) ISBN 978-1780961149
- Bayonne & Toulouse 1813-14, Wellington Invades France, (Osprey Publishing 2014) ISBN 978-1472802774
- Wellington’s Forgotten Front, (Gerard Books 2013) ISBN 978-0957545304
- Wellington’s Eastern Front, The Campaign on the East Coast of Spain 1810-1814, (Pen and Sword Books, 2016) ISBN 978-1473850712
- Waterloo, The Decisive Victory, (Osprey Publishing 2015) ISBN 978-1472801043
- The English Civil War, An Atlas and Concise History of the Wars of the Three Kingdoms 1639–51, (Osprey Publishing 2020) ISBN 978-1472829726
