= Chittagong War Cemetery =

CWGC cemetery in Chattogram, Bangladesh

Chittagong Commonwealth War Cemetery
- চট্টগ্রাম ওয়ার সিমেট্রি
- Commonwealth War Graves Commission
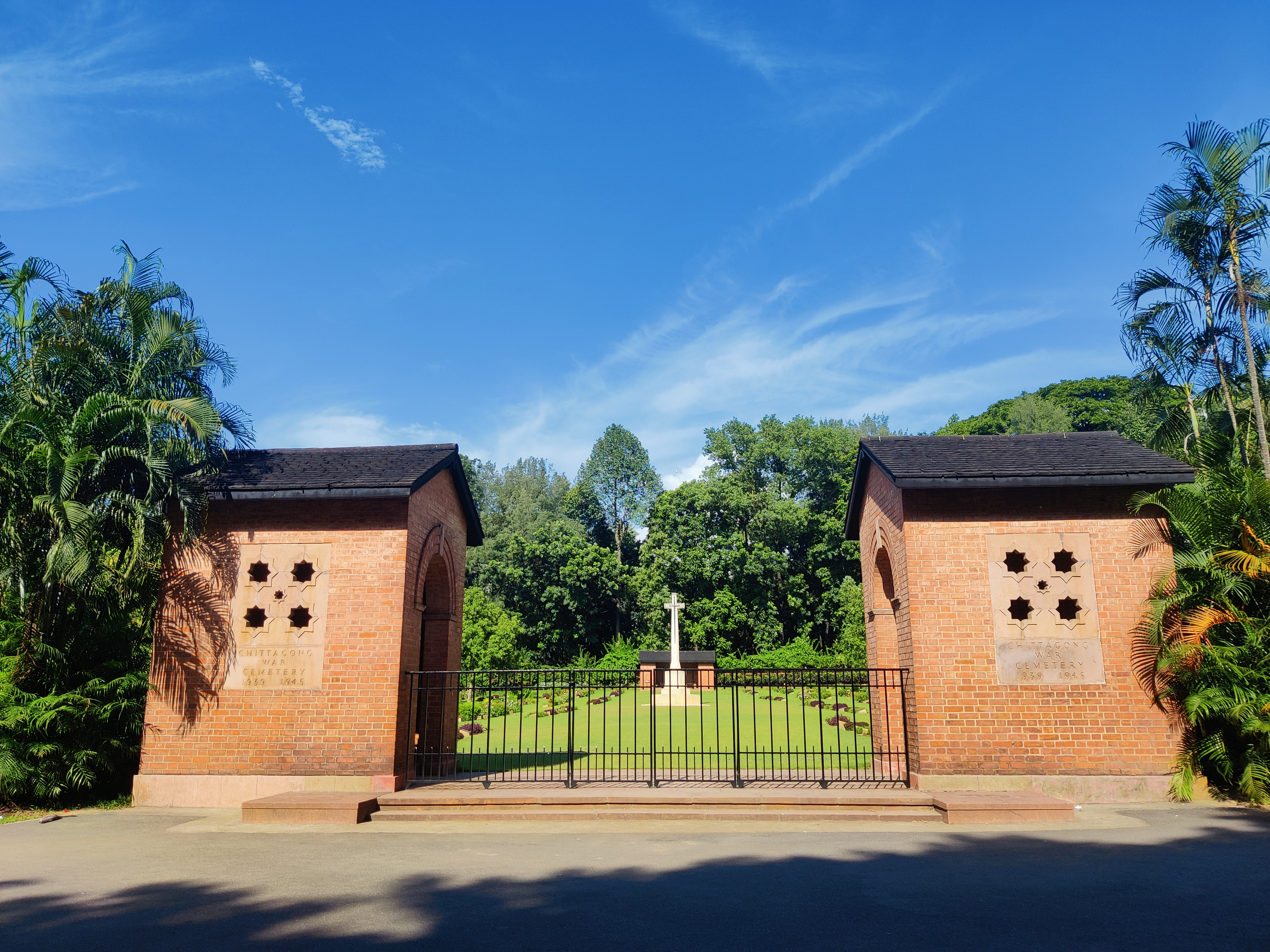
- Entrance
- Used for those deceased
- Established: After World War II (1939-1945)
- Location: 22.35730°N 91.82850°E; Badshah Miah Chowdhury Road, Chittagong
- Total burials: 715
- Unknowns: 17

Burials by nation
- United Kingdom – 471; British Raj – 207; Canada – 25; Australia – 9; New Zealand – 2; Netherlands – 1; Unknown – 17

Burials by war
- World War II

The Chittagong Commonwealth War Cemetery or Chittagong War Cemetery is a Commonwealth War Graves Commission cemetery in Chittagong, Bangladesh.

== History ==
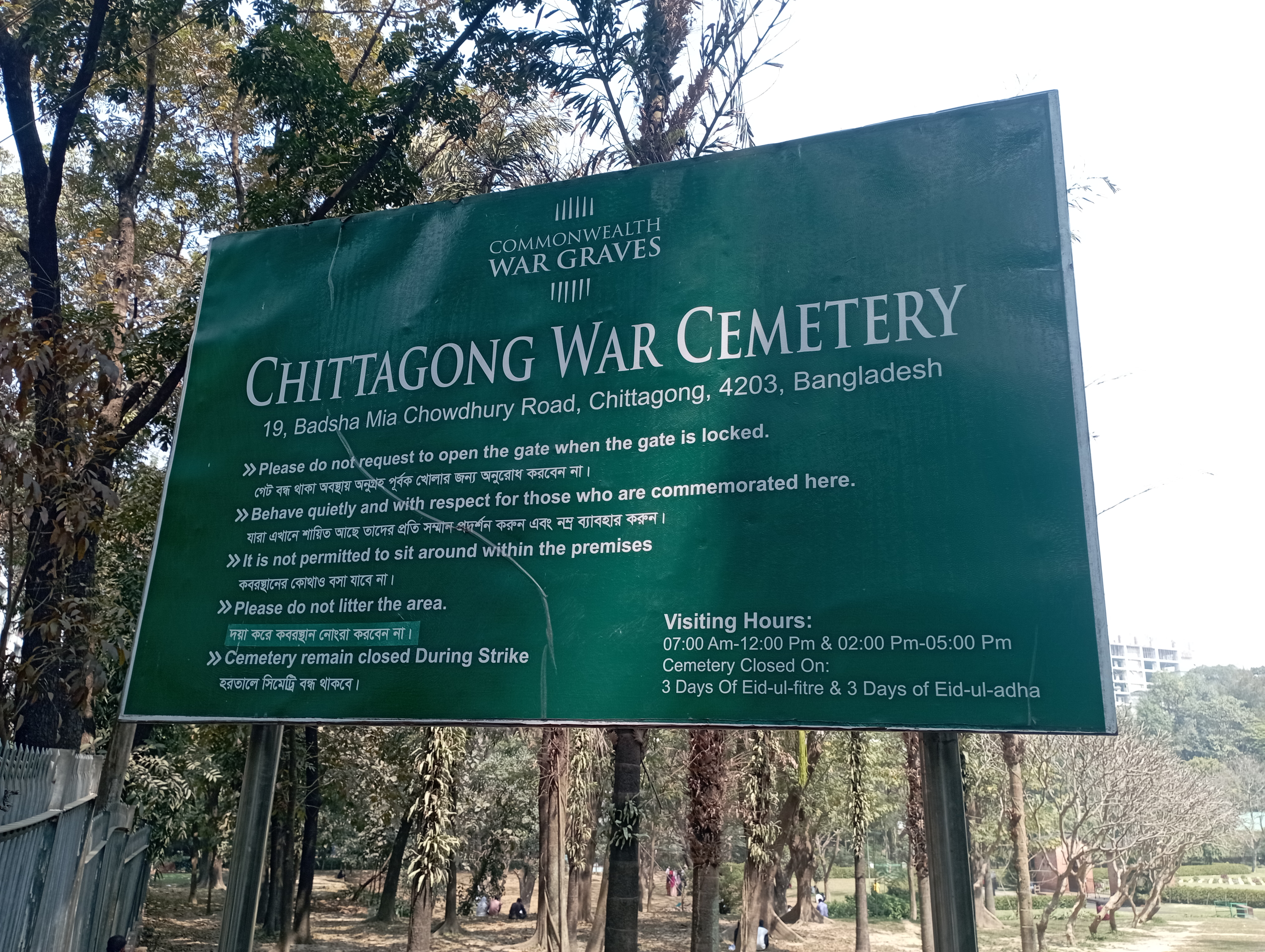

This cemetery was established to honor Commonwealth soldiers and others who died in World War II. The cemetery was created by the British Army, and there were originally about 400 burials. Graves have since been transferred to this cemetery from the Lushai Hills (Assam) and other isolated sites, and from Chittagong Civil Cemetery; Chandragona Baptist Mission Cemetery; Chiringa Military Cemetery; Cox's Bazar New Military and Civil (Muhammadan) Cemeteries; Chittagong (Panchalaish) Burial Ground; Dacca Military Cemetery; Demagiri Cemetery; Dhuapolong Muslim Burial Ground; Dhuapolong Christian Military Cemetery; Dohazari Military and R.A.F. Cemeteries; Jessore Protestant Cemetery; Khulna Cemetery; Khurushkul Island Christian and Muhammadan Cemeteries; Lungleh Cemetery (Assam); Nawapara Cemetery (Assam); Patiya Military Cemetery, Rangamati Cemetery; Tejgaon Roman Catholic Cemetery; Tumru Ghat Military Cemetery and Tumru M.D.S. Hospital Cemetery.

There are now 731 Commonwealth burials of the 1939-45 war here, 17 of which are unidentified.

There are a further 20 foreign national burials, 1 being a seaman of the Dutch Navy and 19 Japanese soldiers, 1 of which is unidentified. There are also 4 non-war U.K. military burials.

== Location ==
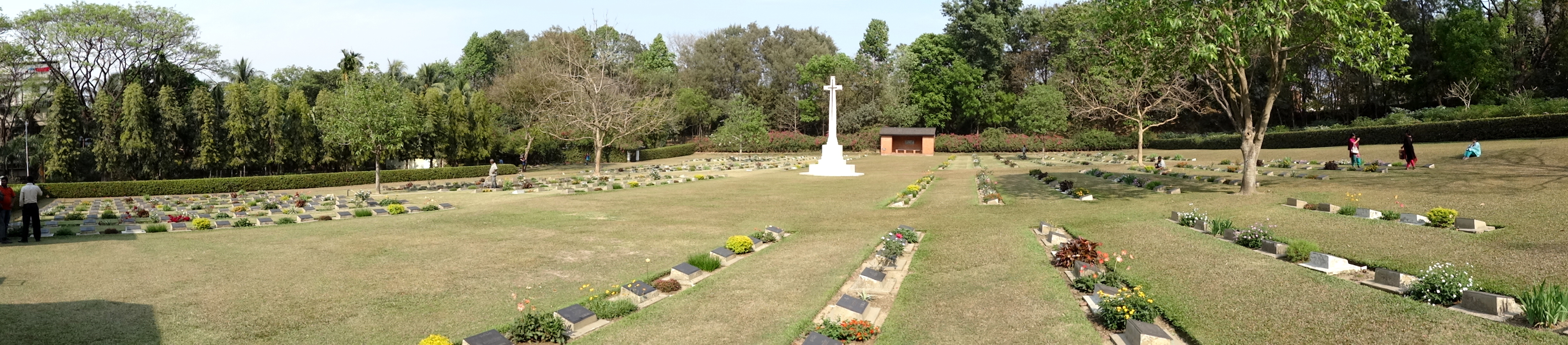
Panorama of the cemetery

Chittagong War Cemetery is located at Dampara, 19 Badsha Mia Road, 22 kilometers north of the airport and 8 kilometers from the port. The place which was formerly paddy fields, now then been developed. It is near the arts college and closes by Finlay's Guest Houses near Chatteshwari Road; a well-known road leading to the Chatteshwari Temple. There is no CWGC road direction sign.

The burial area is situated at the bottom of a slope directly behind Finlay's Guest Houses and is surrounded by a large area planted with a mixture of jungle trees, fruit trees, and flowering trees. A tarmac lane leads from the entrance gate to the burial area which is entered through a metal gate flanked by two small brick chapels.

== Burial details ==
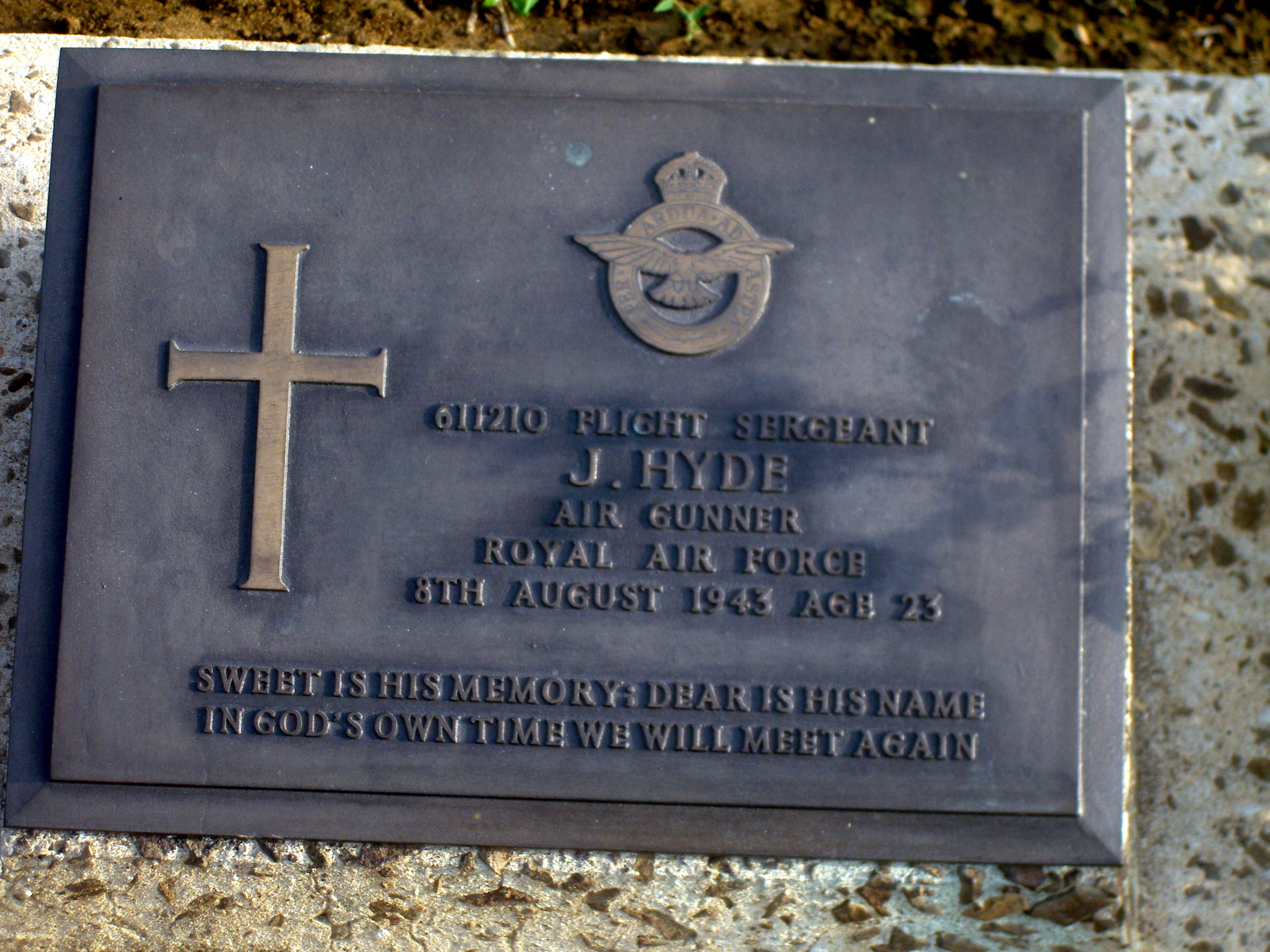
Burial of 611201 Flight sergeant J. Hyde, Royal Air Force

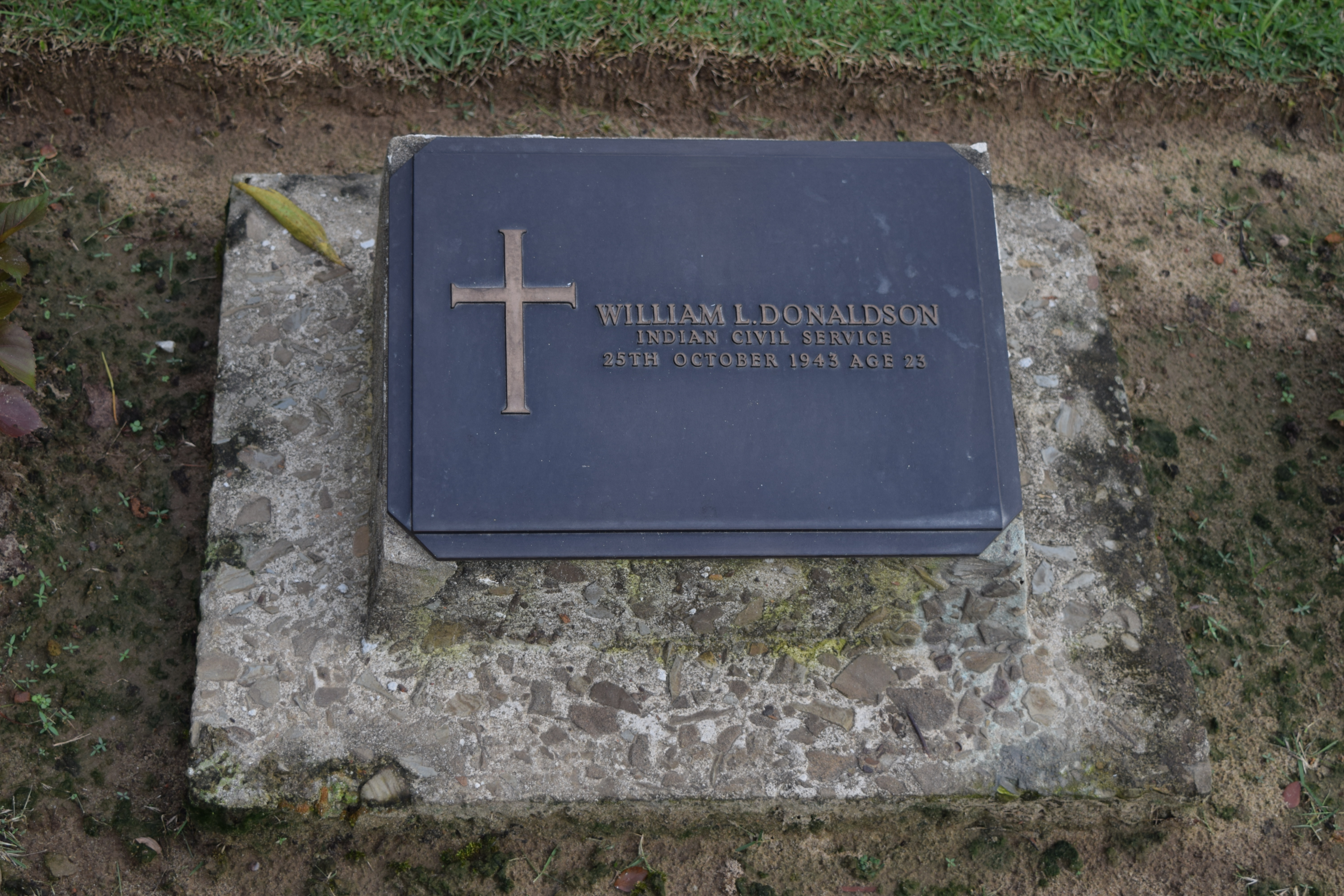
Burial of William L. Donaldson, Indian Civil Service

There are now 731 Commonwealth burials of the Second World War (1939–45) here, 17 of which are unidentified.

=== Burials by country ===
- United Kingdom – 471
- British Raj – 207
- Canada – 25
- Australia – 9
- New Zealand – 2
- Netherlands – 1
- Unknown – 18

Along with the commonwealth graves, there are graves of 20 more foreign nationals—19 Japanese soldiers and a Dutch Navy seaman.

== Gallery ==
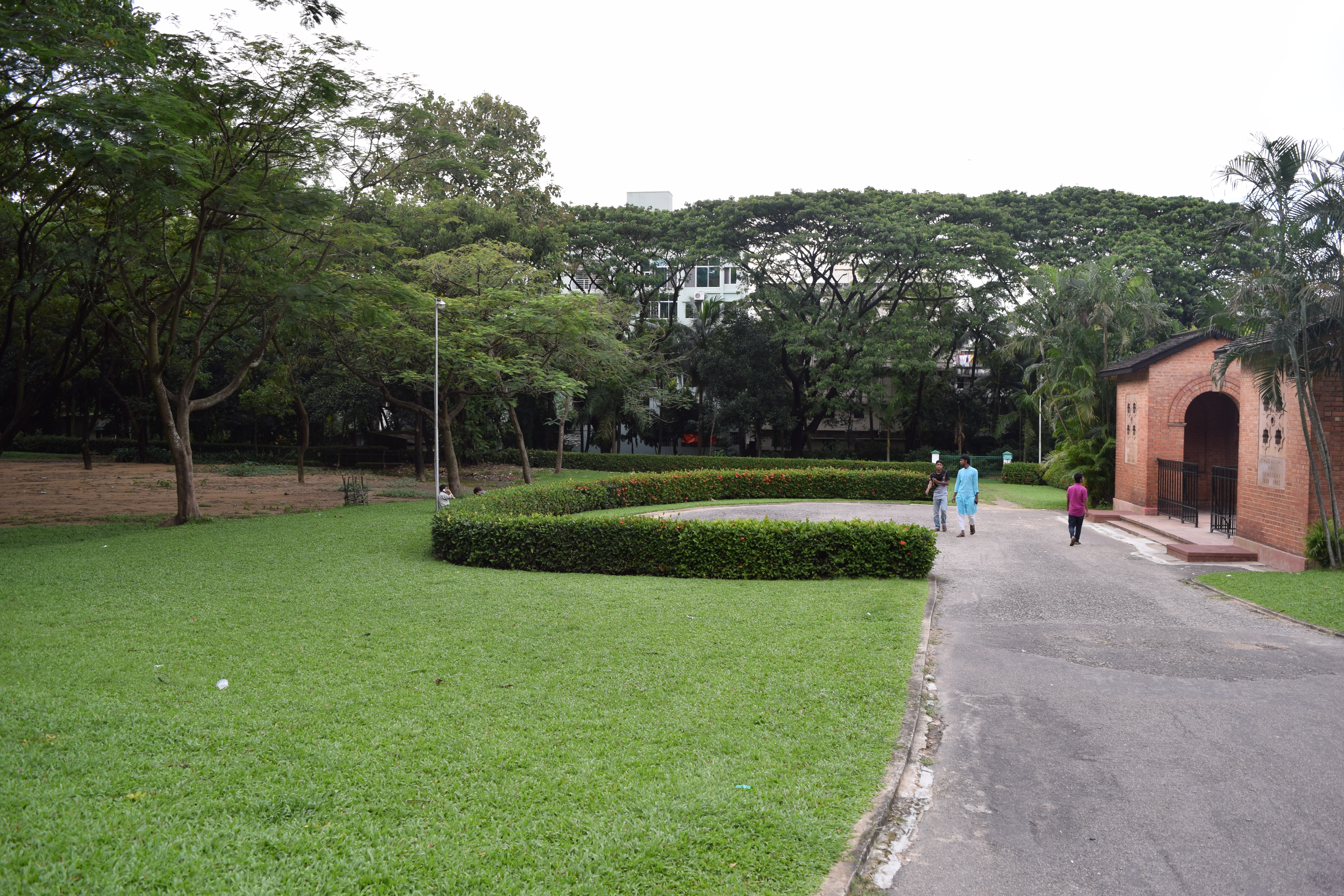
Entrance

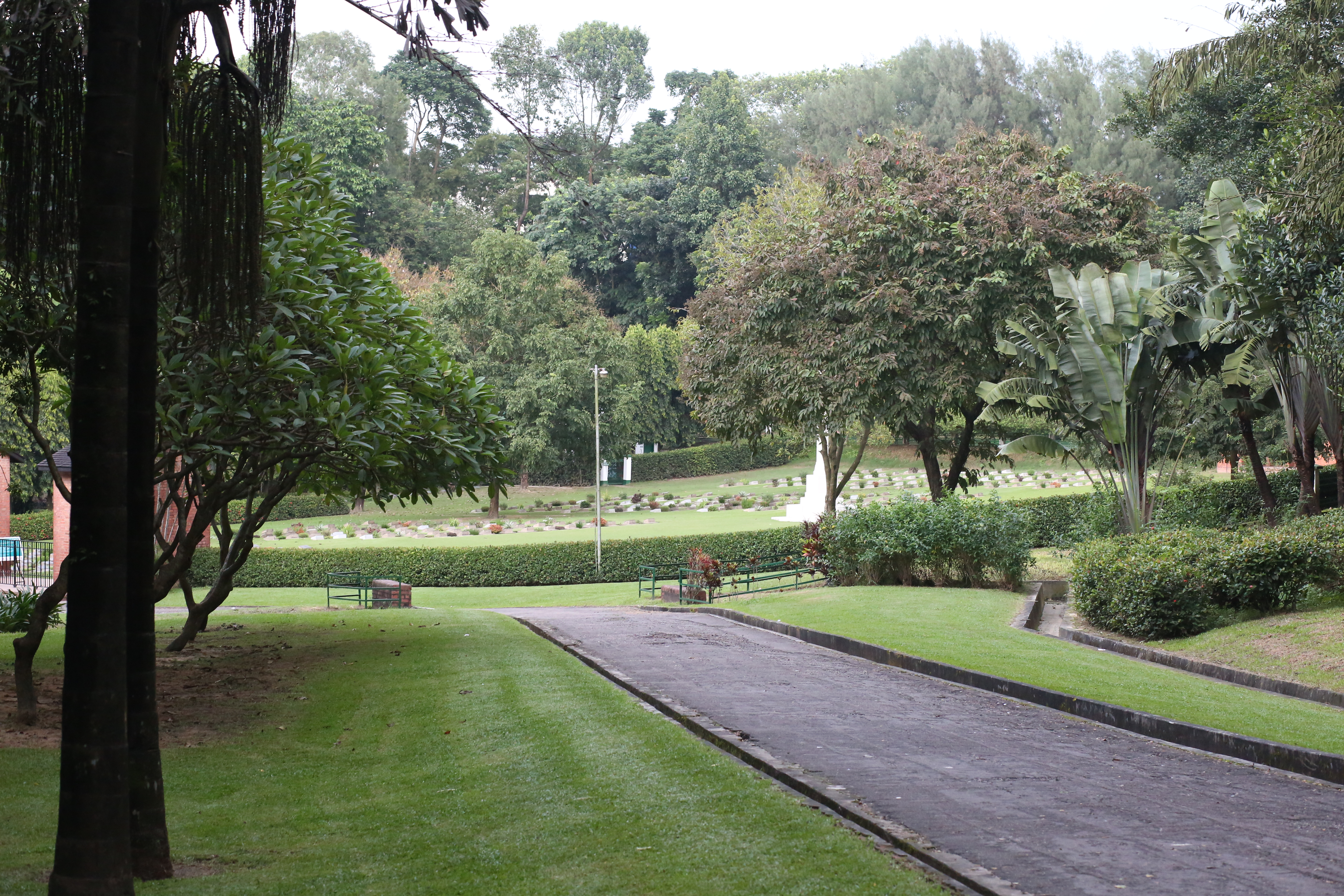
Entrance road

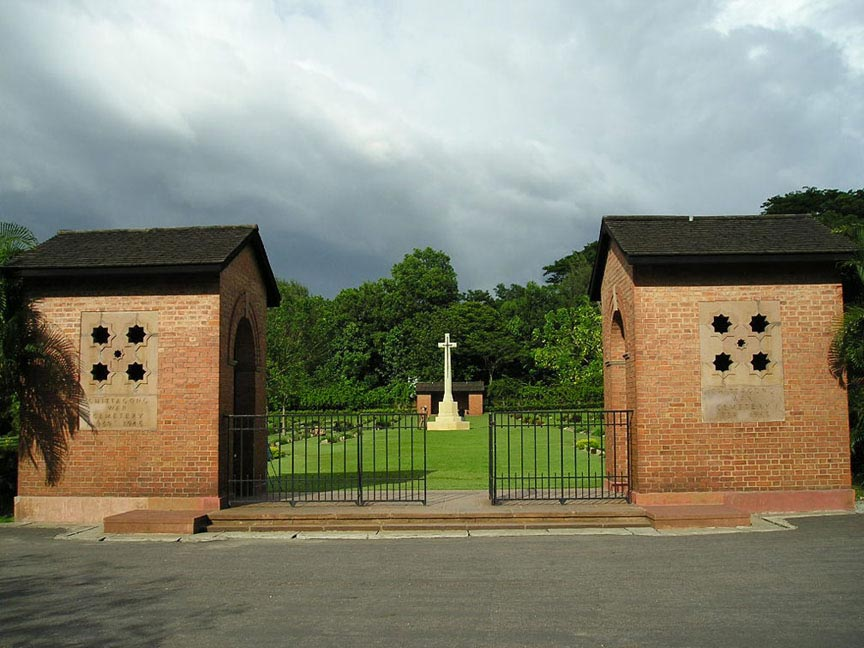
Portal of the cemetery

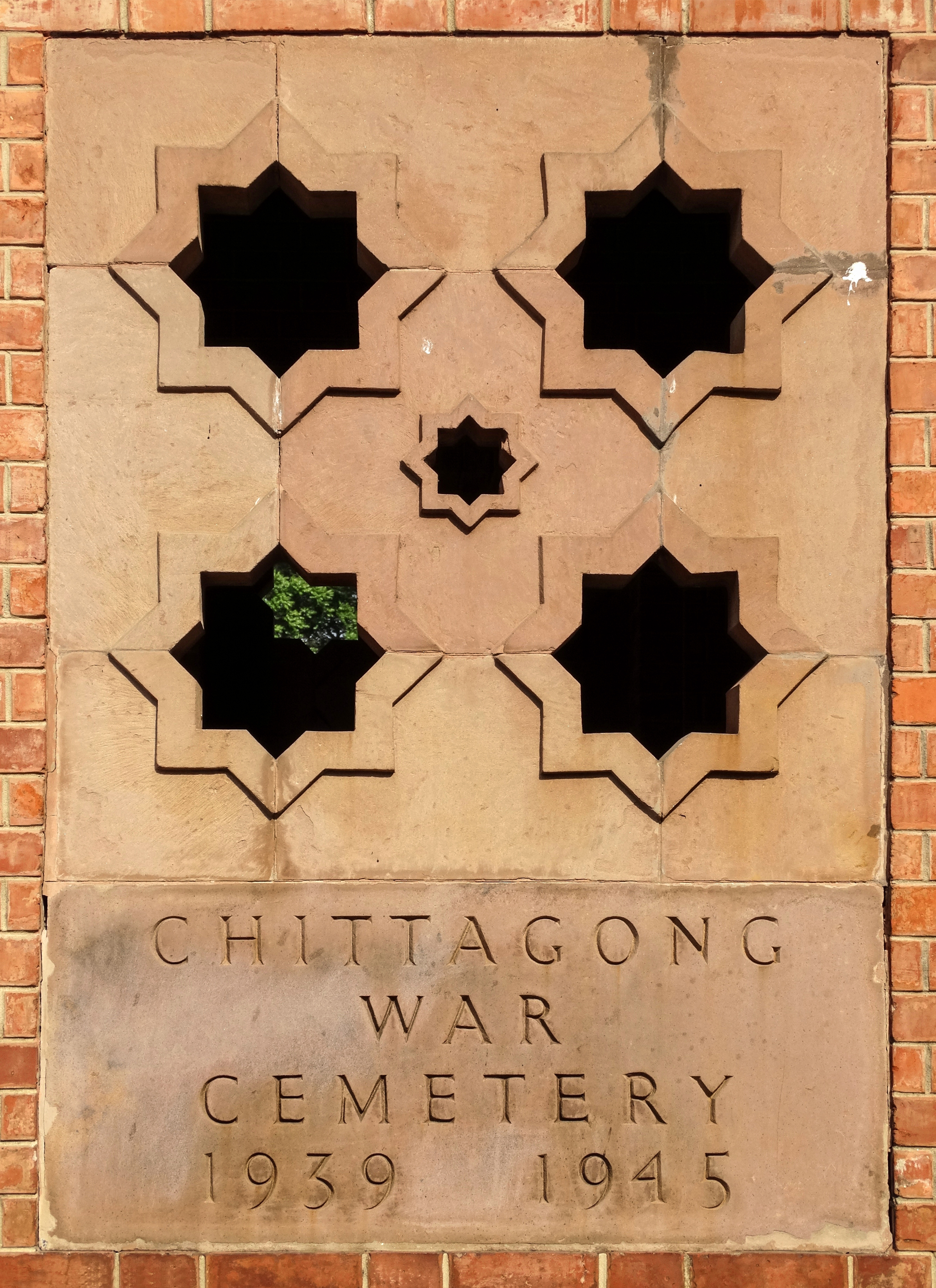
Plaque at entrance

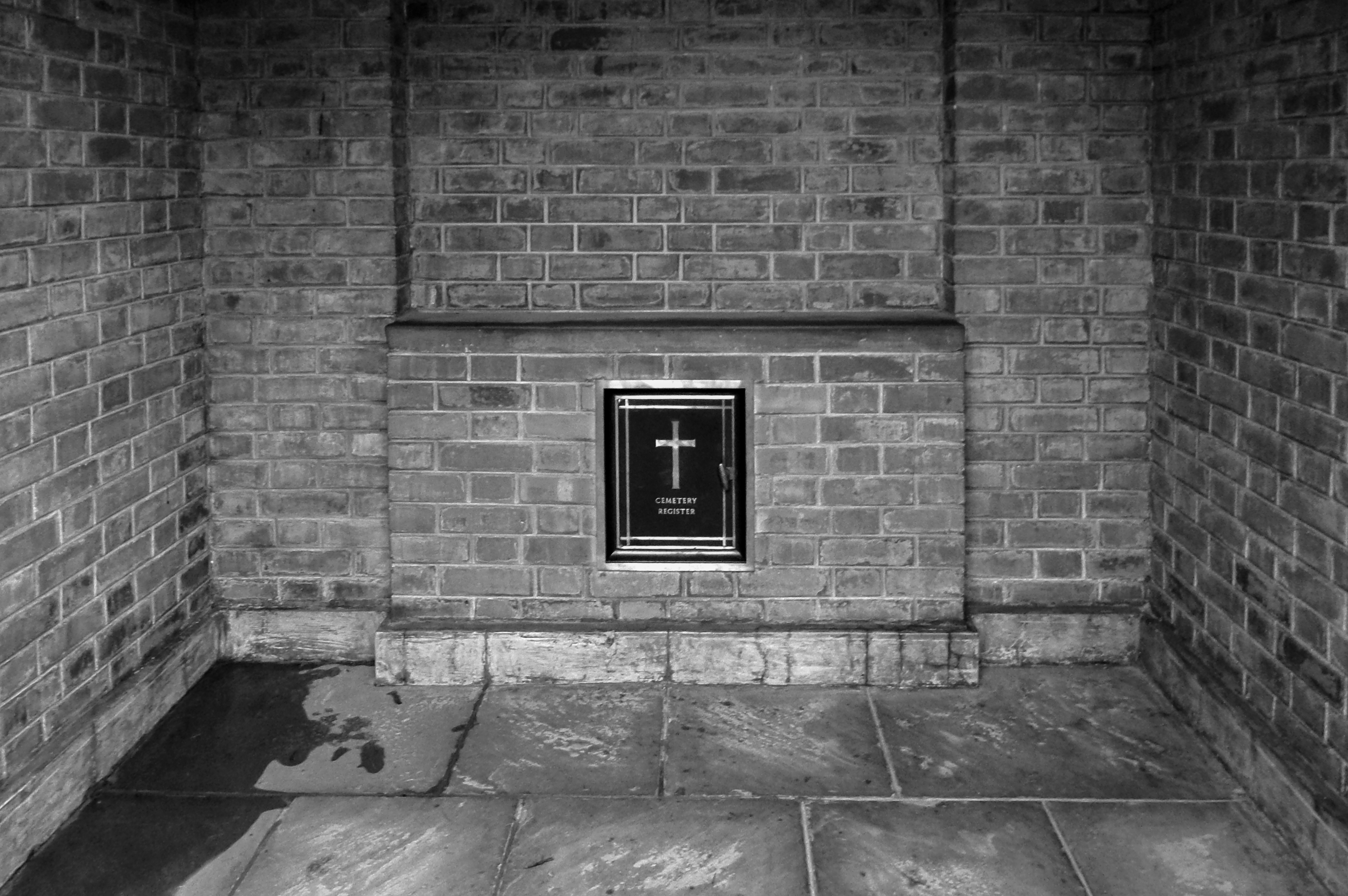
Cemetery Register

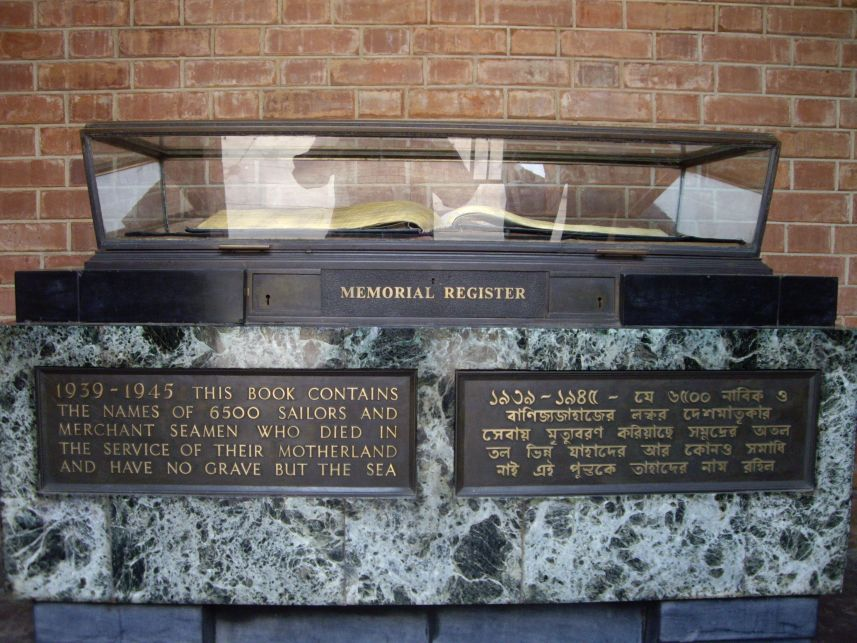
Memorial register

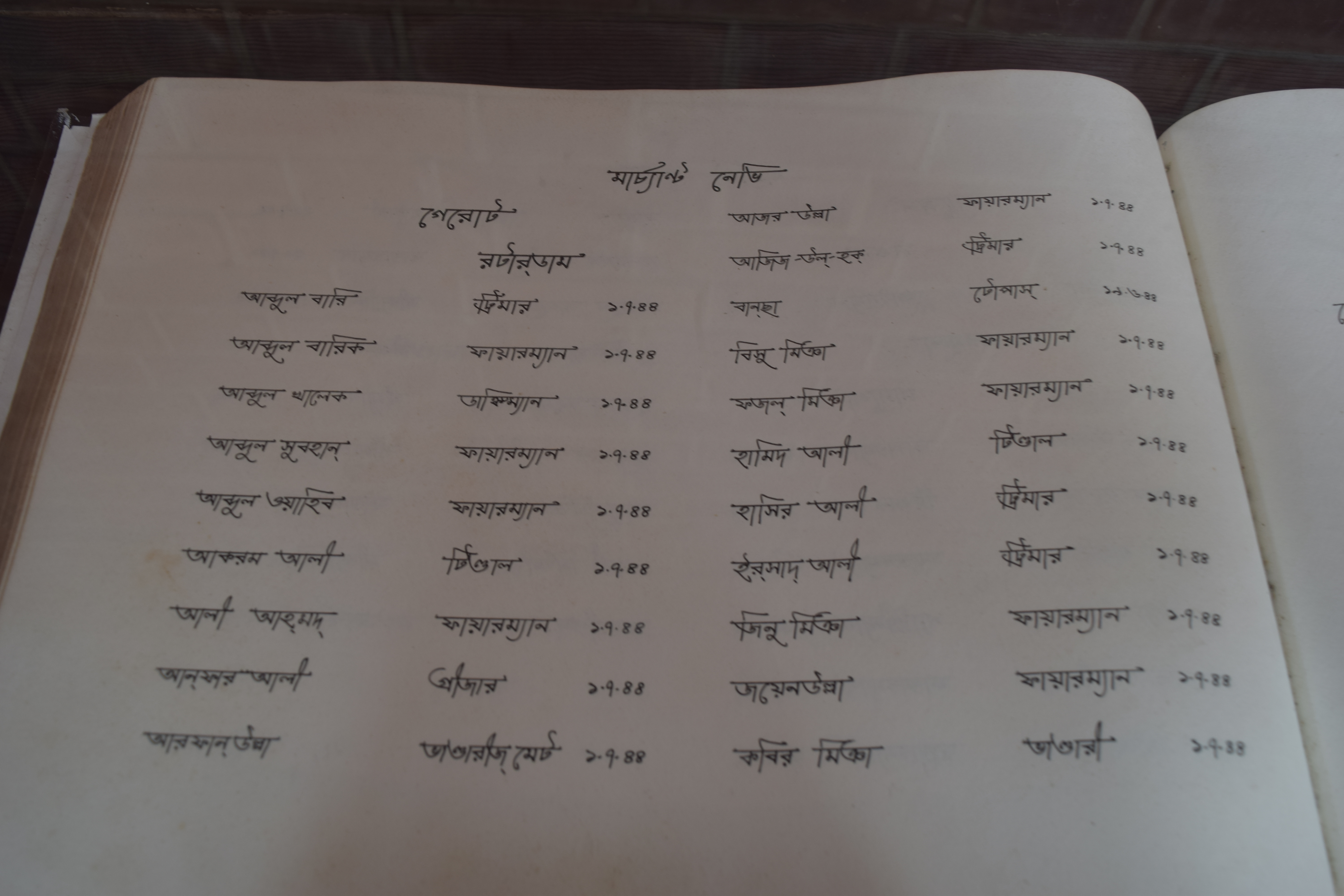
Page containing name of sailors and merchant seamen at the cemetery register

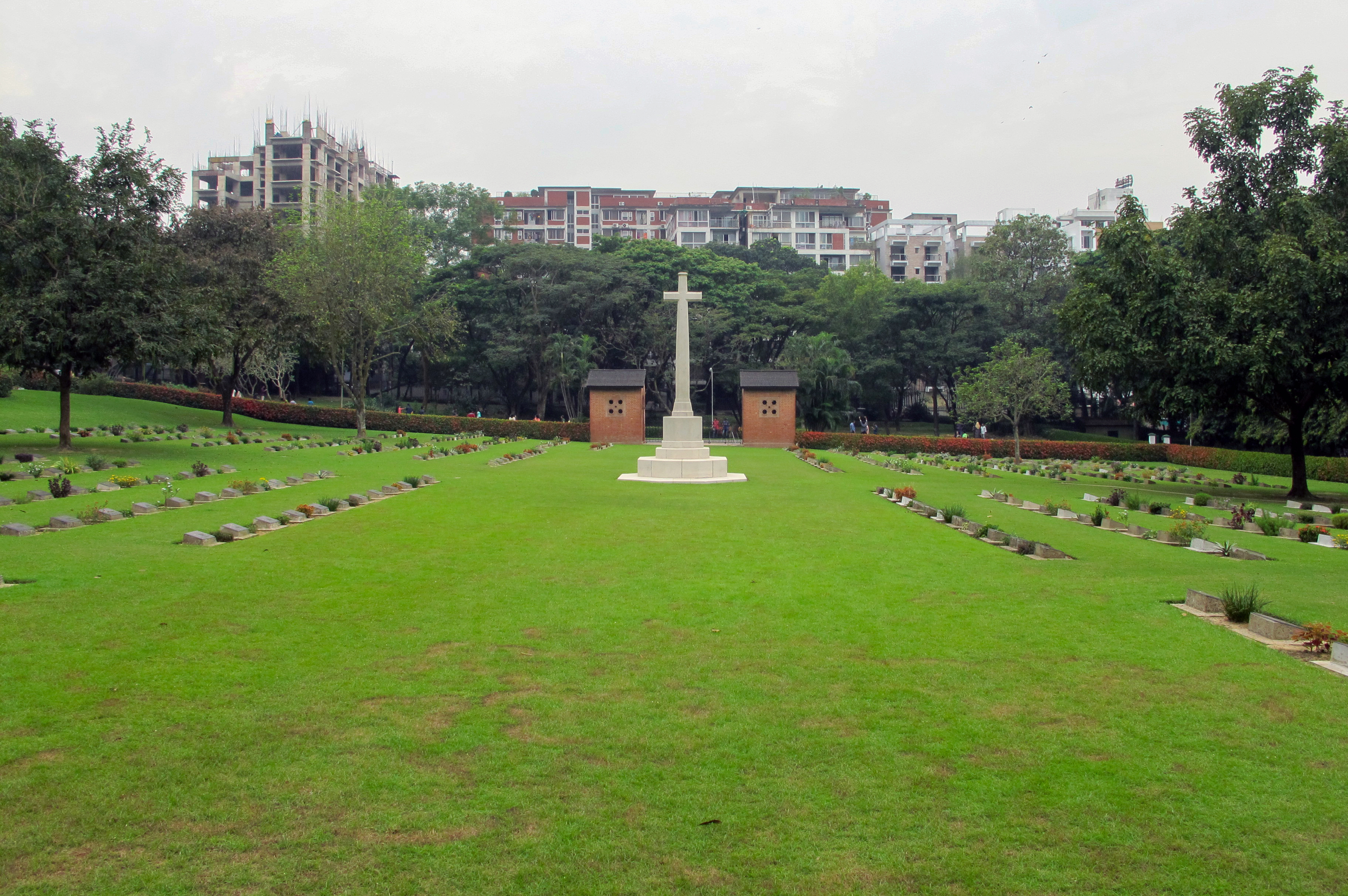
Burials and cross, font view

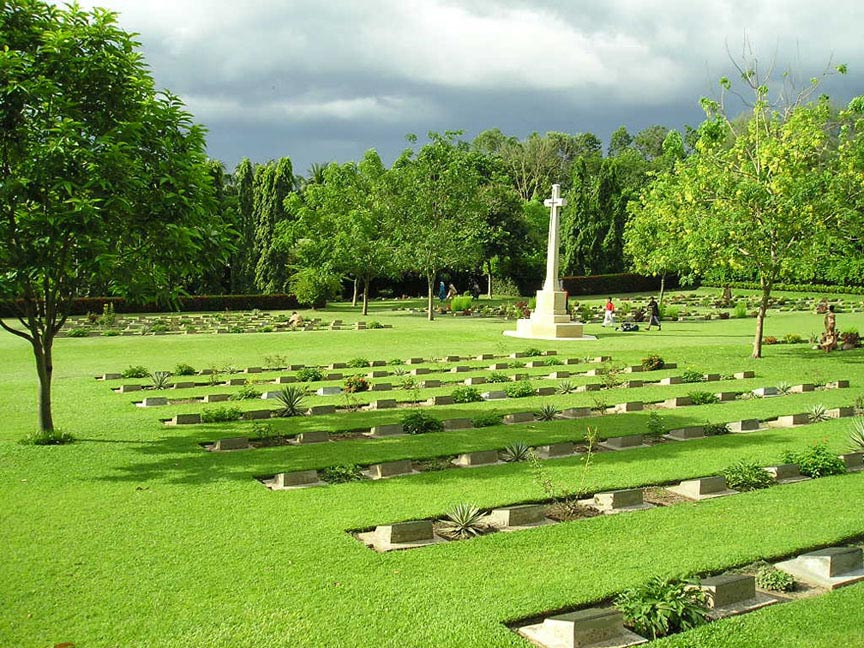
Burials and the Cross of Sacrifice

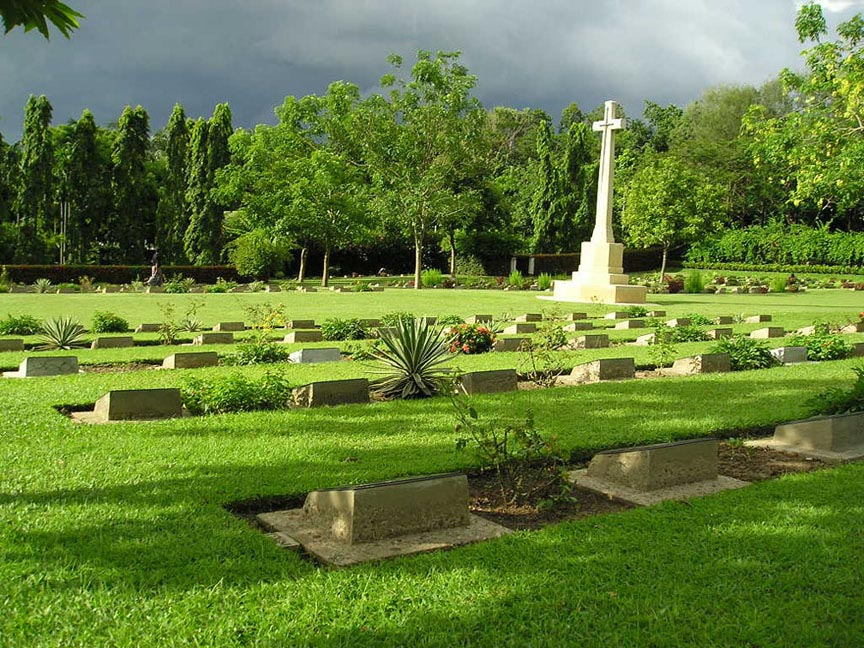
Burials and cross

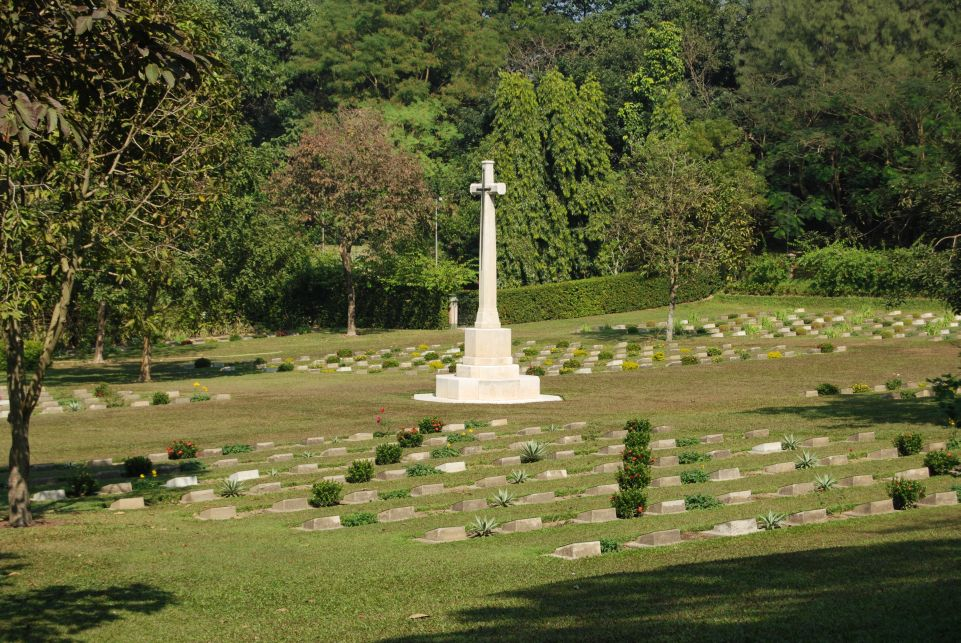
Burials, side view

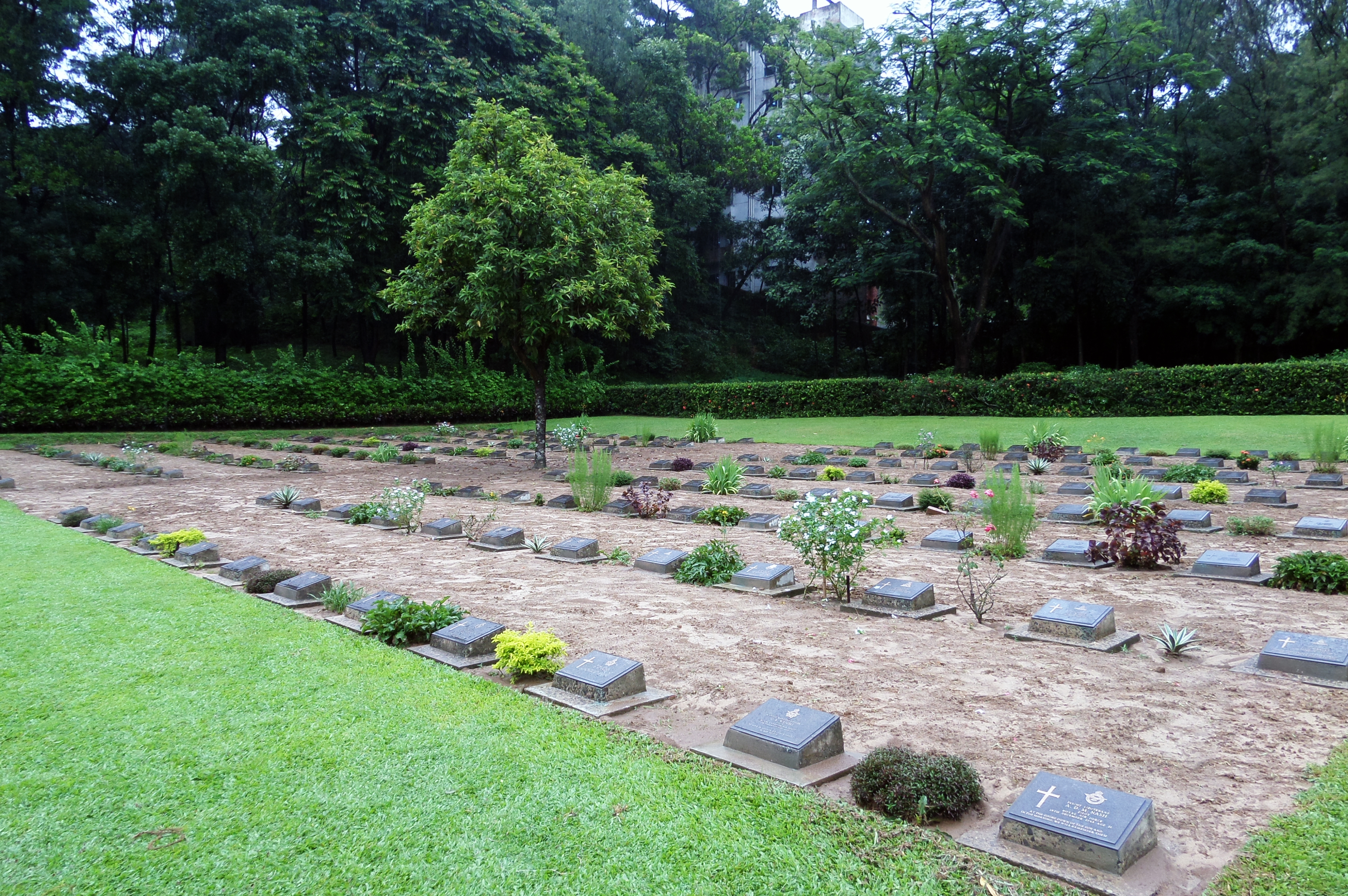
Burials and cross

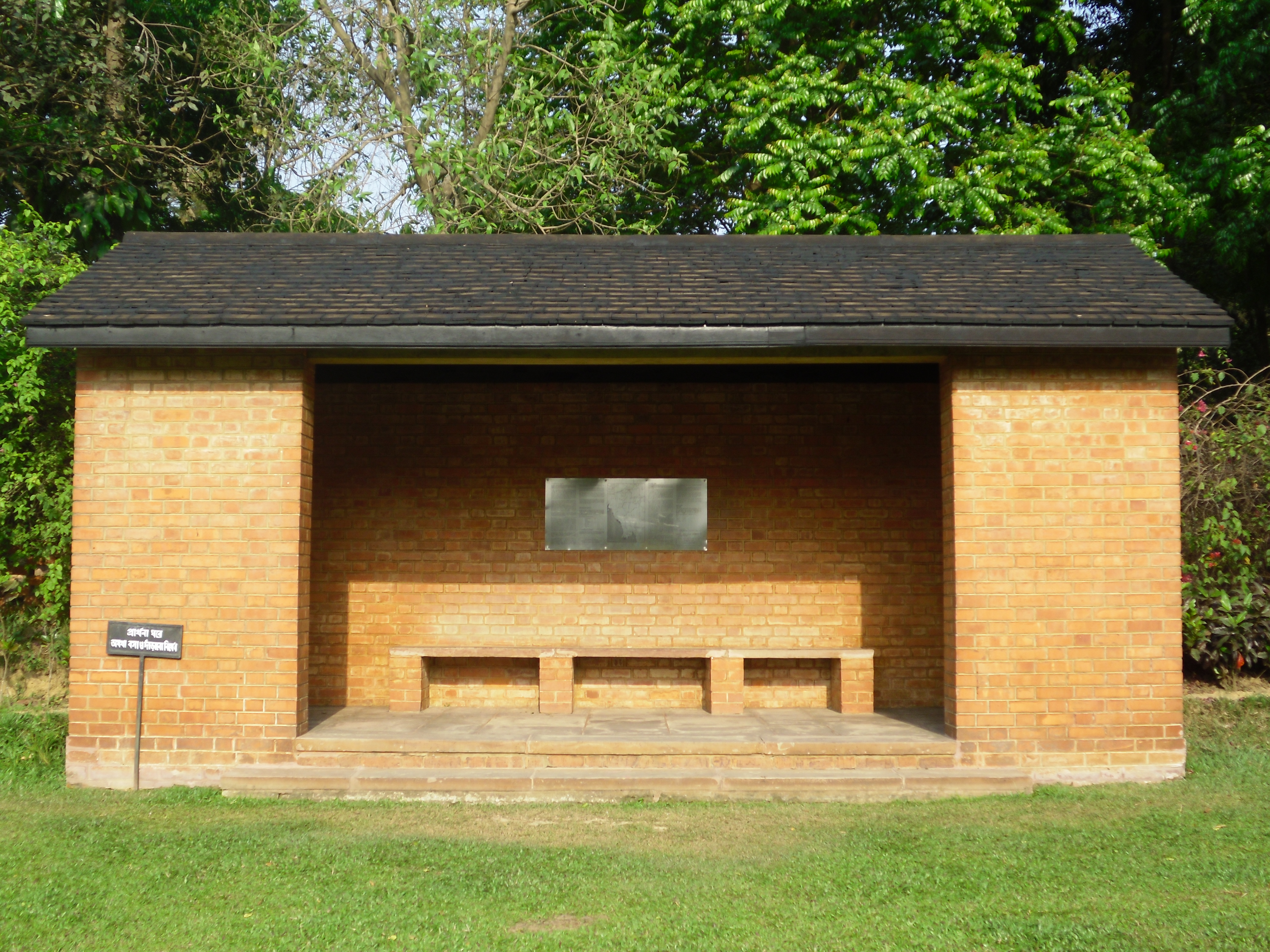
Prayer house

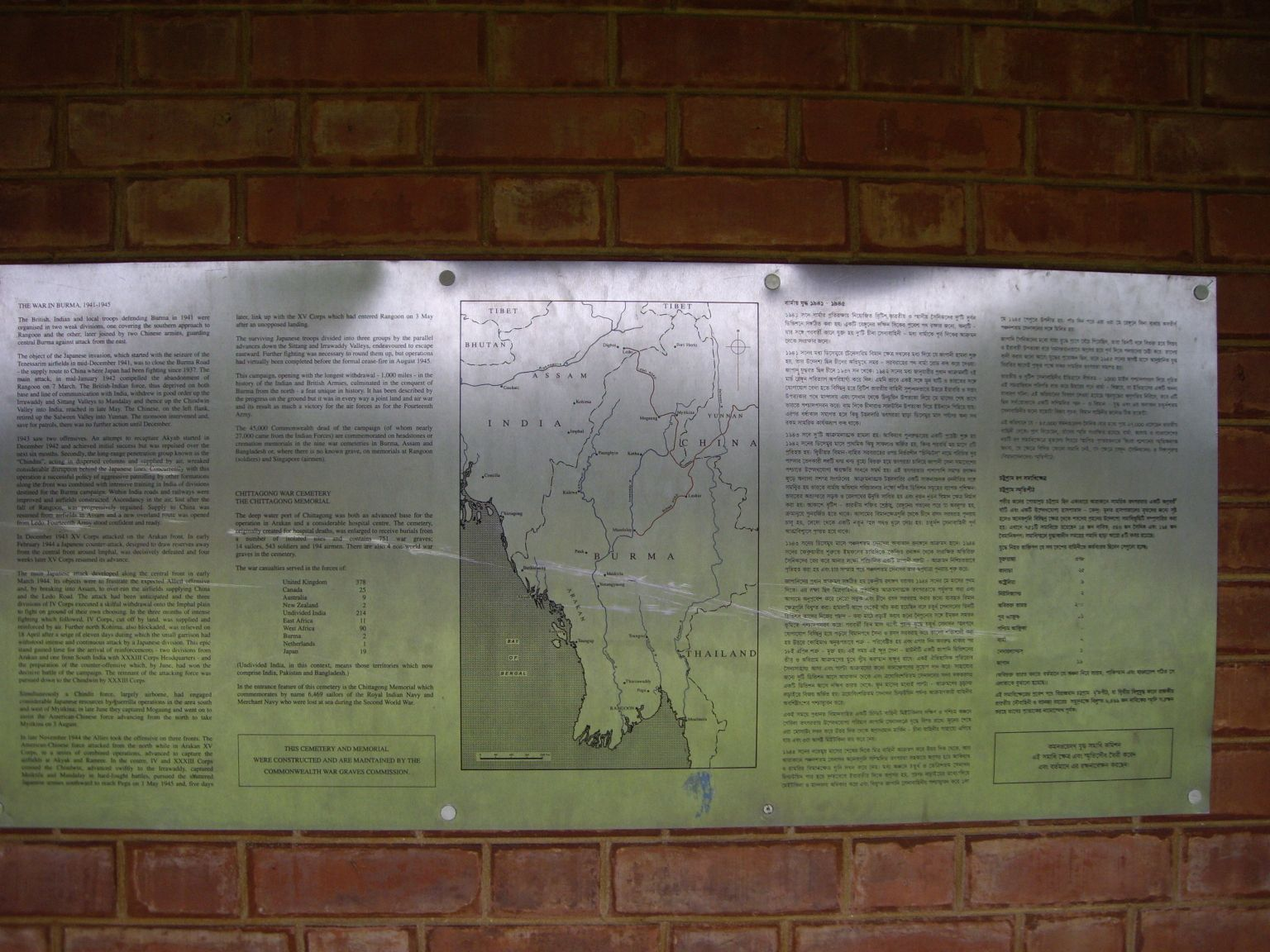
Description plaque at the cemetery prayer house

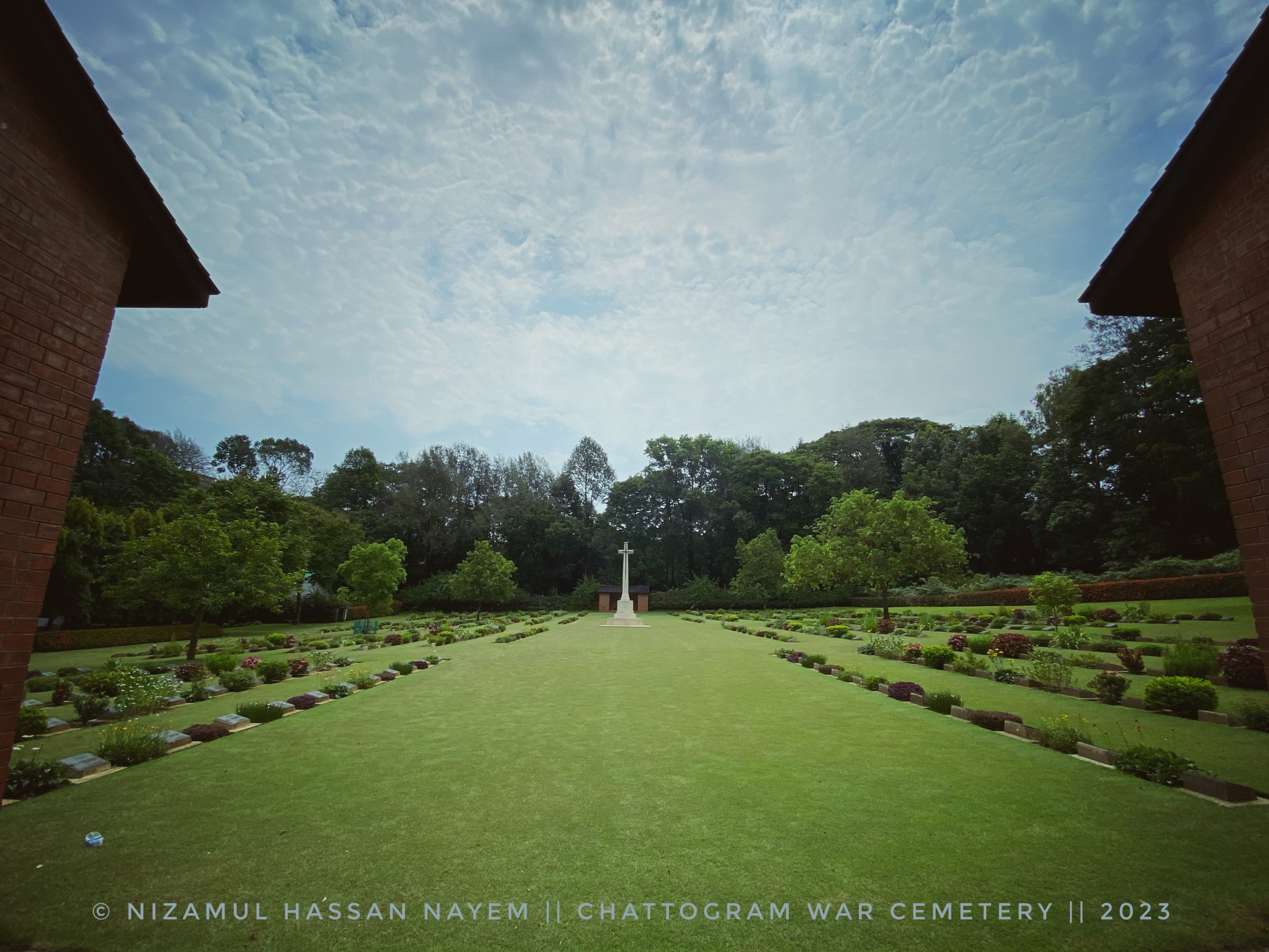
War Cemetery Entrance View

== See also ==
- Maynamati War Cemetery
