= Santo Amaro, Recife =

Coordinates: 8.046227°S 34.8786306°W

Santo Amaro
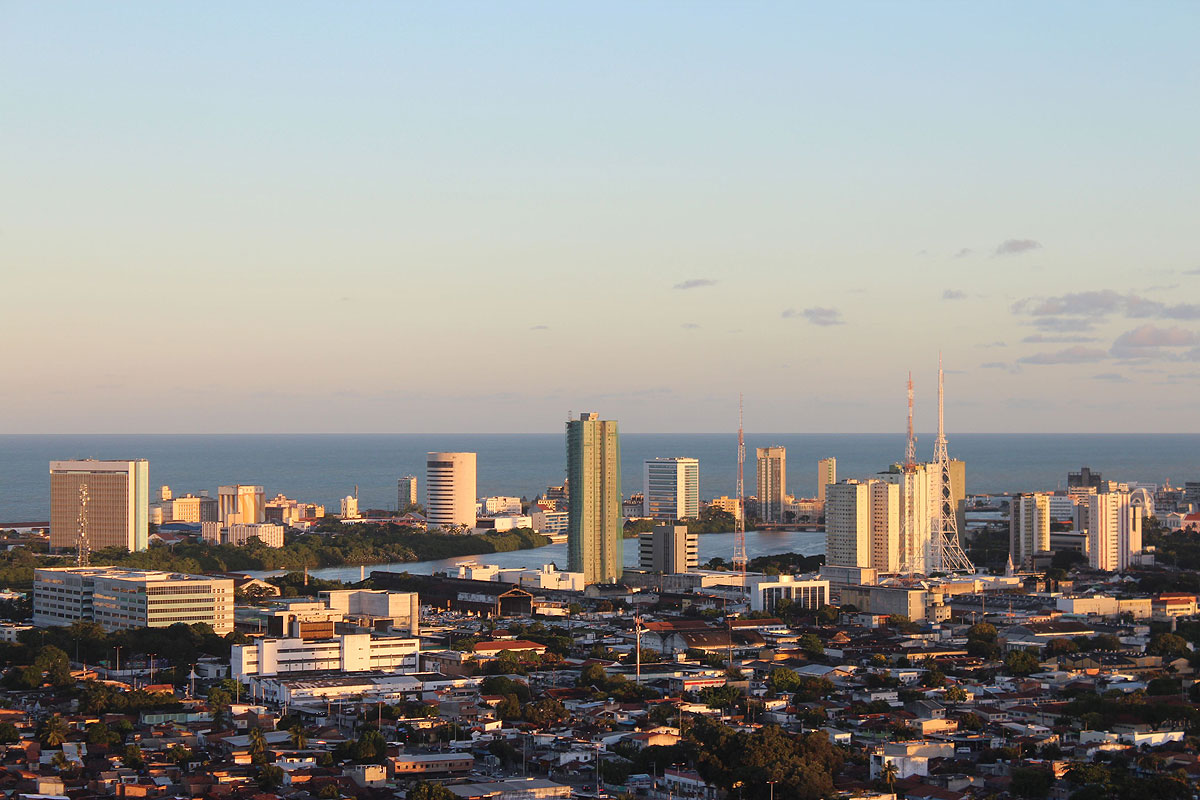
- Partial image of the city of Recife in Pernambuco

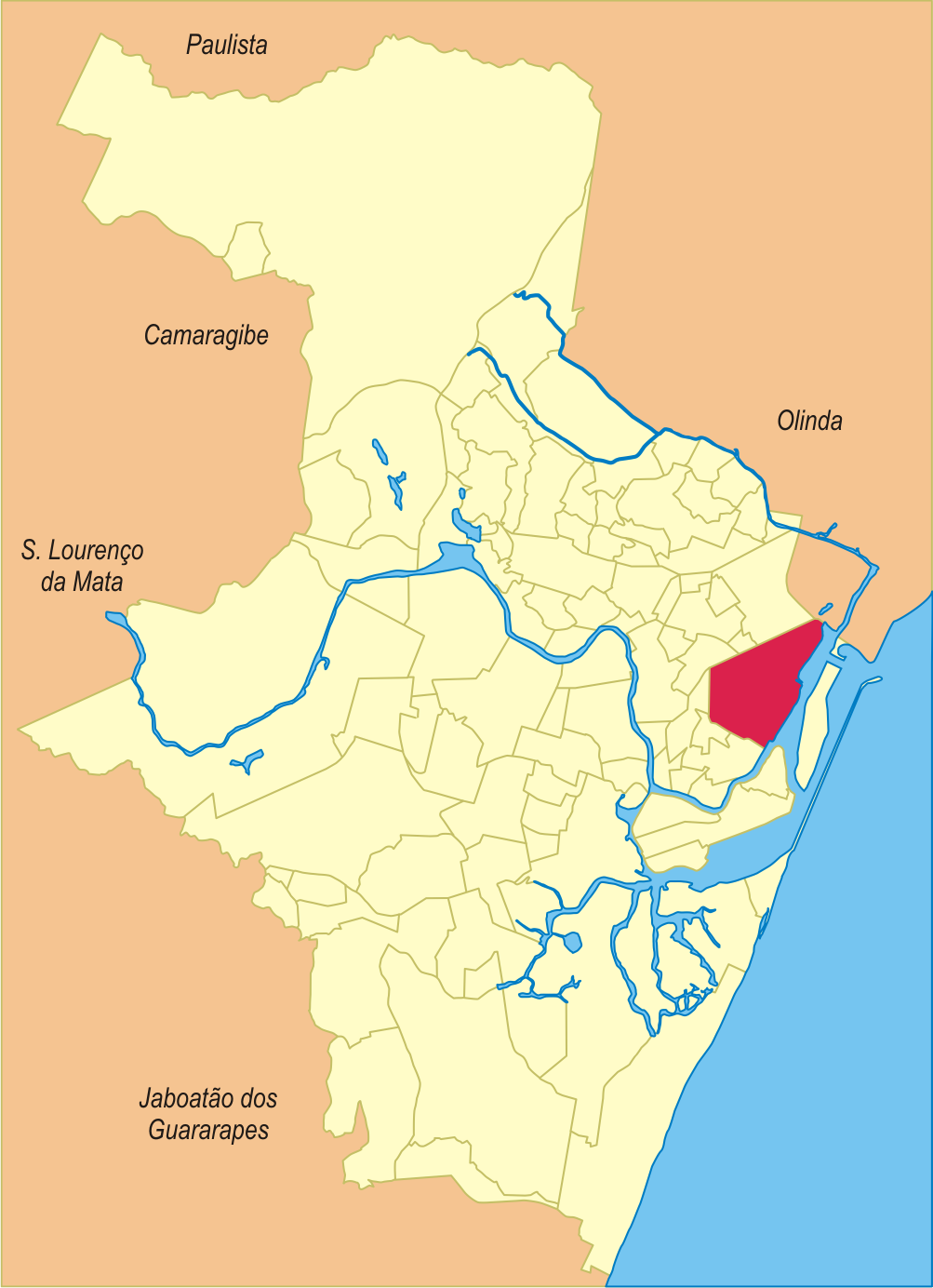
- Localization map
- Country: Brazil
- Region: Northeast
- State: Pernambuco
- Founded: 1814

Area
  - Total: 380 km^{2} (150 sq mi)

Population (1990–2010 2016−2017)
  - Total: 27,939

Santo Amaro is a neighborhood of Recife in the state of Pernambuco in Brazil, was founded in 1681 and incorporated in 1814. In 1814, the Cemitério dos Ingleses was built in the neighborhood, the first of the city, on a land donated by the Provincial Government to the English Consul in March 1869.

== Demographics ==
The district is located in the central region of Recife in Pernambuco, Brazil and has 27,939 inhabitants, with a male population of 12,680 (45.38) inhabitants and a female population of 15,259 (54.62) inhabitants. The majority of the population of the neighborhood is in the age group of 25 to 29 years old with index of 13,258 inhabitants (47,45%). With 8,474 households, it has an average of 3.3 residents per household, with a proportion of 55.32% of the women responsible for the household and the value of the monthly average household income is (1,892.10). According to the 2010 Census-IBGE.
