= Rawalpindi War Cemetery =

Pakistani cemetery

Details
- Location: Rawalpindi, Punjab, Pakistan
- Coordinates: 33°34′39″N 73°02′54″E
- Type: war cemetery
- No. of graves: 358
- Find a Grave: Rawalpindi War Cemetery

Rawalpindi War Cemetery is a cemetery situated on Harley Street in Rawalpindi in Punjab, Pakistan.

It is situated in the cantonment area. It is part of the Protestant Cemetery known as Gora Qabrastan (The White Cemetery). It is maintained by the Commonwealth War Graves Commission.

The cemetery contains 257 Commonwealth burials of the First World War, connected mainly with the operations on the North-West Frontier. There are also 101 burials from the Second World War.

== See also ==
- Karachi War Cemetery
