= Daniel Hoghton =

British Army officer

Major-General Daniel Hoghton
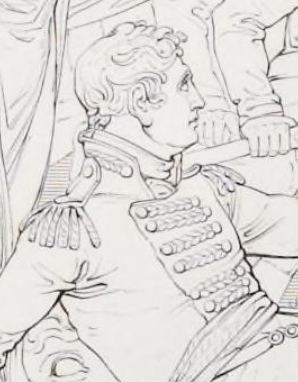
- Born: 27 August 1770; Castle Hedingham, Essex
- Died: 16 May 1811 (aged 40); Albuera, Spain
- Military career
- Allegiance: United Kingdom
- Branch: British Army
- Service years: 1793 to 1811
- Rank: Major general
- Conflicts: French Revolutionary Wars; Haitian Revolution; Napoleonic Wars; Second Battle of Copenhagen; Capture of Martinique; Siege of Cádiz; Battle of Albuera †

Major-General Daniel Hoghton (27 August 1770 – 16 May 1811) was a British Army officer who served during the French Revolutionary and Napoleonic Wars with distinction until his death during combat with the French at the Battle of Albuera in the Peninsula War. His death brought general mourning in Britain and a monument to his memory was raised in St Paul's Cathedral.

During his long career, Hoghton had fought on several West Indian islands, in India, Denmark, Portugal and Spain and had even spent a brief period standing in for a Royal Marines detachment in the Channel Fleet. A popular and able officer, Wellington was reported to have commented on his death: "I understand that it was impossible for anybody to behave better than he did . . . he, actually fell waving his hat and cheering his brigade on to the charge"

== French Revolutionary Wars ==
Hoghton was born in Castle Hedingham in Essex as second son to Sir Henry Hoghton, 6th Baronet and his second wife Fanny in 1770. He was educated at St John's College, Cambridge. Raised in political circles as the son of an MP, Daniel instead chose a military career and at 23 joined the 82nd Regiment of Foot as a captain through purchase at the outbreak of the French Revolutionary War in 1793. It took some time for Hoghton to settle, moving in 1794 to the short-lived 97th Regiment of Foot and in 1795 on their disbandment joining the 67th Regiment of Foot. Whilst with the 97th, Hoghton and his troops spent some months with the Channel Fleet as makeshift marines after manning shortages necessitated the posting. His father died the same year and the titles, estates and political offices passed to his elder brother Henry Philip Hoghton.

The 67th Regiment was dispatched to the West Indies in 1796 to take part in several campaigns, including serving in San Domingo during the Haitian Revolution and spending time stationed in Jamaica. The same year Hoghton was promoted to lieutenant colonel. In January 1799 Hoghton was transferred to the 88th Regiment of Foot, also known as the Connaught Rangers who were stationed in India. Hoghton took passage and met his regiment in Bombay. For unknown reasons Hoghton did not accompany his men to Egypt for the final defeat of the French army stationed there in 1801 and instead spent some years on the staff of Lord Mornington, returning to England with dispatches in 1804.

== Napoleonic Wars ==
Following his arrival in England during November 1804, Hoghton was given command of the newly raised 2nd battalion, 8th Regiment of Foot, gaining promotion to full colonel the following year. After training and preparing the regiment, Hoghton was dispatched with his troops to Denmark for participation in the Siege of Copenhagen under Sir Arthur Wellesley, whose brother Hoghton had known in India. Hoghton was not heavily engaged at Copenhagen and was soon transferred to the West Indies once more, participating in the invasion and capture of Martinique in 1809. It was for this reason that Hoghton did not join Wellesley in the Iberian Peninsula until 1810, taking command of a brigade in Cádiz.

On 25 July 1810, Hoghton made the jump to major-general and in September took command of the 3rd Brigade of the 2nd Division under Sir William Stewart, a man he had served under during the 1790s. Hoghton's first taste of action during the Peninsular War was at the Battle of Albuera, where Stewart's division was hastily deployed after a Spanish withdrawal on the right of the battleline. The rapid nature of the deployment opened the division to attack by French cavalry and the 1st brigade under Colonel John Colborne was almost destroyed. Hoghton's brigade held firm however and drove off the French cavalry and then withstood an attack by the 11,000 men of the French 5th Corps, three-quarters of the brigade falling dead or wounded during the furious battle. As the attack subsided, Hoghton removed his hat to motion his men forward and as he did so was struck by a musket ball and killed instantly.

Despite Hoghton's death, the brigade remained strong and withdrew from the field in good order, the action failing to produce a clear victor. Alone amongst the hundreds of men who fell from his division, Hoghton's body was retrieved in the immediate aftermath and carried to Elvas, where it was buried in the British Cemetery Elvas which is now a memorial to the 60,000 officers and men of the British and Portuguese armies who died alongside their Spanish allies in the cause of freedom and independence in the Peninsular War of 1808–1814. In Britain his death was treated with sorrow and a government motion paid for a monument to his memory to be raised in St Paul's Cathedral.
