= Contay British Cemetery =

War cemetery in France

Coordinates: 49.9989°N 2.4833°E

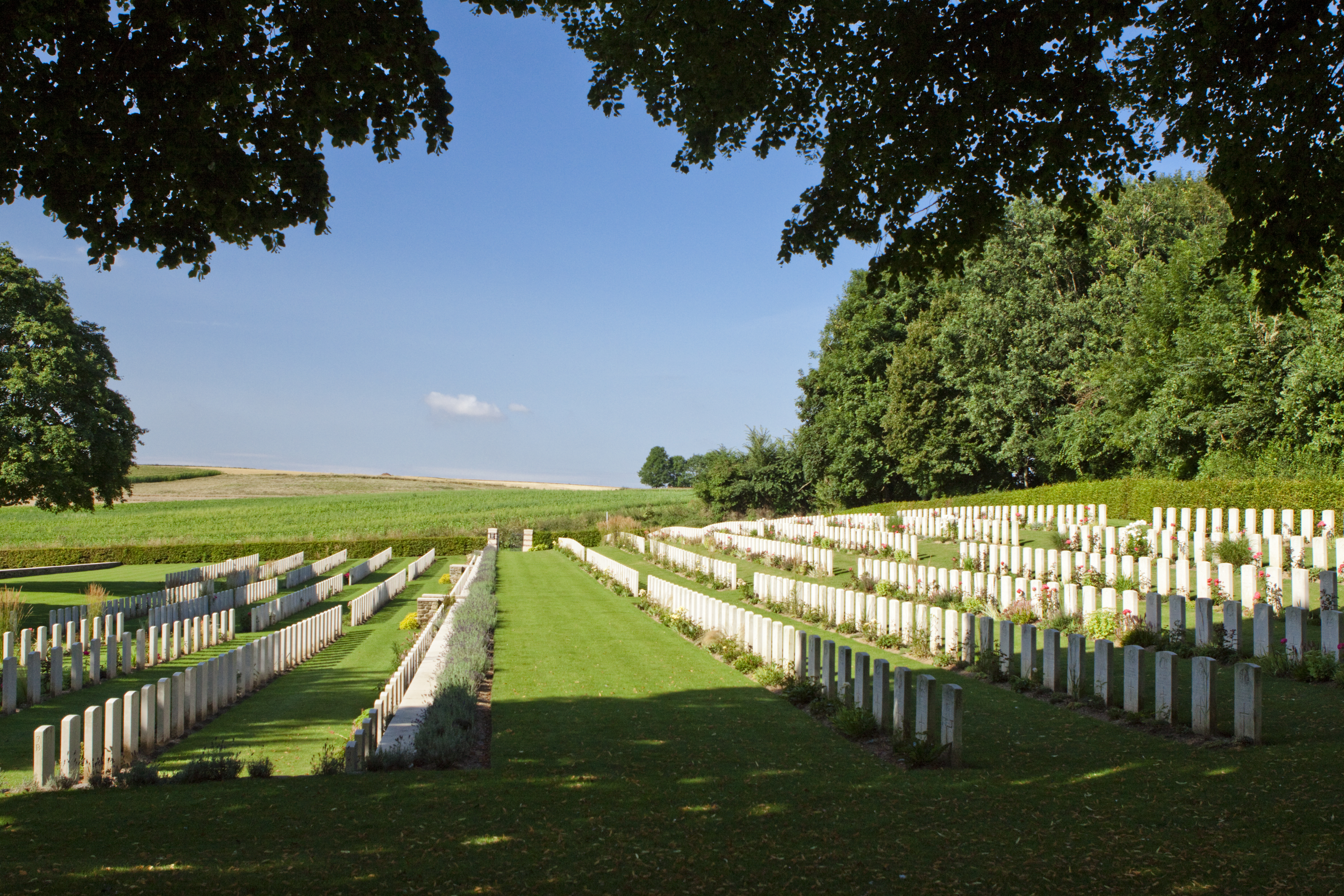
Contay Cemetery

The Contay British Commonwealth War Graves Commission Cemetery is a war cemetery in the Somme region of France, near Franvillers. Located in the cemetery are 1133 deceased, First World War Casualties. Designed by Sir Reginald Blomfield, it mainly holds dead from the Battle of Somme. It is maintained by The Commonwealth War Graves Commission.
