= Cemitério dos Ingleses, Recife =

Protestant cemetery in Brazil

British Cemetery Recife
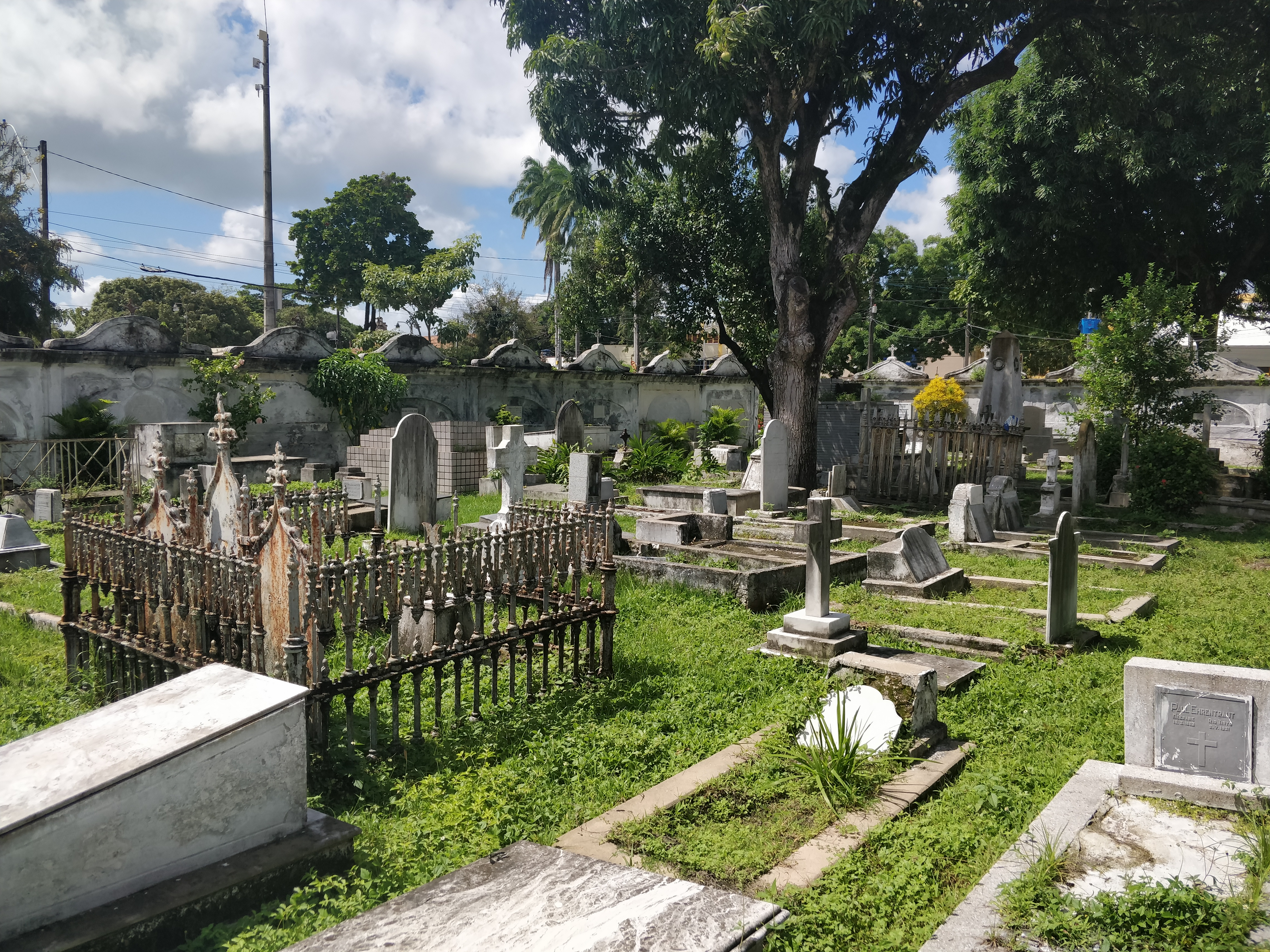
- General view of the cemetery
- Interactive map of British Cemetery Recife

Details
- Established: 1814
- Location: Santo Amaro, Recife, Pernambuco
- Country: Brazil
- Coordinates: 8°2′50″S 34°52′35″W
- Type: British
- Website: Cemetery details. Commonwealth War Graves Commission. Cemitério dos Ingleses / Ingleses em Pernambuco

The Cemitério dos Ingleses is a cemetery in Recife, the capital of Pernambuco in Brazil. It was built in 1814, and at the time was named British Cemetery.

== History ==
The Strangford Treaty, signed in 1810 in return for British support to the escape to Brazil from Lisbon of the Portuguese Royal Family in November 1807, led to the opening of trade between Britain and Brazil. Whereas previously Brazilian products destined for Britain and British products destined for Brazil had to be shipped through Portugal, after the treaty they could be sent directly. This led to an influx of British people into Recife who, as Protestants, were not permitted to be buried in Catholic cemeteries. By order of the Prince Regent of Portugal, the governor of the province of Pernambuco expropriated "a land of 120 palms in front, over 200 in depth", which was given to the British Consul in Recife to serve as a British cemetery.

Trade with Great Britain grew rapidly. Many British people died in Brazil due to yellow fever and other tropical diseases. Non-British Protestants were also permitted to be buried there and, occasionally, Catholics.

== Location ==
The cemetery is located in the neighborhood of Santo Amaro in Avenida Cruz Cabugá, between Recife and the historic city of Olinda. It was situated close to the area used for quarantining newly arrived slaves from Africa, and was relatively isolated from the centre of Recife at the time. The cemetery was later expanded through the purchase of neighbouring land. In the 1960s, the cemetery was reduced in size to make way for road improvements.

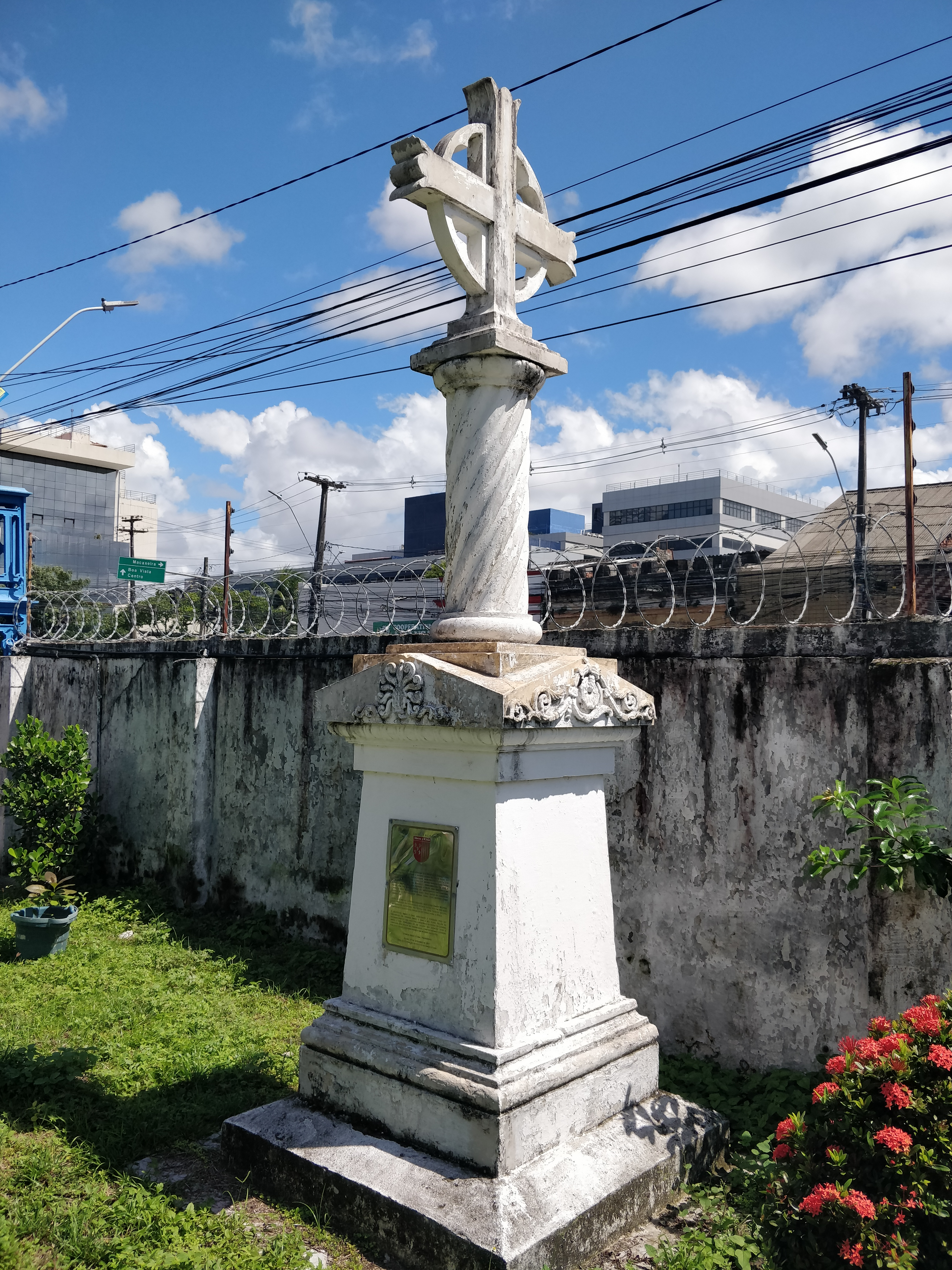
Memorial to José Inácio de Abreu e Lima

A surrounding wall is interrupted by an iron gate at the entrance, which was built to give visibility to the chapel inside. The cemetery appears to be permanently closed, though this is not the case. Access is difficult but in 2023 could be obtained during work hours by attracting the attention of the groundsman.

== Burials ==
The most important Brazilian buried in the cemetery is General José Inácio de Abreu e Lima, who fought for the liberation of Spanish-held lands in the Americas. As he was one of the leaders of Freemasonry in Recife, Bishop Cardoso Ayres denied permission for burial of his body in the Cemetery of Santo Amaro, in Recife. In 2005 the former president of Venezuela, Hugo Chávez, who had already visited the cemetery in 2000, returned because he wanted to build a mausoleum for Abreu e Lima. As of 2023 there had been no progress on the matter.

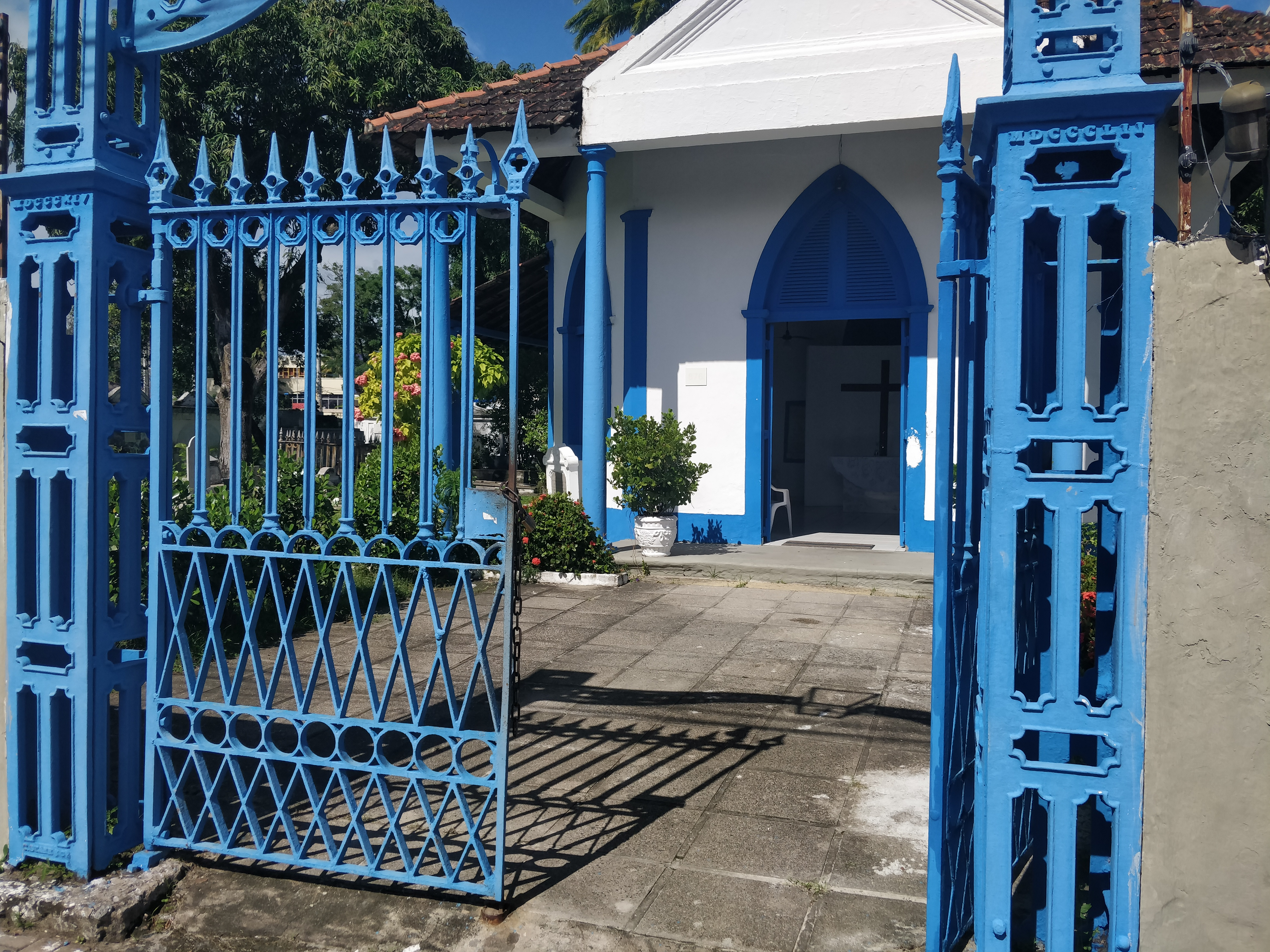
Entrance to the cemetery with the chapel

Protestant burials included those who worked for the Brazilian Submarine Telegraph Company, a forerunner of Cable & Wireless plc, the Recife Trolley Bus system, the Pernambuco Gas Works, the Great Western of Brazil Railway, the Bank of London and South America, the Royal Bank of Canada, Boxwell & Cia. (the largest cotton baling establishment), Williams & Cia. (sugar and cotton exporters), and Wilson Sons (coal importers), all of which employed many British people. British people were also employed by the North Brazil Sugar Factories Ltd at Tíuma in São Lourenço da Mata, to the northwest of Recife. Among the non-British graves are members of the Drechsler family. Max Drechsler & Cia was a printing company.

Several British families have multiple generations represented in the cemetery. They include the Brotherhood, Conolly, Comber and Starr families. Ernest Brotherhood was born in Wiltshire in England in 1848, one of 14 children of Rowland Brotherhood, an engineer, who collaborated with Isambard Kingdom Brunel on building the Great Western Railway. Many of the Americans buried in the cemetery were Presbyterian missionaries.

== Maintenance ==
The cemetery has been listed as a heritage site in the state of Pernambuco since 1984. It is maintained by the Sociedade Gestora do Cemitério dos Ingleses, which was founded in 1991, consisting of British residents and members of families of people buried in the cemetery. Around 80 each paid a recommended monthly fee of R$120 (approx. US$25) in 2023, which covered two employees, water, and electricity. A few burials still take place there, for which a fee is paid. The cemetery receives no financial help from the Brazilian or British governments and, with limited resources, is not in a good condition. Lacking resources, its web site is out of date.

Research into the history of the cemetery is constrained by the lack of records. Records of burials prior to 1978 have gone missing. These were held by the British Consulate in Recife but were sent to the consulate in Rio de Janeiro for "safe keeping". Records between 1978 and the turn of the century suffered water damage.

== Chaplains ==
For a long time, after the 2000s, the Chapel was inactive, without regular services. Currently, the Chapel houses a small community of the Anglican Episcopal Church of Brazil, following liturgical practices of the Anglo-Catholicism. The same community continued the tradition of Anglican chaplains, a list of which is given below:

- The Reverend John Penny (1st British chaplain);
- The Reverend Charles A. Austin (the “English Priest”);
- The Reverend Benjamin F. Tuckniss;
- The Reverend Midgley;
- The Reverend William Ding;
- The Reverend W. E. Macray;
- The Reverend F. M. Lane;
- The Reverend George W. Baile;
- The Reverend J. Meredith Bate;
- The Reverend Archibald Nicol;
- The Reverend H. J. Dobb;
- The Reverend Eric C. Wilcokson;
- The Reverend J. Gould;
- The Reverend D. N. Jackson;
- The Reverend Theodore Hina;
- The Reverend Cecil R. Burton;
- The Reverend R. F. Pearce;
- The Reverend John Ellesworth;
- The Reverend Denis Pape;
- The Reverend Alfredo Rocha da Fonseca (1st Brazilian chaplain);
- The Reverend Paulo Roberto Medeiros; Reverend John Said¹ (1st American chaplain);
- The Reverend Philip Getchell;¹
- The Reverend Paulo Ruiz Garcia;
- The Reverend Anderson Bruno Costa;²
- The Reverend Rafael Vilaça Epifani Costa²

¹ Co-parish priests and chaplains of Holy Trinity Church. ² Current chaplains of the Cemetery.
