= Chatteshwari Temple =

Temple in Chittagong, Bangladesh

Chatteshwari Kali Temple
- চট্টেশ্বরী কালী মন্দির
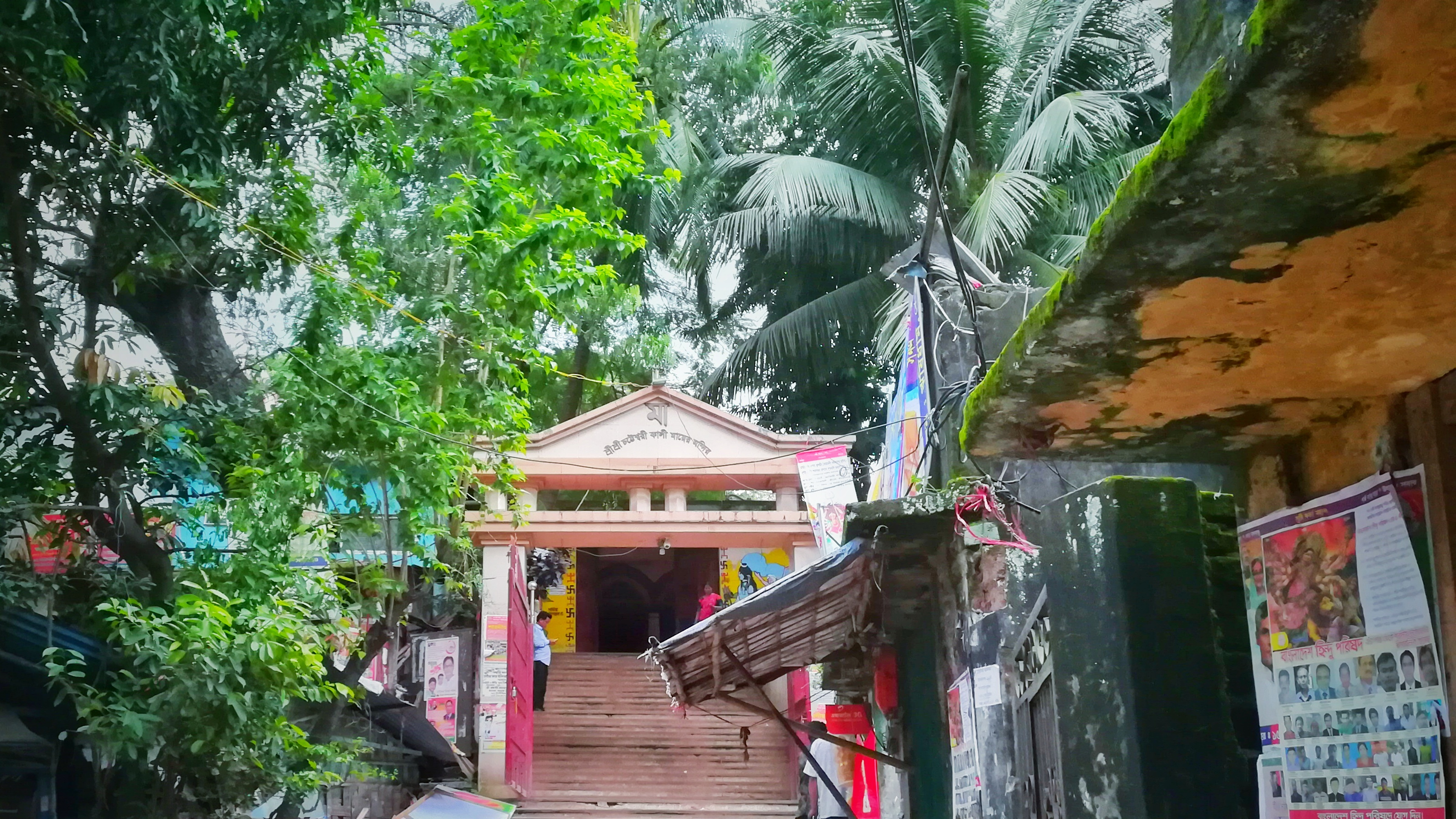
- Main Entrance

- Location within Bangladesh

Religion
- Affiliation: Hinduism
- District: Chittagong
- Region: Chittagong

Location
- Location: 20 Chatteshwari Road, Chittagong,
- Country: Bangladesh
- Coordinates: 22.35275°N 91.82605°E

Architecture
- Established: 18th century

Sree Sree Chatteshwari Kali Temple is a Hindu temple is dedicated to the Goddess Kali located in the centre of Chattogram (Chittagong) city in Bangladesh. It is considered one of the prominent Shakta pithas of Bengal. This temple was damaged by Pakistani soldiers during the Bangladesh liberation war. The temple was rebuilt by the Chakraborty family. The previous idol was made of neem wood which was nearly destroyed during the war . Only upper portion of the idol was rescued by a member of Chakraborty family after the war ended . The half neem wood idol is still there in the temple. After the war ended the temple was rebuilt by the family and a new statue was established which was made in Benaras and taken to the temple from India by air by a member of Chakraborty family named Tarapada Adhikary also known as Tarapada Chakraborty. The statue was donated by Tarun Kanti Ghosh and his family -ex minister of West Bengal.

== Shakta pitha ==
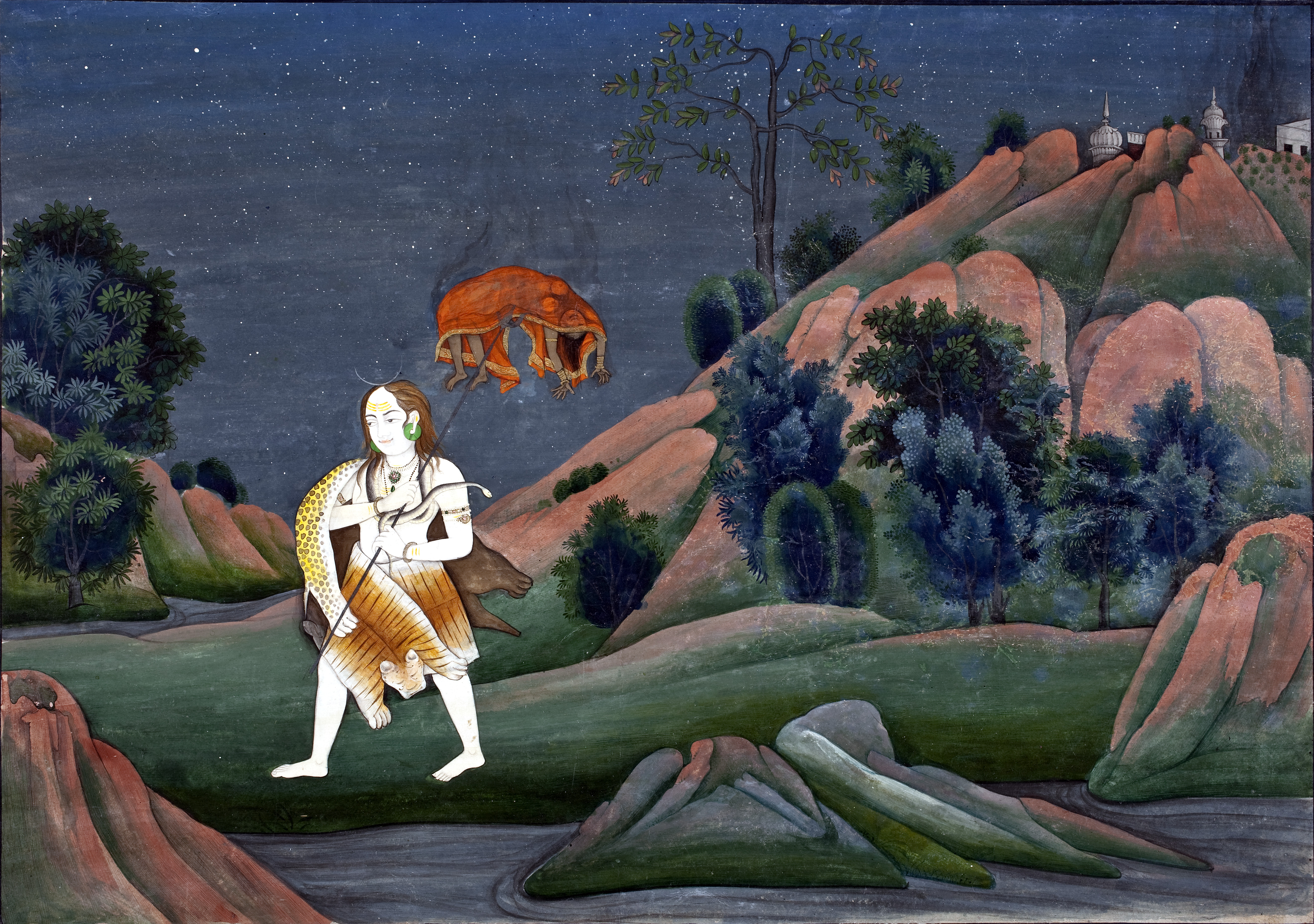
Shiva carrying the corpse of Sati Devi

Chatteshwari Temple is considered one of the Shakta pithas, which are holy places revered by Shaktism. The origin of the Shakta pithas is from the mythology of Daksha Yaga and Sati Devi's self immolation and Shiva carrying her corpse resulting in the falling of body parts as he wandered. Those shrines where Sati Devi's body parts fell came to be known as Shakta pithas.

== Gallery ==
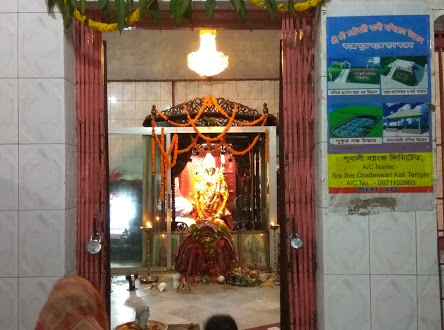
Idol of the goddess Kali in Chatteshwari Temple

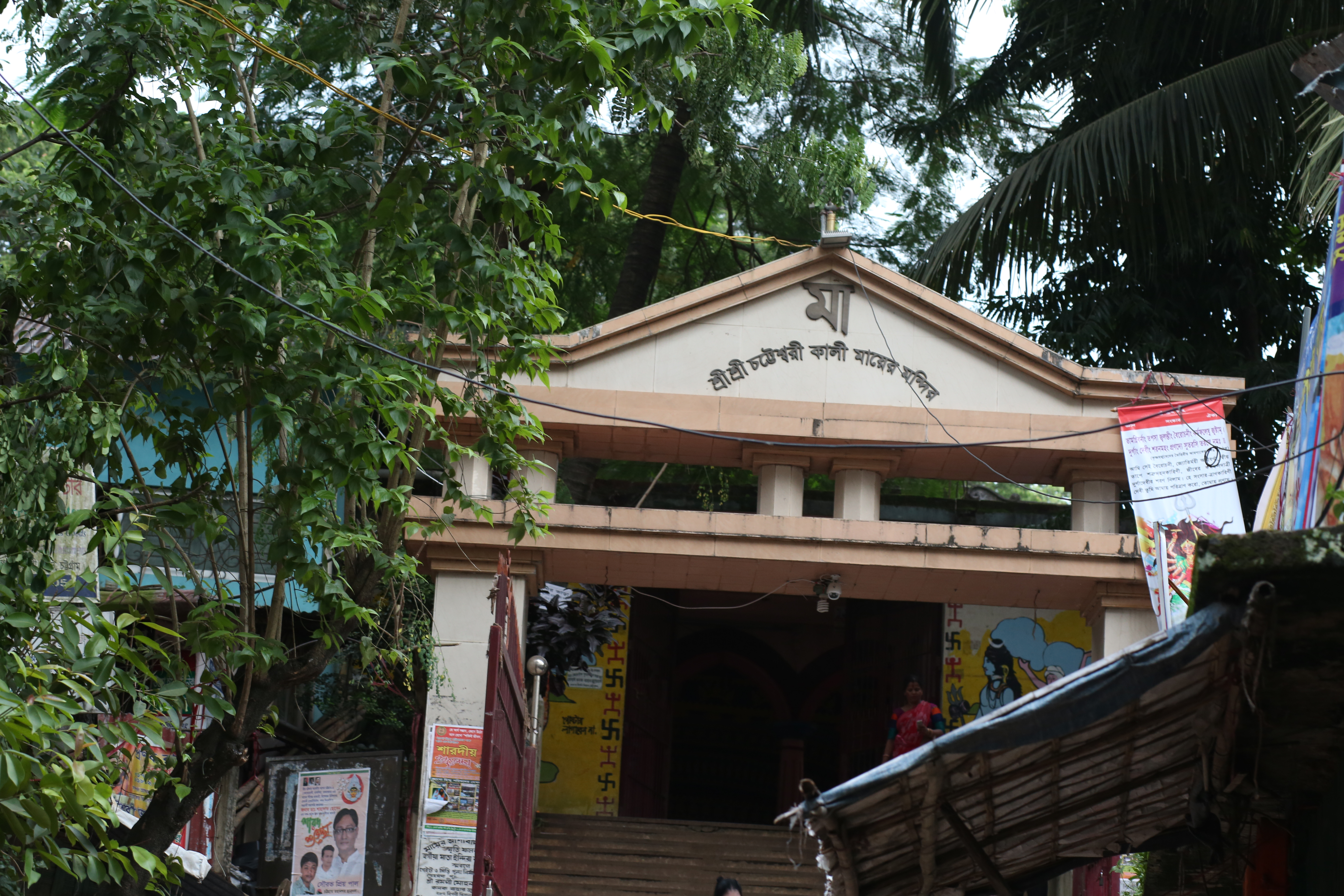
A view of the entrance
