= Karachi War Cemetery =

Commonwealth War Graves Commission cemetery in Pakistan

- Commonwealth War Graves Commission
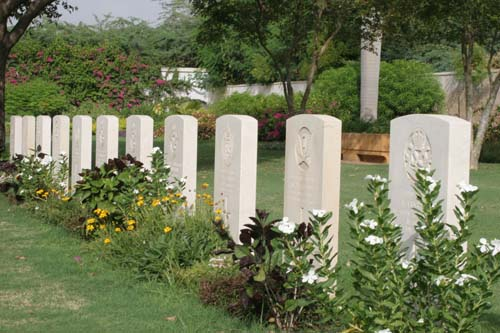
- For World War II
- Established: 1945
- Location: 24°53′40″N 67°05′27″E near Karachi, Sindh, Pakistan
- Total burials: 642

Burials by nation
- British Empire

Burials by war
- World War II

The Karachi War Cemetery was created after the Second World War to receive remains from cemeteries scattered across British India, as it was felt that their proper maintenance could not be assured.

In 2016, British Deputy High Commissioner Ms Belinda Lewis, Defence Adviser Brigadier General Murray Whiteside and British Naval and Air Adviser Group Captain John Alexander attended the Remembrance Service at the cemetery.

== World War II graves ==
All the graves (642) are from the Second World War. There are several recipients of Mention in Dispatches (MiD) and Distinguished Service Order (DSO), three recipients of the Military Cross (MC), along with one listed with Member of the Order of the British Empire (MBE) and three with the Order of the British Empire (OBE).

=== Remains shifted from other places ===
Some remains of soldiers and other personnel who died during World War II and later between 1945 and 1947, were shifted from the following towns in Pakistan, by the Commonwealth War Graves Commission (CWGC) and the British Council:

- Old Christian Cemetery, Abbottabad
- Jhelum Christian Cemetery

== Notable burial ==
Major Walter John Clare Duncan of Somerset, who belonged to the 12th Frontier Force Regiment Guides Cavalry has a DSO and Bar with MC.

== Maintenance ==
The CWGC is responsible for its upkeep. It employs 4 people on site: 3 gardeners and a supervisor.
