= British Cemetery, Elvas =

Cemetery in Elvas, Portugal

British Cemetery Elvas
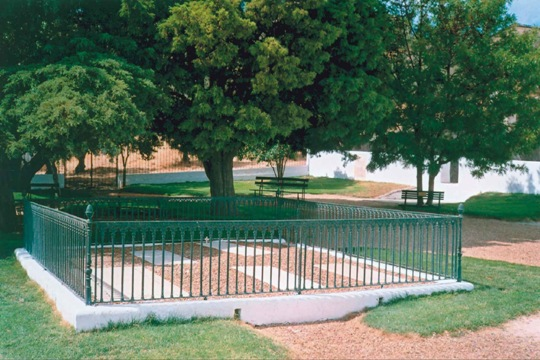
- The British Cemetery, Elvas.
- Interactive map of British Cemetery Elvas

Details
- Established: 1811
- Location: Elvas, Portugal
- Country: Portugal
- Coordinates: 38°53′00″N 7°09′41″W
- Type: Public

The British Cemetery at Elvas, Portugal (Portuguese: Cemitério dos Ingleses) is one of the oldest British Military Cemeteries in existence. It holds only five known graves but two of these are the only marked graves of the thousands of British soldiers who fell at the Battle of Albuera and another is the sole marked grave of the thousands who fell in the three sieges of Badajoz.

The British Cemetery is situated in the bastion of S. João da Corujeiro, high on the eastern wall of Fort Elvas and just below the castle, commanding a fine view over the plain to Badajoz in Spain. It is named after the nearby chapel, founded by the Friars of St. John’s Hospitallers in 1228 to mark the spot at which they broke into the Moorish defences.

The area containing the graves of Maj. Gen. Daniel Hoghton, Lt. Col. Daniel White, Lt. Col. James Ward Oliver, Maj. William Nicholas Bull and his wife Caroline is surrounded by a cast-iron railing, installed on 20 August 1904 by the Military Governor Brig. J.C. Rodrigues da Costa. A small stone engraved with G.P.E. 20-8-1904 commemorates the occasion. For many years the cemetery lay within Portuguese military jurisdiction. The cemetery was rededicated in 1997 and is now maintained by the Friends of the British Cemetery, Elvas, and open to the public.

== Peninsular War ==
Throughout the history of Portugal, Elvas has been a key to its land defence. In 1811 it was the southern gateway to Spain, faced by Badajoz. In the north, Almeida facing Ciudad Rodrigo, fulfilled the same role. The Duke of Wellington was anxious to secure both cities before advancing into Spain and chose to conduct the operations in the north himself and leave Marshal Beresford, the Commander in Chief of the Portuguese army, in command of the southern operation.

The second siege of Badajoz was interrupted by the advance at Albuera where the French Army was repulsed on 16 May 1811 in one of the bloodiest actions of the Peninsular War. Badajoz was not taken until March 1812, at great cost. In the sieges of Badajoz and the Battle of Albuera, the forces of Britain, Portugal, Spain and Germany lost some 11,000 men.

== Regimental plaques ==
Regimental plaques were hung on the walls of the cemetery in May 2000 in the presence of the British Ambassador, Sir John Holmes and the Chief of the Portuguese Army Staff, General Martins Barento, in recognition of the British and Portuguese Regiments that fought in the Battle of Albuera and the Sieges of Badajoz. The Portuguese Army carried out the restoration and landscaping of the cemetery and the installation of the plaques. Maintenance of the cemetery remains the responsibility of The Friends of the British Cemetery.

In May 2004 General Fulgencio Coll Bucher, Commander of Mechanised Brigade XI - Extremadura and Military Governor of Badajoz, unveiled a plaque, in the presence of the British Ambassador to Portugal, to the Spanish Regiments that fought at Albuera.

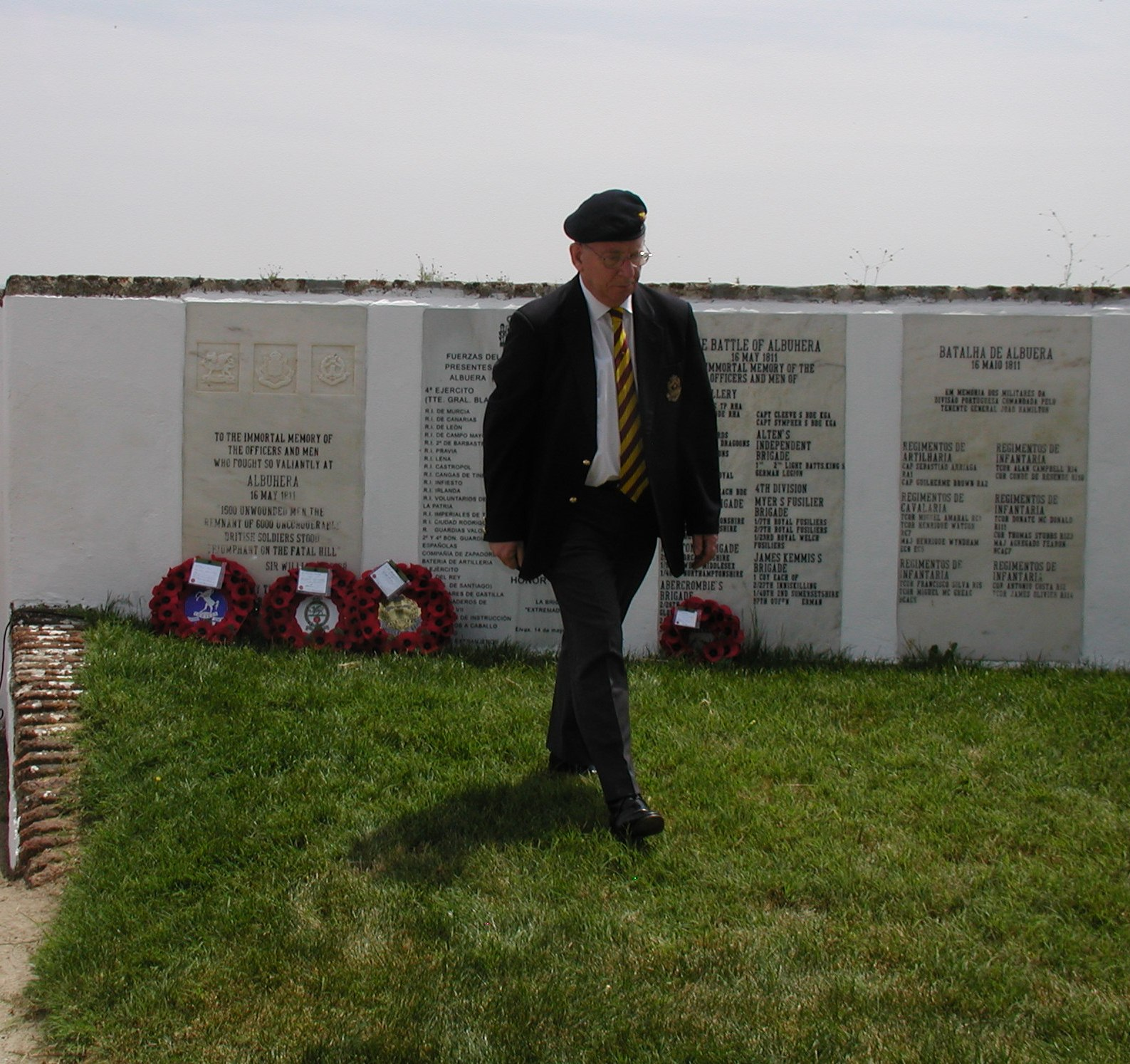
A British veteran at the Albuera Wall

A Portuguese salute

A Spanish salute

Regimental plaques on the Badajoz Wall

On 14 May 2011 Peninsular War 200 dedicated a plaque on the Albuera Wall in remembrance of the 60,000 officers and men of the British and Portuguese armies who died alongside their Spanish allies in the cause of freedom and independence in the Peninsular War.

== Graves ==
Known graves include:

- Major General Daniel Hoghton, who fell at the head of his brigade in the Battle of Albuera, on 16 May 1811. General Hoghton was the 41-year-old younger son of the late MP Sir Henry Hoghton Bt. Gazetted into the 8th Foot, he was in command of a brigade in Stewarts 2nd Division. At the start of the battle this division was in reserve but was shortly moved to the south to relieve the brigade of Zayas’ Division of Spanish infantry, which had held the French attack. For the rest of the day, Hoghton's brigade was at the centre of the battle and gave no ground but at horrific expense. 63% of the brigade were casualties and at the end of the day the senior officer of the brigade was a captain. In one battalion the ensign of the colour tore it from its staff and stuffed it in his jacket to prevent its capture. His body was found and buried by the only remaining members of his company – one sergeant and one corporal.

Generals Beresford and Stewart, citing the 1654 Anglo-Luso Treaty, requested the governor of Elvas that General Hoghton be buried in the British Cemetery, Elvas. Memorials were placed in St. Paul's Cathedral, London and St. Leonard's Church, Walton-in-the-Dale, Lancashire.

- Lieutenant Colonel Daniel White commanded the 29th (Worcestershire) Regiment of Foot which formed part of Gen Hoghton’s Brigade at the Battle of Albuera. He died in Elvas on 3 June 1811 of wounds received in that battle. His stone was installed in 2003 upon the discovery of his obituary in the Gentleman’s Magazine.
- Lieutenant Colonel James Ward Oliver was a captain in the 4th (King’s Own Royal Border Regiment) until 1809, when he volunteered for service in the Portuguese Army and was twice promoted. First he was promoted Major on the General Staff of the British Army and then Lieutenant Colonel in the Portuguese Army. He commanded the 14th Regiment of Portuguese Infantry at Albuera and at the second siege of Badajoz where he received wounds from which he died in Elvas on 17 June 1811.
- Major William Nicholas Bull died in Monforte on 14 February 1850 aged 50. He served in the 20th and 21st Battalions of the 2nd Regiment of the Brigada Real da Marinha. The Friends of the British Cemetery has a copy of a letter of May 1833 regretting his recent resignation and requesting reinstatement in his original rank of Lieutenant.
- Caroline Bull died on 28 June 1863.

Lt.Col. Charles Bevan, who was buried on 11 July 1811 in Portalegre, is honoured with a plaque on the west wall.
