= John Budd Phear =

Chief Justice of British Ceylon from 1877 to 1879 and anthropologist

Sir John Budd Phear

13th Chief Justice of Ceylon
- In office 18 October 1877 – September 1879
- Appointed by: James Robert Longden
- Preceded by: William Hackett
- Succeeded by: Richard Cayley; Harry Dias Bandaranaike as Acting

Personal details
- Born: 9 February 1825 Earl Stonham, Suffolk, England
- Died: 7 April 1905 Exmouth, Devon, England
- Spouse: Catherine Wreford

Sir John Budd Phear (9 February 1825 – 7 April 1905) was a judge and author who was the 13th Chief Justice of Ceylon. He was appointed on 18 October 1877 succeeding William Hackett and was Chief Justice until 1879. He was succeeded by Richard Cayley. When Phear retired Harry Dias Bandaranaike acted as Chief Justice for 12 days.

Phear was the eldest of three sons of John Phear, rector of Earl Stonham. One of his brothers, Samuel George Phear, became Master of Emmanuel College, Cambridge. John Phear also stood as the Liberal parliamentary candidate for Honiton in the reformed 1885 borough elections but ultimately lost to Sir John Kennaway, Conservative candidate and never stood for the seat again.

Phear died on 7 April 1905 in Marpool House in Exmouth, Devon. His estate, the Marpool estate, was gifted to the town and opened as Phear Park in 1910.

== Works ==
- Lecture on the Rules of Evidence in Indian Courts of Law … delivered before the Bethune Society on 8th March, 1866 J. C. Hay & Co.: Calcutta, 1866.
- The Hindoo Joint Family. A lecture, etc. G. C. Hay & Co.: Calcutta, 1867.
- Indian Famines and Village Organization. A paper, etc. London.-III. East India Association: 1877
- The Aryan Village in India and Ceylon. London 1880 (Reprint Neu Delhi, 1975) (online; PDF; 8.3 MB)
- International Trade, and the relation between exports and imports. A paper, etc. Macmillan & Co.: London, 1881.

Legal offices
| Preceded by William Hackett | Chief Justice of Ceylon; 1877-1879 | Succeeded by Richard Cayley; Harry Dias Bandaranaike as Acting |
