= Gresham Nicholson =

Royal Navy Admiral (1892–1975)

Admiral Sir Gresham Nicholson KBE CB DSO DSC
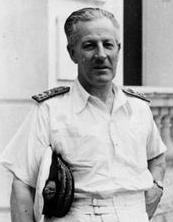
- Nicholson in March 1945
- Born: 16 December 1892
- Died: 28 July 1975 (aged 82)
- Military career
- Allegiance: United Kingdom
- Branch: Royal Navy
- Service years: 1914–1950
- Rank: Admiral
- Commands: HMNB Devonport (1945–50); Royal Naval Barracks, Chatham (1940–43); 6th Destroyer Flotilla (1938–40); HMS Somali (1938–40); HMS Curacoa (1936); HMS Pegasus (1935)
- Conflicts: First World War; Second World War
- Awards: Knight Commander of the Order of the British Empire; Companion of the Order of the Bath; Distinguished Service Order; Distinguished Service Cross; Mentioned in Despatches (2); Order of the Phoenix (Greece)

Admiral Sir Randolph Stewart Gresham Nicholson, KBE, CB, DSO, DSC (16 December 1892 – 28 July 1975) was a Royal Navy officer who became Lieutenant-Governor of Jersey.

== Early life ==
Nicholson was educated at the Royal Naval College, Osborne, and the Royal Naval College, Dartmouth, as a cadet.

== Naval career ==
Nicolson served in the First World War with the Harwich Force and took part in the Zeebrugge and Ostend Raids in 1918. After the war, he joined the staff at the Royal Navy College, Dartmouth and then became Aide-de-camp to the Governor of Malaya and the Straits Settlements. He was appointed Captain of the aircraft carrier HMS Pegasus in 1935, Captain of the cruiser HMS Curacoa in 1936 and Captain of HMS Somali and Commander of the Tribal Destroyer Flotilla in 1938. Under Nicholson's command, the Somali took possession of the Hannah Böge, the first prize of the Second World War at sea, just two hours into the war. He continued his war service as Commodore-in-Command, Royal Naval Barracks, Chatham from November 1940 to August 1943 and was then appointed as Flag Officer, Ceylon from August 1943 to April 1944. He was then appointed Flag Officer, Ceylon and Deputy Commander-in-Chief of the Eastern Fleet until July 1945. After the war, he became Admiral-Superintendent of Devonport until his retirement in 1950.

In retirement, he served as Lieutenant-Governor of Jersey. There is a memorial to him in Holy Trinity Church, Rudgwick.

Government offices
Preceded by Sir Arthur Grassett	Lieutenant Governor of Jersey; 1953–1958	Succeeded by Sir George Erskine
