= Jacobus de Wet =

Chief Justice of British Ceylon from 1882 to 1883

15th Chief Justice of Ceylon
- In office 31 May 1882 – 29 May 1883
- Appointed by: James Robert Longden
- Preceded by: Richard Cayley
- Succeeded by: Bruce Burnside

Personal details
- Born: 25 August 1838 Cape Town, Cape Colony
- Died: 19 April 1900 (aged 61) Eastbourne, East Sussex, England
- Spouse: Emma Susannah Fuller
- Children: Helen Frances de Wet Davies (Adopted)
- Education: Leiden University; University of London

Sir Jacobus Petrus de Wet (25 August 1838 – 19 April 1900) was the 15th Chief Justice of Ceylon. He was appointed on 31 May 1882 succeeding Richard Cayley and was Chief Justice until 29 May 1883. He was succeeded by Bruce Burnside.

De Wet was born to Johannes Carolus and Catharina Aletta (née Zeederberg) de Wet, he was the second of their seven surviving children. His mother died young when de Wet was only twelve years old. In 1851 his father married Magdalena Elisabeth (née Deneysen). De Wet came from a well to do Dutch speaking Cape family.

De Wet attended Leiden University however did not complete his studies, instead obtained his BA degree at the University of London. He was called to the Inner Temple, London, as a barrister-at-law in June 1863. Shortly after being admitted as a barrister, he returned to the Cape and six months later, on 14 December 1863, he was also admitted to the Cape Bar.

In April 1882 de Wet and Emma sailed for Colombo, Ceylon, via Calcutta, India. De Wet assumed his duties as Chief Justice four months after Sir Richard Cayley had left for England, on 31 May 1882.

He was knighted in the 1883 Birthday Honours.

Legal offices
Preceded by Richard Cayley	Chief Justice of Ceylon; 1882-1883	Succeeded by Bruce Burnside
