= Richard Cayley =

Chief Justice of British Ceylon from 1879 to 1882

Sir Richard Cayley

14th Chief Justice of Ceylon
- In office 1 October 1879 – 1882
- Appointed by: James Robert Longden
- Preceded by: John Budd Phear; Harry Dias Bandaranaike as Acting
- Succeeded by: Jacobus de Wet

14th Queen's Advocate of Ceylon
- In office 4 April 1876 – 1879
- Governor: William Henry Gregory
- Preceded by: Richard Morgan
- Succeeded by: Bruce Burnside

Puisne Justice of the Supreme Court of Ceylon
- In office 26 July 1873 – 1 February 1876

Personal details
- Born: 22 April 1833
- Died: 5 April 1908 (aged 74)
- Spouse: Sophia
- Education: St John's College, Cambridge

Sir Richard Cayley (22 April 1833 – 5 April 1908) was a British lawyer who served as the 14th Chief Justice of Ceylon and 14th Queen's Advocate of Ceylon.

Richard Cayley was born on 22 April 1833, the son of Edward Cayley and Frances Twopenny. He was educated at Stamford School between 1842 and 1851 before going up to St John's College, Cambridge in 1851.

On 26 July 1873 he was appointed Puisne Justice of the Supreme Court of Ceylon, and between 9 September 1875 to 1 February 1876 he functioned as Senior Puisne Justice. After serving for a period as Queen's Advocate, he succeeded Sir John Budd Phear as Chief Justice.

As such he heard before the Supreme Court the case of Jayawardena v. Queen's Advocate. Up to the time of Jayawardena's case, the right to sue the Crown had the character of a "taken for granted law", but here the serving Queen's Advocate argued that suing the Crown was an "attempt to impugn the royal prerogative". In giving his ruling on this case, Chief Justice Cayley said, "To hold at this date, for the first time, that a practice, which has so long been sanctioned by the Courts and acquiesced in by the Government, is bad in law,...would [lead to] widespread confusion and ...in many cases to injustice."

In 1882 he returned to England, initially on ill-health leave, and then retiring. He was knighted in June that year. He was succeeded as Chief Justice by Jacobus de Wet.

After retirement he held the office of Justice of the Peace for the counties of Northamptonshire and Rutland. He was a member of the original committee responsible for the foundation, in 1889, of the Old Stamfordian Club for old boys of his alma mater. The club remains a thriving concern to this day.

He died on 5 April 1908 aged 74.

Cayley married on 17 April 1866 Sophia Wilson, daughter of David Wilson, a member of the Legislative Council of Ceylon. They had several children, including a daughter Adeline Matilda Cayley who married in 1902 William Sidney Hargreaves and Dorothy Mary Cayley, the distinguished mycologist who identified the viral origin of tulip fire.

Legal offices
Preceded by John Budd Phear; Harry Dias Bandaranaike as Acting	Chief Justice of Ceylon; 1879-1882	Succeeded by Jacobus de Wet
Preceded by Richard Morgan	Queen's Advocate of Ceylon; 1876–1879	Succeeded by Bruce Burnside
