= Harry Dias Bandaranaike =

Ceylonese (Sri Lankan) barrister and judge

The Honourable Sir Harry Dias Bandaranaike
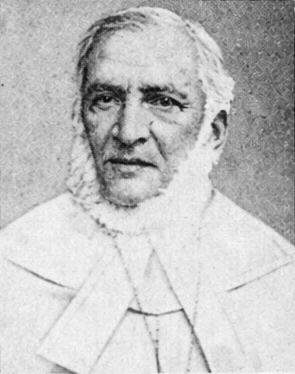

Acting Chief Justice of Ceylon
- In office 9 January 1888 – 5 June 1888
- Appointed by: Arthur Hamilton-Gordon
- Preceded by: Bruce Burnside
- Succeeded by: Bruce Burnside
- In office 1 October 1879 – 12 October 1879
- Appointed by: James Robert Longden
- Preceded by: Richard Cayley
- Succeeded by: Richard Cayley

28th Puisne Justice of the Supreme Court of Ceylon
- In office 5 July 1879 – 1892
- Appointed by: James Robert Longden

Acting Puisne Justice of the Supreme Court of Ceylon
- In office 1876–1876
- Appointed by: William Henry Gregory

Personal details
- Born: 22 August 1822
- Died: 24 June 1901 (aged 78)
- Relations: Bandaranaike family
- Education: University of Cambridge

Justice Sir Harry Dias Bandaranaike (22 August 1822 - 24 June 1901) was a Ceylonese (Sri Lankan) barrister and judge. He was the first Sinhalese and native acting Chief Justice and Puisne Justice of the Supreme Court of Sri Lanka. He was an Unofficial Member of Legislative Council of Ceylon.

Born to Jacabus Dias Wijewardena Bandaranaike, Mudaliyar of Governor Gate and translator of the Supreme Court of Ceylon. His brothers include John Charles Dias Bandaranaike and the Rev Canon Samuel William Dias Bandaranaike. Educated at the ( Royal College, Colombo ) Colombo Academy and King's College, London. He became the first Ceylonese Barrister when he was called to the bar at Middle Temple in 1848.

Having returned to Ceylon, he began his legal practice as an Advocate of the Supreme Court and served as a Member of Legislative Council from 1861 to 1864. In 1885 he was appointed as the first Sinhalese Judge of the Supreme Court, a post he held till 1892, during which he served as acting Chief Justice in 1888. He was Knighted in the 1893 Birthday Honours and represented Ceylon at the Diamond Jubilee of Queen Victoria in 1896.
