= James Samuel Berridge =

British planter, businessman, judge and politician

James Samuel Berridge (24 September 1806 – 5 November 1885) was a British planter, businessman, judge and politician who served as Governor of Saint Kitts.

== Early life ==
Born 24 September 1806 on St Kitts, he was the eldest son of an immigrant from England, Lieutenant-Colonel James Berridge (1774-1851), a businessman who served as Treasurer of St Kitts and as Aide-de-Camp to the Governor. and his wife Alice (1782-1818). She was the daughter of Samuel Skinner, a Loyalist from Boston, Massachusetts, and his wife Rachel Cuvilje, of a Huguenot family from Sint Eustatius.

His younger brother Lieutenant-Colonel Thomas Probyn Berridge (1818-1902) was also active in business and politics on St Kitts, while his elder sister Elizabeth Berridge (1800-1857) married Thomas de Burgh O'Maley (1779-1838), an Army surgeon who practised as a GP on the island and was a member of the Legislative Council.

Taken to England in 1811, he was educated at Charterhouse School and then at Trinity Hall, Cambridge.

== Career ==
When his father retired to Georgian House in Basseterre, James lived on the Lime Kiln plantation and also owned Heldens and Spooners. Following his father into politics, he was elected to the St Kitts House of Assembly for the Cayon ward on 16 July 1839, being appointed Quarantine Commissioner on 29 August 1839 and then Treasurer on 22 October 1839. That year he broadened his business interests by becoming the first manager of the St Kitts branch of the Colonial Bank (since part of Barclays).

In 1846 he went to England to plead the case for the island's economy, facing crisis after the Slavery Abolition Act 1833 made the local sugar industry less competitive and the UK started importing cheap sugar from countries still using slave labour. He won agreement to recruit labourers from Madeira and India. That year he was elected President of the Legislative Council and next year became a judge of the Court of Queen's Bench and Common Pleas.

With his brother, he was appointed to the board of the Colonial Life insurance company (since merged with Standard Life) in 1855 and was made the island's Postmaster in 1860. Finally, he served another term as President of Council in 1870 and then became a member of the Executive Council of the Leeward Islands in 1872.

An active participant at St George's church in Basseterre, he was a member of the vestry and a church trustee. He died at Lime Kiln on 5 November 1885.

== Family ==
In 1833 in Warwickshire he married Jane (1803-1888), daughter of John Hood Chapman and his wife Sarah, daughter of the Reverend John Mitchel. They had two daughters: Georgiana Caroline Berridge (1844-1919) married Colonel Arthur Frederick Jones (1841-1913) while Alice Emily Berridge (1846-1910) married Sir James Robert Longden (1827-1891).

== See also ==
- List of colonial governors of Saint Christopher
