= Charles Edward Bright =

English businessman in colonial Victoria

Charles Edward Bright CMG JP (20 May 1829 – 17 July 1915) was an English businessman in colonial Victoria.

Bright belonged to an old Worcestershire family possessing estates in the counties of Worcester and Hereford. He was the fifth son of Robert Bright, of Bristol and Abbots Leigh, Somerset, by Caroline, daughter of Thomas Tyndall, of The Fort, Bristol. The Bright family were merchants who owned land in the West Indies, and were compensated £8,384 by the British government for 404 slaves upon the abolition of slavery.

Bright's brothers were Richard Bright, who was elected M.P. for East Somerset in 1868, and Lieut.-General Sir Robert Onesiphorus Bright.

Bright emigrated to Australia, arriving in Melbourne in Jan. 1854. He became a partner in the firms of Messrs. Antony Gibbs & Co., and Gibbs, Bright & Co. He was twice Chairman of the Melbourne Harbor Trust, and for many years Trustee of the Public Library, Museum, and National Gallery of Victoria. He was Commissioner to the Exhibition of London, 1861-2; Dublin, 1864; Melbourne, 1866–7; London, 1873–4; Melbourne, 1880; Calcutta, 1883; Adelaide, 1887; and Melbourne, 1888. On 25 August 1868 he married the Hon. Anne Maria Georgiana Manners-Sutton, daughter of the third Viscount Canterbury (Governor of Victoria 1866–73), by Georgiana, youngest daughter of Charles Tompson, of Witchingham Hall, Norfolk; and was created CMG in the 1883 Birthday Honours.
