= William Hackett (judge) =

Chief Justice of British Ceylon in 1877 and colonial administrator

Sir William Hackett

2nd Chief Justice of Fiji
- In office 1875–1876
- Preceded by: Sir Charles St Julian
- Succeeded by: Sir John Gorrie

12th Chief Justice of Ceylon
- In office 3 February 1877 – 1877
- Appointed by: William Henry Gregory
- Preceded by: Edward Shepherd Creasy
- Succeeded by: John Budd Phear

Personal details
- Born: 1824 Cork County Cork, Ireland
- Died: 17 May 1877 (aged 52–53) Colombo, British Colony of Ceylon
- Education: Trinity College Dublin

Sir William Bartholomew Hackett (1824 – 17 May 1877) was an Irish judge who was the second Chief Justice of Fiji and the 12th Chief Justice of Ceylon.

He was born in Cork, Ireland, the son of Bartholomew Hackett. He was educated at Stonyhurst College and Trinity College Dublin, graduating in 1846.

He became a member of the Irish Bar on the Munster circuit, was called to the bar at Lincoln's Inn in 1851 and practiced mainly at the Chancery Bar. In October 1861, he was appointed Queen's Advocate in Gold Coast acting as Chief Justice until confirmed in the position in April 1863. The following year, he was appointed Lieutenant-Governor of the Gold Coast. In 1866, he moved to south-east Asia to be Recorder of the Prince of Wales's Island (Penang Island). He was knighted on his appointment as Recorder, and in 1871, was appointed Acting Chief Justice of the Straits Settlements.

After heading up the courts as Chief Justice of Fiji from 1875 to 1876, he was appointed Chief Justice of Ceylon on 3 February 1877, to fill the vacancy created by the retirement of Edward Shepherd Creasy. He remained Chief Justice for only a few months as he died in 1877 of cholera while in office. He was succeeded by Sir John Budd Phear.

Legal offices
Preceded by Edward Shepherd Creasy	Chief Justice of Ceylon; 1877	Succeeded by John Budd Phear
