= Bruce Burnside =

Chief Justice of British Ceylon from 1883 to 1893

Sir Bruce Burnside

16th Chief Justice of Ceylon
- In office 21 May 1883 – 1893
- Appointed by: James Robert Longden
- Preceded by: Jacobus de Wet
- Succeeded by: John Winfield Bonser

15th Queen's Advocate of Ceylon
- In office 24 October 1879 – 1883
- Governor: James Robert Longden
- Preceded by: Richard Cayley
- Succeeded by: Francis Flemming

Personal details
- Born: 26 July 1833 Nassau, Bahamas
- Died: 10 August 1909 (aged 76) Kent, Surrey, England
- Spouse: Mary Elizabeth Francis
- Children: Frederick K. Burnside; Eustace A. Burnside; Robert Bruce Burnside; Edmund Burnside; Bertram W. Burnside; Ida M. Burnside; Lilla Burnside; Frederick R. Burnside

Sir Bruce Lockhart Burnside (26 July 1833 – 11 August 1909) was a Bahamian lawyer and politician.

He served as a Member of Parliament, Solicitor-General and Attorney-General of the Bahama Islands, later becoming the 25th Queen's Advocate of Ceylon and the 16th Chief Justice of Ceylon.

== Early life and education ==
Burnside was born in Nassau, the second son of Hon. John James Burnside, one time Surveyor-General of the Bahamas and his wife, Mary.

Burnside was called to the Bar at Lincoln's Inn in 1856. He was called to the bar on 30 April 1856.

== Legal and political career ==
=== Bahamas ===
Burnside returned to Nassau and established himself in legal practice. He became a member of the House of Assembly of the Bahamas in 1859.

During the American Civil War, he served as a legal adviser to the Confederate States.

In 1864, Burnside was appointed Solicitor-General of the Bahamas on 26 May. He served as the Speaker of the House of Assembly from November 1866 to February 1867. He also served at various times as Acting Attorney-General. He was appointed to the Executive Council in 1866, and subsequently to the Legislative Council in 1872 and appointed Attorney-General in 1875 on 3 September.

=== Chief Justice of Ceylon ===
In 1879, Burnside was appointed Queen's Advocate in Ceylon.

Four years later, he was appointed Chief Justice of Ceylon on 21 May 1883 succeeding Jacobus de Wet and served as Chief Justice until 1889. He was succeeded by John Winfield Bonser.

== Honours and awards ==
In 1874, Burnside was made Queen's Counsel. He was knighted in 1884.

== Personal life and death ==
Burnside died in England on 11 August 1909. He was survived by his wife, Mary. One son, Robert Bruce Burnside, was a judge on the Supreme Court of Western Australia. Another son was the colonial administrator, Edmund Burnside.

Legal offices
Preceded by Jacobus de Wet	Chief Justice of Ceylon; 1883-1889	Succeeded by John Winfield Bonser
Preceded by Richard Cayley	Queen's Advocate of Ceylon; 1879–1883	Succeeded by Francis Flemming
