= Anti-aircraft cruiser =

Military cruisers' subclass

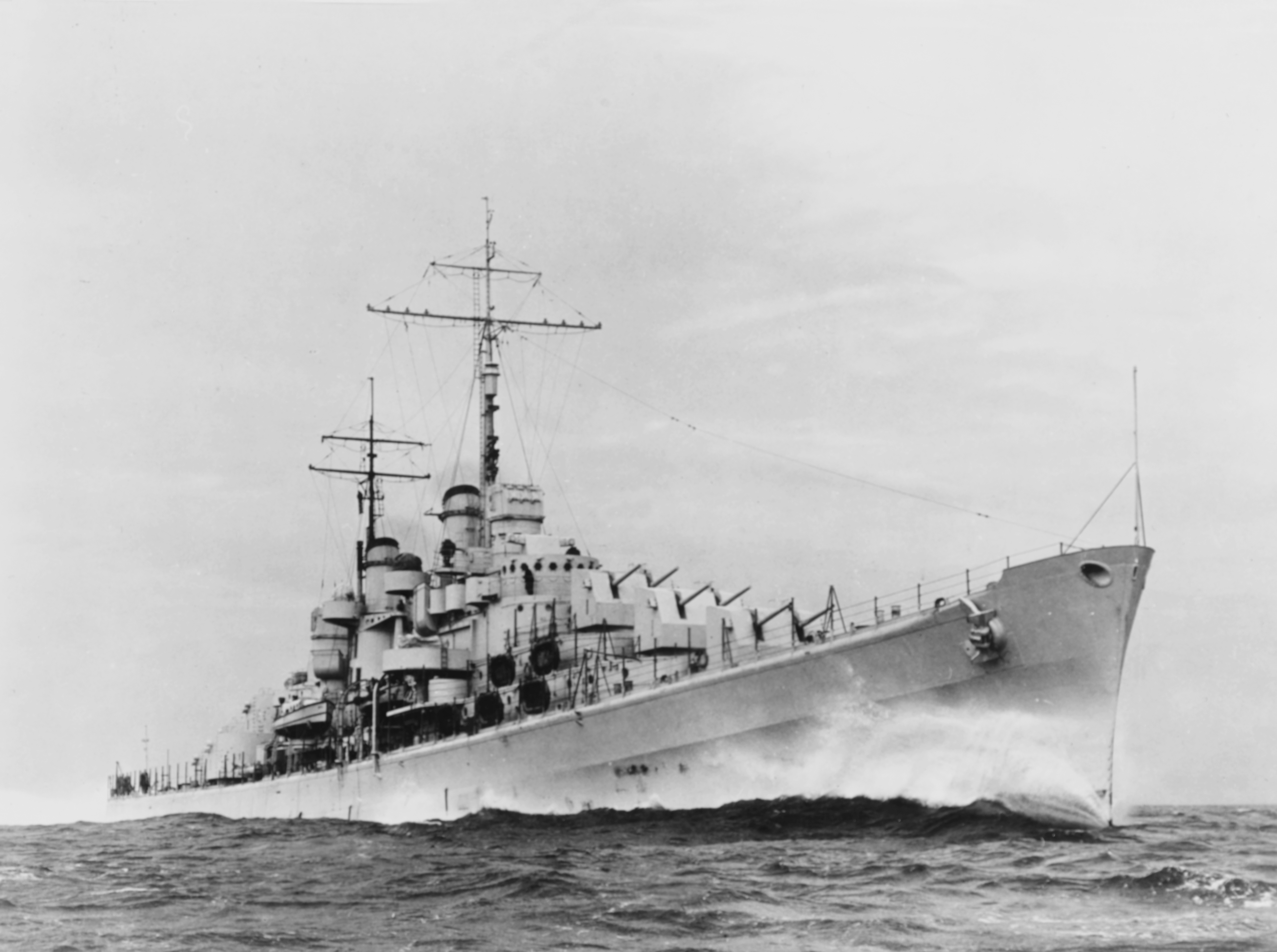
The air defense cruiser Atlanta

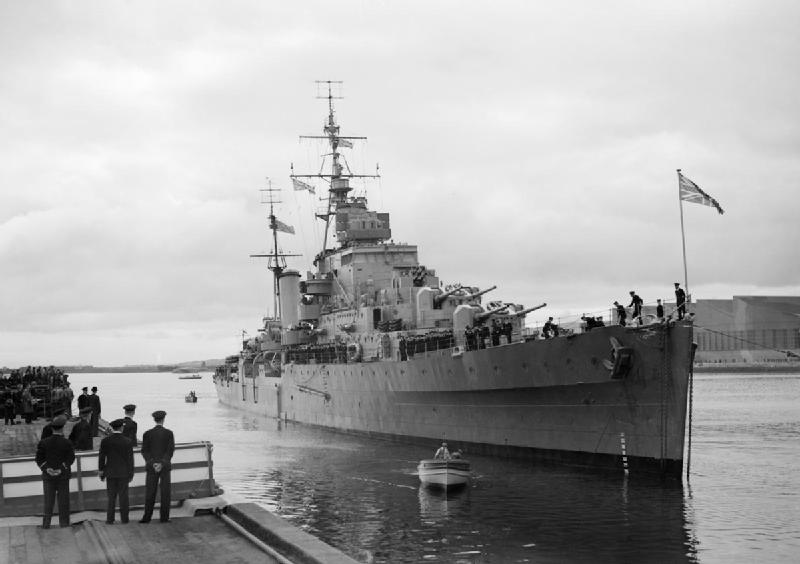
The cruiser Phoebe of the Dido class

An anti-aircraft cruiser (AAC) was a type of cruiser equipped with a main armament of dual-purpose guns optimized for anti-aircraft defense (AA) of naval formations. These ships were built or planned for construction in the navies of several countries during the 1930s to 1950s. They were actively used in battles during World War II.

The term "anti-aircraft cruiser" was rarely used in official naval classifications, effectively only for the American Atlanta-class cruisers, but experts traditionally categorize a group of light cruiser types from the United Kingdom, United States, France, Italy, and other nations as anti-aircraft cruisers.

Advancements in jet aviation and aircraft weaponry rendered large and medium-caliber anti-aircraft artillery less effective. The role of air defense ships shifted to ships equipped with surface-to-air missile systems, such as guided missile cruisers and destroyers.

== Emergence ==
The need for ships armed with powerful air defense systems was recognized by the navies of leading powers as early as the 1920s. Although aviation caused little damage to warships during World War I, its potential for development was evident, particularly to the aviation lobby, which held significant influence in countries like the United States and Great Britain.

However, a series of naval agreements in the 1920s and 1930s significantly altered the evolution of warship construction, including cruisers. Constrained by quantitative and qualitative limits, navies were reluctant to allocate scarce tonnage to specialized ships. Efforts were made to adapt main caliber guns for anti-aircraft fire, but the British failure with 203-millimeter (8 in) dual-purpose guns on Kent-class heavy cruisers ended such attempts.

Thus, the origins of the class arose from necessity. British admirals recognized the unsuitability of old C-class cruisers for their original purpose. With cruiser tonnage limited, they opted to convert these still-serviceable artillery platforms into air defense ships rather than scrap them.

Subsequently, Britain and later the United States developed the concept of an armored destroyer leader, capable of supporting destroyers, engaging enemy destroyers, and, with their dual-purpose guns, effectively combating aircraft.

The Second London Naval Treaty of 1936 also influenced naval perspectives, prohibiting heavy cruiser construction and limiting light cruiser displacement to 8,000 long tons (8,100 t). Fitting numerous 152 mm guns into such ships was impractical and compared to larger light cruisers like the Mogami, Brooklyn, and Southampton classes, they appeared weak. This spurred the development of light cruisers with dual-purpose main guns, later classified as anti-aircraft cruisers.

== British anti-aircraft cruisers ==
=== Light cruisers' upgrade ===
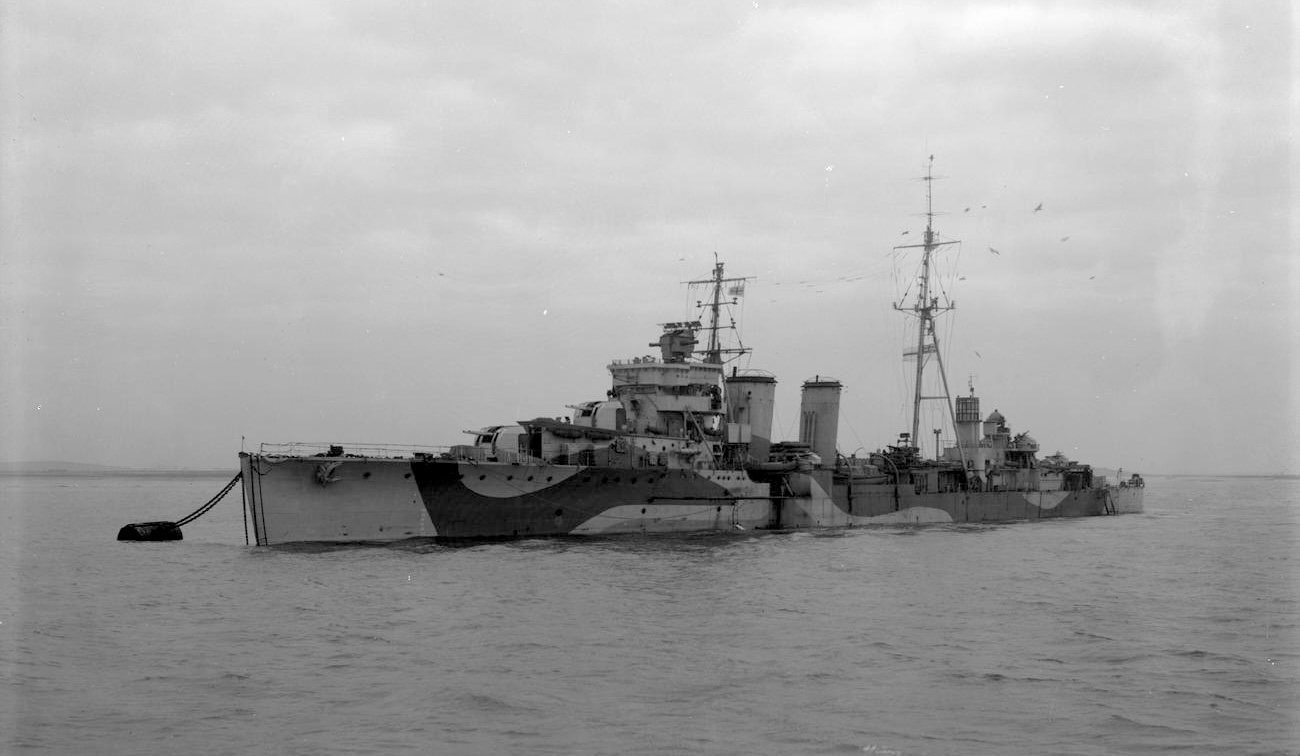
The light cruiser Caledon as an anti-aircraft cruiser, 1944.

By the early 1930s, light cruisers of the C class were outdated, prompting the Admiralty to convert all 13 surviving cruisers into specialized air defense ships.

Modernization began in 1935. The first to undergo conversion were HMS Coventry and HMS Curlew, from the Ceres subgroup. All previous armament was removed and replaced with ten single Mk V 102 mm (4 in) guns, supplemented by two eight-barreled 40 mm (1.6 in) Pom-pom guns. Due to a shortage of even these imperfect guns, the aft Pom-poms were removed in 1938–1939 and transferred to other ships.

The modernization program continued in 1938 with the conversion of HMS Cairo and HMS Calcutta (Cairo subgroup). Unlike their predecessors, they received four twin 102 mm Mk XIX mounts, complemented by a quadruple Pom-pom. Just before the war, modernization began on HMS Carlisle and HMS Curacoa, which were equipped similarly to the previous pair.

During the war, two more C-class cruisers, HMS Colombo and HMS Caledon, were converted. They received only three twin 102 mm mounts, but their anti-aircraft armament was enhanced with more effective Bofors and Oerlikon 20 mm (0.79 in) guns.

In the late 1930s, plans were made to convert all D-class cruisers into air defense ships, equipping them with four twin 114 mm (4 in) mounts and anti-aircraft guns. Although these plans were abandoned at the war's outbreak, one cruiser, HMS Delhi, was converted at New York City with American armament — five 5-inch (127 mm)/38-caliber guns and American fire control systems.

During World War II, all converted C-class cruisers actively participated in combat, typically tasked with providing air defense for convoys or protecting ports, such as during the Norwegian Campaign of 1940. In practice, these old ships were overwhelmed by the task. They could barely protect themselves from air attacks. Coventry, Curlew, and Calcutta were sunk by Luftwaffe bomber aircraft, while Carlisle was so heavily damaged by dive bombers that the ship was deemed not worth repairing. Cairo fell victim to a submarine. The most unusual fate befell Curacoa, which, on October 2, 1942, was cut in half by the ocean liner Queen Mary, which it was escorting, sinking with nearly its entire crew.

By the war's end, only Caledon, Colombo, and Delhi survived, all decommissioned in 1948.

=== Dido-class cruisers ===
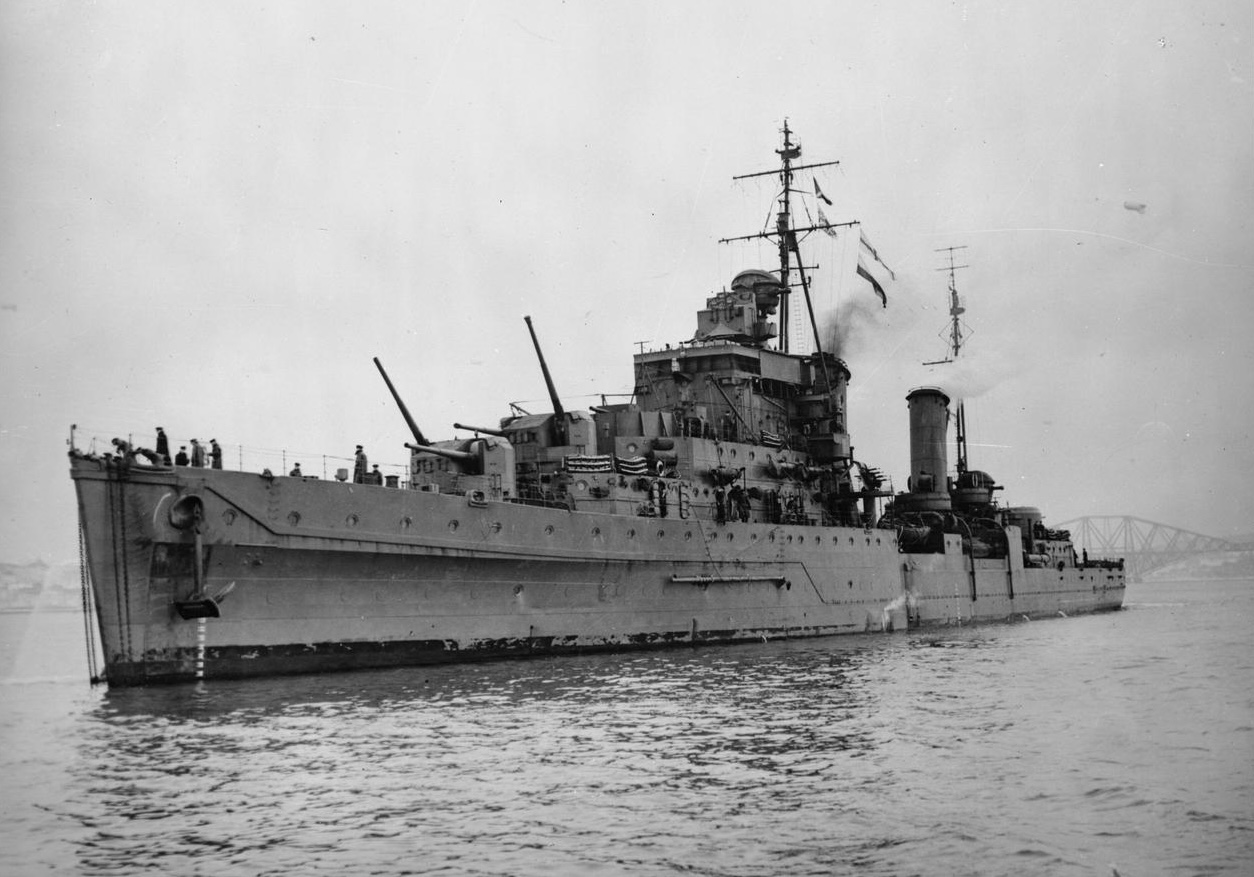
The light cruiser Dido

In 1934, the British Admiralty revisited the idea of a small cruiser for fleet service. The primary tasks were to operate with light forces, counter enemy destroyers, and provide air defense for naval formations. Eight design variants were proposed, but none satisfied the requirements.

The requirement was then set to equip the cruisers with dual-purpose main guns, equally suitable for engaging destroyers and conducting effective anti-aircraft fire. After a year of deliberation, QF 5.25-inch (133 mm) guns, still under development for the King George V-class battleships, were chosen.

The hull of the Dido class was derived from the Arethusa-class cruisers, but unlike them, they carried no seaplanes and had a reduced fuel capacity. Armor was minimal but sufficient to protect against destroyer fire.

The defining feature was the artillery. The design called for ten QF 5.25-inch guns in five turrets arranged in a superfiring layout – three forward and two aft. These guns had a 70° elevation angle and a theoretical firing rate of 10–12 rounds per minute. In practice, the rate was 7–8 rounds per minute, with inadequate elevation and traverse speeds, limiting their effectiveness against air targets.

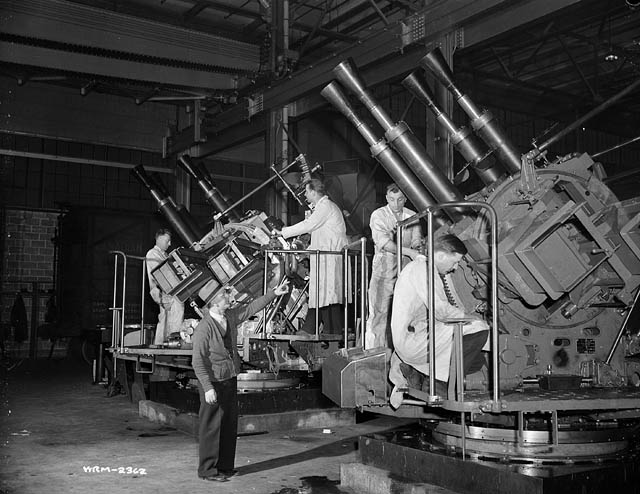
Quadruple 40 mm Pom-pom anti-aircraft gun

Two HACS Mk IV directors, later paired with Type 285 radars, controlled anti-aircraft fire. These systems, unstabilized and effective only in calm weather with skilled crews, performed poorly in rough seas. The smaller anti-aircraft armament, consisting of two quadruple 40 mm Vickers Pom-poms, had low muzzle velocity, insufficient range, and poor reliability. Large-caliber anti-aircraft machine guns, also included, proved nearly useless in combat.

Construction of the Dido-class cruisers began in 1937. Initially, six ships were ordered, later increased to 16. Wartime constraints led to variations in armament. The 5.25-inch gun turrets were prioritized for new battleships, so the first three cruisers carried only eight dual-purpose guns. The next six had the full armament, but Charybdis and Scylla lacked 5.25-inch guns, instead receiving eight 114 mm guns in twin shielded mounts.

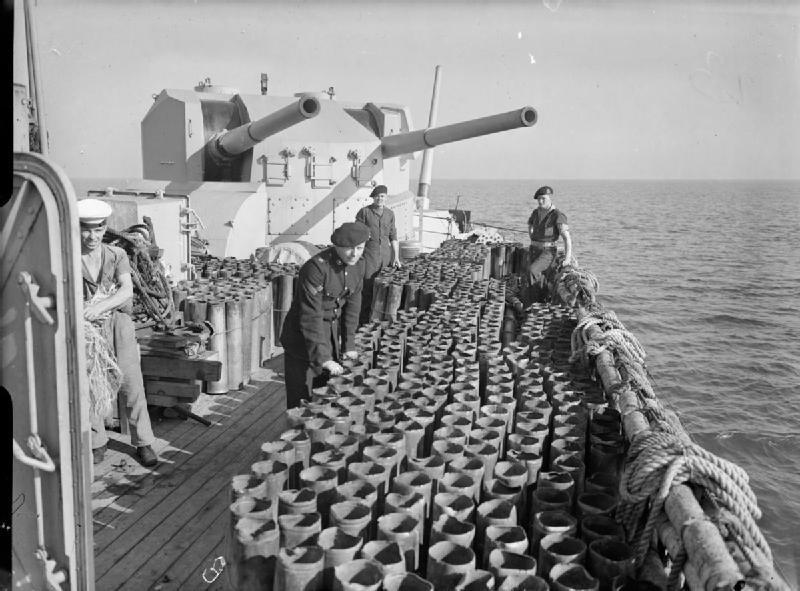
QF 5.25-inch guns of the Dido-class cruiser Sirius

During the war, all cruisers received enhanced anti-aircraft armament, primarily Oerlikon 20 mm guns and sometimes Bofors 40 mm guns. However, the small ships lacked space for additional anti-aircraft guns, and the forward-heavy design hindered operations in high latitudes. The final five cruisers were completed to the Improved Dido design.

The forward superfiring turret was replaced with a third quadruple Vickers Pom-pom. Fire control systems were improved, and lighter armament allowed enhanced magazine protection. Although displacement increased, seaworthiness improved, and speed remained unchanged.

During World War II, Dido-class cruisers operated actively across all theaters. They were moderately effective in convoy operations but not as fleet air defense assets. Against serious surface opponents, they were best avoided, as seen on December 25, 1940, when the German heavy cruiser Admiral Hipper attacked the British troop convoy WS 5A. However, on March 22, 1942, British anti-aircraft cruisers repelled the Italian battleship Littorio, supported by heavy cruisers, a success attributed to the low combat effectiveness of the Regia Marina.

Four Dido-class cruisers and one improved variant were lost: Bonaventure, Naiad, and Hermione were sunk by German submarine torpedoes, Charybdis by torpedoes from German torpedo boats, and Spartan by a German glide bomb.

Most Dido-class cruisers were decommissioned in the 1950s and 1960s. The longest-serving was Diadem, sold to Pakistan in 1956 and serving as Babur and later Jahangir until 1985.

=== Post-war anti-aircraft cruisers ===
At the war's end, dissatisfied with their ships' anti-aircraft capabilities, the British decided to develop a new type of anti-aircraft cruiser with heavy anti-aircraft guns. By 1947, this culminated in the Minotaur project. The ship was envisioned as large, with light armor and moderate speed. Its key feature was the main caliber artillery—ten QF Mk 26 152 mm guns in twin turrets, with an 80° elevation angle and a planned firing rate of 12–15 rounds per minute. These were complemented by eight twin 76 mm automatic mounts, intended to effectively engage air targets at long ranges. The Minotaur was essentially a smaller version of the American Worcester-class cruisers.

Post-war Britain's economic constraints prevented funding for construction. By 1951, a revised project was prepared, with standard displacement exceeding 15,000 tons. The Minotaur project was abandoned in 1952–1953.

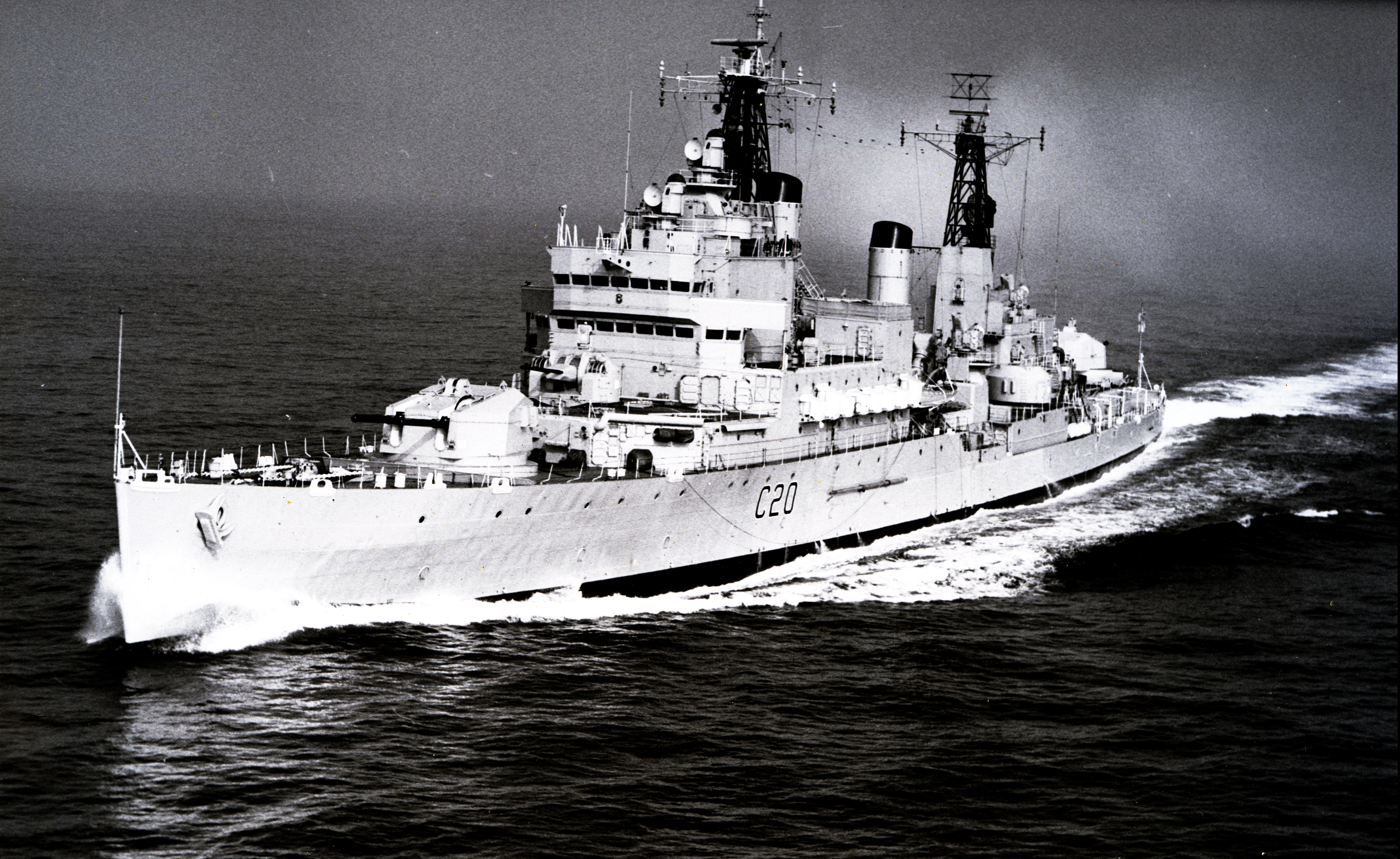
The light cruiser Tiger

A similar fate befell a light cruiser project prepared by 1949. It remained at the conceptual stage, with plans for 4,500-ton cruisers armed with prospective 127 mm guns.

In the late 1950s, British shipbuilders developed projects known as the 1960 cruisers—large, medium, and small. These designations were nominal, as even the small cruiser's displacement exceeded 10,000 tons. They were to be equipped with various combinations of 152 mm, 127 mm, and 76 mm dual-purpose guns, but were considered anachronistic by 1960, as superpower navies were adopting ships with guided missile weapons. British missile system development lagged, and purchasing American technology was avoided for prestige reasons.

Ultimately, scarce resources were not allocated to these outdated and costly ships. However, the Royal Navy received its final cruisers. Post-war, three incomplete Swiftsure-class cruisers, derived from the Colony class, were completed. Revised, they entered service between 1959 and 1961 as Tiger-class cruisers. Their armament included two twin QF Mk 26 mounts and three twin Mark 6 76 mm mounts. With a standard displacement of about 10,000 tons, the Tigers were underarmed and were the last artillery-only cruisers built worldwide.

Between 1965 and 1972, Tiger and Blake were converted into helicopter cruisers, housing four helicopters in a hangar where the aft 152 mm turret was removed. The Navy was satisfied, but the Treasury was displeased, as the second ship's conversion cost nearly 2.5 times more than the first. Consequently, Lion's conversion was abandoned due to funding shortages, and it served as an artillery cruiser until decommissioned in 1975.

Comparative specifications of British anti-aircraft cruisers
	Coventry	Cairo	Dido	Improved Dido	Tiger
Units Built	2	4	9	5	3
Full Displacement, tons	4,950–4,950	5,215–5,403	6,850–7,170	7,350–7,420	11,700
Main Guns	102 mm – 10×1	102 mm – 4×2	133 mm – 5×2	133 mm – 4×2	152 mm – 2×2
Anti-Aircraft Guns	40 mm – 1×8	40 mm – 1×4	40 mm – 2×4	40 mm – 3×4, 20-mm – 6×2	76 mm – 3×2
Belt Armor, mm	32–76	32–76	76	76	51
Deck Armor, mm	25	25	25–51	25–51	?
Main Gun Turret Armor, mm	—	—	13	13	76
Propulsion	Steam turbine, 40,000 shp (30,000 kW)	Steam turbine, 40,000 shp (30,000 kW)	Steam turbine, 62,000 shp (46,000 kW)	Steam turbine, 62,000 shp (46,000 kW)	Steam turbine, 80,000 shp (60,000 kW)
Maximum Speed, knots	29.5	29.5	32.25	32.25	31.5

== American anti-aircraft cruisers ==
=== Atlanta-class cruisers ===
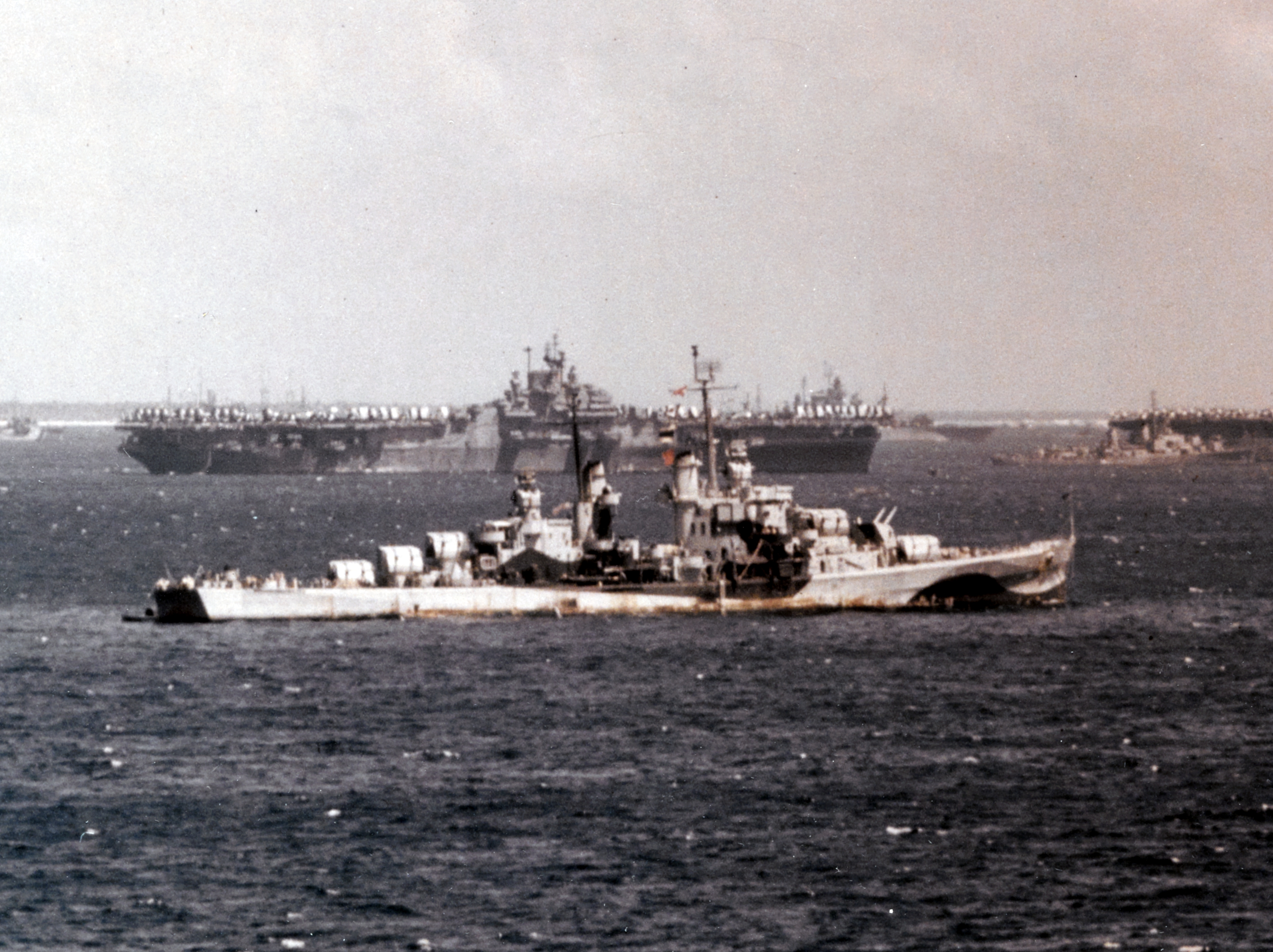
The light cruiser Flint, second series of the Atlanta class.

The development of Atlanta-class cruisers was necessitated by the Second London Naval Treaty of 1936, which limited new cruiser displacement to 8,000 tons. After reviewing 26 designs, plans for scaled-down Brooklyn-class cruisers were rejected. The United States Navy opted to build small cruisers for operations with destroyers.

Their main armament consisted of sixteen 5-inch (127 mm)/38-caliber guns, positioned along the centerline and sides. These guns, standard on American destroyers, had a high rate of fire but relatively light projectiles. A significant advantage was their equipping with new Mk 37 fire control directors, introduced in 1939, the most advanced anti-aircraft fire control system of World War II. Stabilized vertically and equipped with an electromechanical calculator, it performed well against piston aircraft, especially when paired with a radar. However, with only two directors, the Atlantas could not fulfill the role of fleet air defense ships, as they could effectively engage only two targets with their twelve to sixteen 5-inch guns. Against massed Japanese torpedo bombers and dive bombers, engaging targets at long ranges was critical, but the limited directors restricted effectiveness.

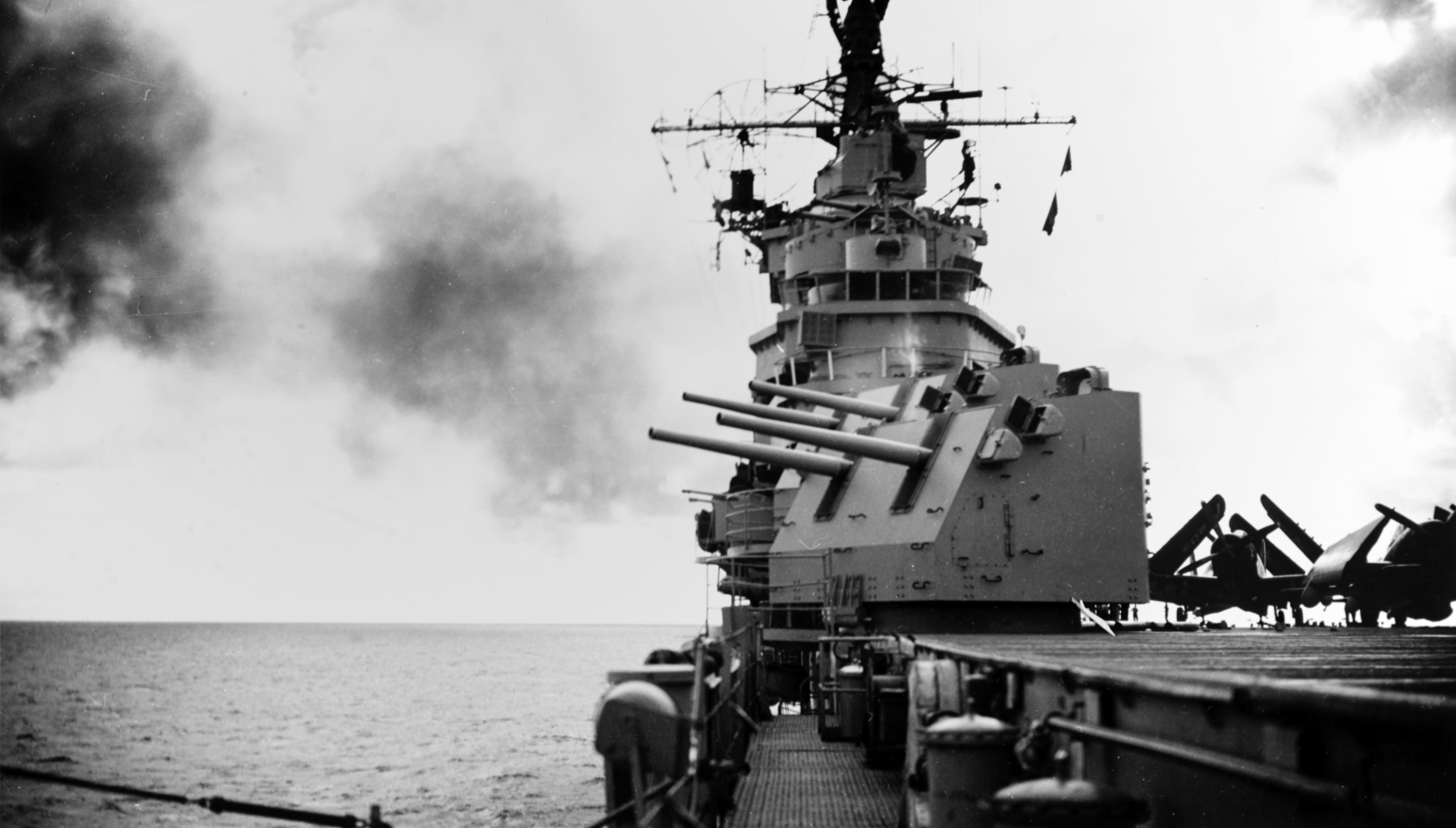
127 mm twin mount, the heavy anti-aircraft caliber of the U.S. Navy.

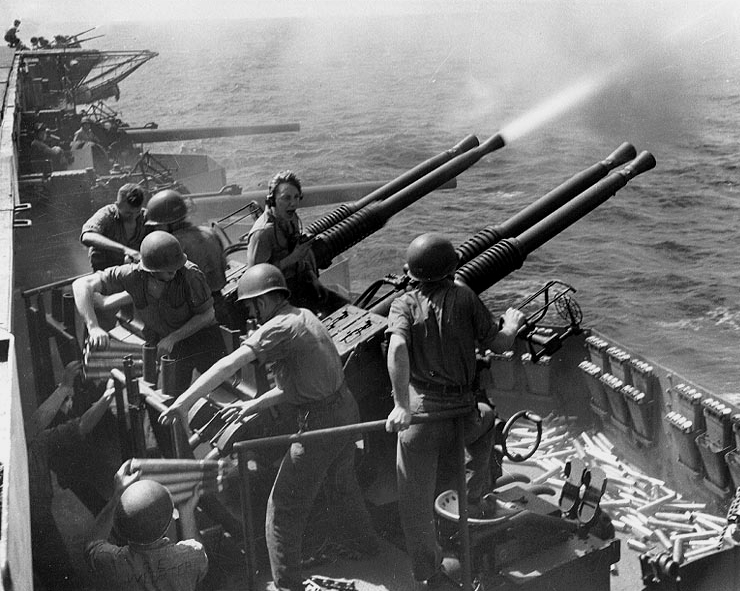
Quadruple 40 mm Bofors, the primary short-range air defense weapon of the U.S. Navy.

The 5-inch guns were supplemented by quadruple 1.1-inch (28 mm) anti-aircraft guns. Even during construction, these were considered too heavy and slow for close-in defense. As their primary role was to operate with destroyers, the ships carried torpedo tubes. Armor was modest, protecting reliably only against destroyer fire. The cruisers' performance was moderate, despite initial plans for a 40-knot speed.

Five cruisers were built to the original design. During the war, the 1.1-inch guns proved unreliable, and the need for rapid-fire automatic guns was acute. On the second series, side 5-inch gun turrets were removed and replaced with 40 mm Bofors guns, which also replaced all 1.1-inch guns. Four cruisers were built to this design.

In 1944, construction began on the final three Atlanta-class cruisers, forming the third series. Their superfiring 5-inch gun turrets were lowered one level, and torpedo tubes were removed as unnecessary. All entered service after World War II.

Overall, the project was not highly successful—lacking firepower and armor as cruisers and sufficient fire control systems as air defense ships. In their only major surface engagement on November 12, 1942, near Guadalcanal, Atlanta and Juneau were quickly disabled without inflicting damage on the Japanese.

Throughout the war, Atlanta-class cruisers were classified as light cruisers, receiving the anti-aircraft cruiser designation (CLAA – Cruiser Light Anti-Aircraft) in 1949. Atlanta and Juneau were lost during the war, with the rest decommissioned from the late 1950s. The last, Spokane, was scrapped in 1972.

=== Worcester-class cruisers ===
The Worcester-class project began in May 1941, influenced by successful German air attacks on British fleets off Norway and Crete. Although torpedo bombers and dive bombers posed the greatest threat, the goal was to protect against high-altitude horizontal bombing, justified by the effective German use of gliding bombs during the Allied invasion of Italy.

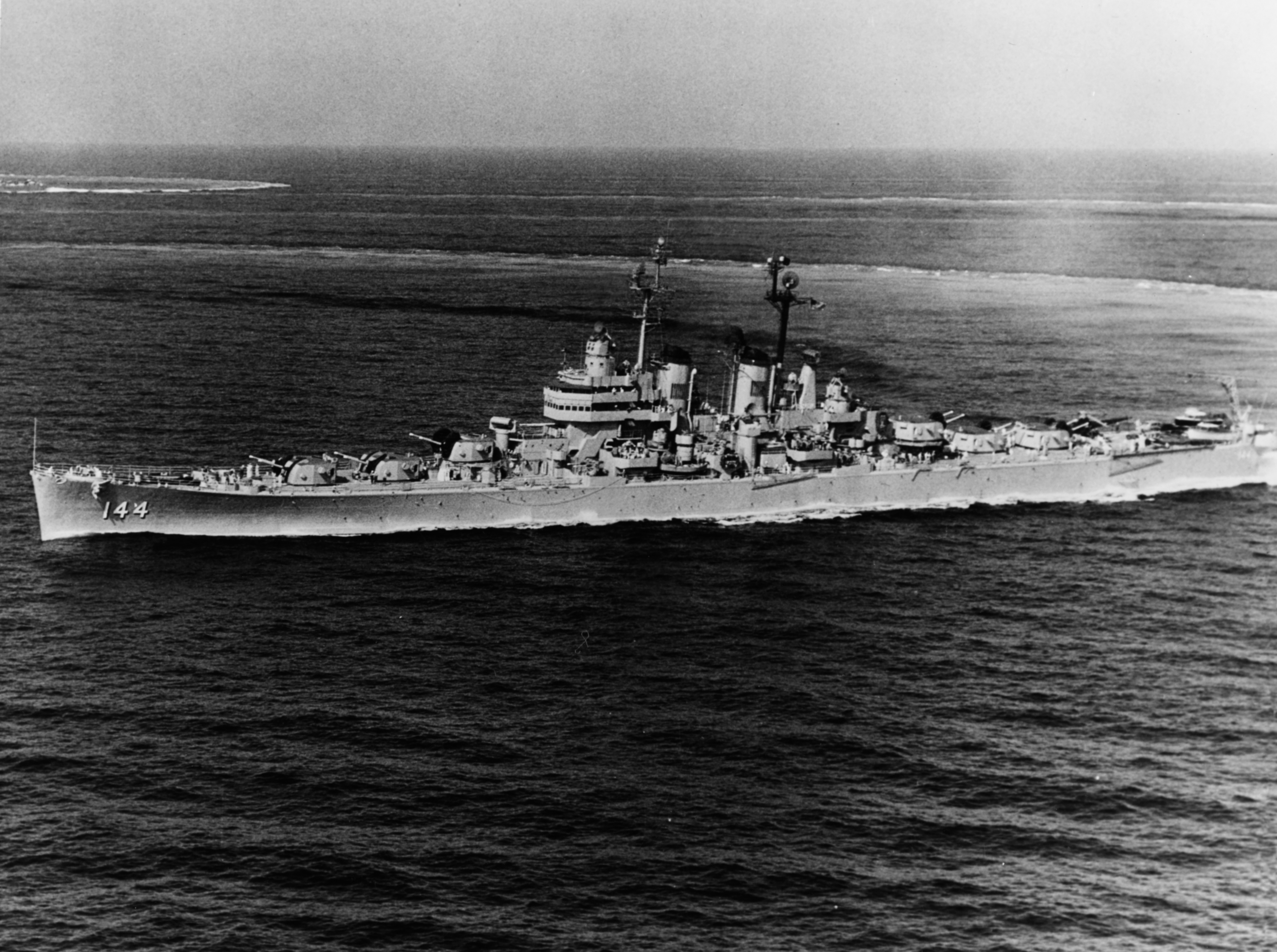
The light cruiser Worcester

Four cruisers were ordered, but only two were laid down in early 1945. Neither saw action in World War II, but Worcester served in the Korean War, used as a conventional cruiser for ground support. In the U.S. Navy, they were classified as light cruisers (CL).

The project prioritized armor and main caliber artillery. Designers focused on protection against air bombs, equipping the ships with two armored decks: an upper deck (22–25 mm, 0.87–0.98 in) to trigger bomb fuzes and a lower deck (89 mm, 3.5 in). The standout feature was the artillery—twelve 152 mm dual-purpose guns in six turrets, with a 78° elevation angle for effective anti-aircraft fire. The guns could briefly achieve 12 rounds per minute but were unreliable, with overly heavy and slow turrets. The main caliber was to be supplemented by 20 mm and 40 mm guns, but during construction, these were replaced with new 76 mm automatic guns. The anti-aircraft fire control system was advanced but inadequate for surface targets, though no specialized system was deemed necessary.

These innovations led to a significant displacement increase, reaching 18,500 long tons (18,800 t), earning the Worcester the nickname "very large light cruiser."

Worcester and its sister ship Roanoke were decommissioned in 1970 on the same day.

Comparative specifications of U.S. anti-aircraft cruisers
	Atlanta, series 1	Atlanta, series 2	Atlanta, series 3	Worcester
Units Built	4	4	3	2
Full Displacement, tons	8,100	8,100	8,450	18,500
Main Guns	127 mm – 8×2	127 mm – 6×2	127 mm – 6×2	152 mm – 6×2
Anti-Aircraft Guns	28 mm – 4×4, 20 mm – 8×1	40 mm – 8×2, 20 mm – 16×1	40 mm – 6×4 and 4×2, 20 mm – 6×2	76 mm – 11×2 and 2×1
Belt Armor, mm	95	95	95	76–127
Deck Armor, mm	32	32	32	89+22–25
Main Gun Turret Armor, mm	25–32	25–32	25–32	51–160
Propulsion	Steam turbine, 75,000 shp (56,000 kW)	Steam turbine, 75,000 shp (56,000 kW)	Steam turbine, 75,000 shp (56,000 kW)	Steam turbine, 120,000 shp (89,000 kW)
Maximum Speed, knots	32.5	32.5	32.5	33

== Italian anti-aircraft cruisers ==
In 1939, Italy laid down two small light cruisers of the Taksin class for Thailand. Due to the outbreak of World War II, construction progressed slowly, and in 1942, Italy requisitioned the incomplete cruisers, renaming them the Etna class. The design was radically revised to serve dual roles as anti-aircraft cruisers and fast troop transports.

For their new role, the cruisers were equipped with three twin 135 mm (5 in) gun turrets, capable of high elevation for anti-aircraft fire. These were complemented by ten single 65 mm (3 in) automatic guns and ten twin 20 mm automatic guns. The superstructures included troop accommodations, with cargo space in the holds.

Construction of Etna and Vesuvio proceeded slowly due to wartime difficulties. By the time Italy exited the war, their completion was limited. The Germans captured the incomplete cruisers in 1943, sinking them in shallow waters in 1944.

== Japanese anti-aircraft cruisers ==
In the mid-1930s, inspired by British experience, the Imperial Japanese Navy planned to convert the outdated light cruisers Tenryū and Tatsuta into anti-aircraft cruisers. The plan involved removing all existing artillery and installing four twin 127 mm dual-purpose gun mounts, supplemented by four triple 25 mm anti-aircraft guns, with two new anti-aircraft fire control directors.

Conversion was scheduled for 1937 but was postponed due to funding shortages. The project was revised in 1938, but with the onset of the Pacific War, modernization was canceled. The Imperial Japanese Navy's need for specialized air defense ships was met only by Akizuki-class destroyers.

== French anti-aircraft cruisers ==
In the late 1930s, the French Navy planned the De Grasse-class light cruisers. Only the lead ship was laid down before World War II, but construction was not completed. Work resumed in 1946 but was halted as the design was deemed outdated. The project was revised, and in 1956, De Grasse entered service as an anti-aircraft cruiser, armed with sixteen 127 mm dual-purpose guns in twin turrets at the ship's ends, complemented by ten twin 57 mm (2.2 in) Bofors guns. In 1966, De Grasse was converted into a command ship for France's nuclear test center, serving until decommissioned in 1973.

A slightly modified design produced another anti-aircraft cruiser, Colbert, commissioned in 1959. Its armament mirrored De Grasse. Between 1970 and 1972, Colbert underwent a major modernization, replacing its dual-purpose guns with two 100 mm (4 in) automatic guns, reducing 57 mm guns by 40%, and adding Masurca surface-to-air missiles (SAM) and Exocet anti-ship missiles. Colbert was decommissioned in 1991.

== Anti-aircraft cruisers of smaller European nations ==
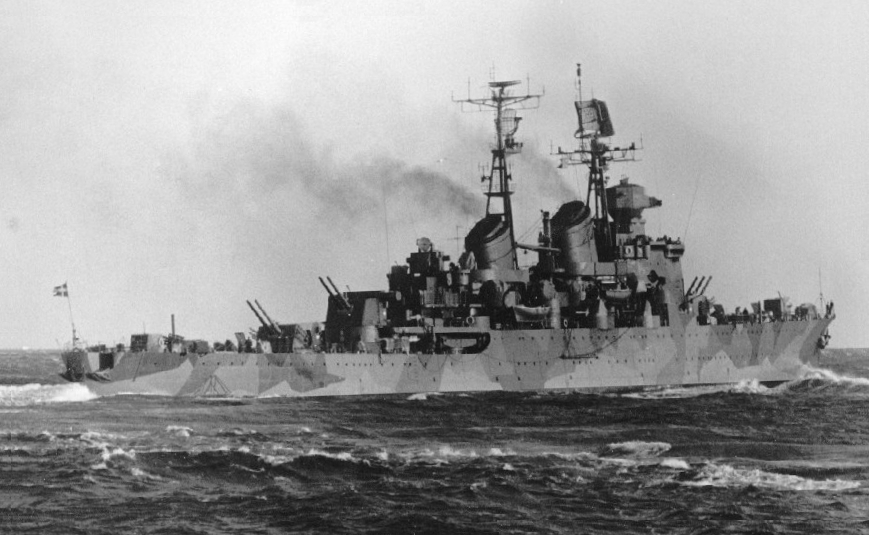
The light cruiser Göta Lejon of the Tre Kronor class

In 1947, the Swedish Navy commissioned two Tre Kronor-class light cruisers. Their defining feature, qualifying them as anti-aircraft cruisers, was their Bofors-designed main caliber artillery. The 152 mm guns had automatic loading, achieving a 15-round-per-minute rate and a 70° elevation angle for anti-aircraft fire. Lacking conventional medium-caliber dual-purpose guns, they were complemented by 40 mm and 20 mm automatic guns.

These cruisers were the largest ships in the Swedish Navy for years. Tre Kronor was decommissioned in 1964, and Göta Lejon was slated for decommissioning in 1970 but was sold to Chile in 1971, serving as Almirante Latorre until 1984.

The Royal Netherlands Navy's De Zeven Provinciën-class cruisers are also considered anti-aircraft cruisers, with some caveats. Laid down before World War II, they were completed post-war to a revised design. Their main caliber consisted of Bofors 152 mm guns with a 60° elevation angle, allowing limited anti-aircraft fire, supplemented by Swedish 57 mm and 40 mm automatic guns. Commissioned in 1953, De Zeven Provinciën underwent major modernization in 1962–1964, losing its aft main turrets and some anti-aircraft guns but gaining a Terrier SAM launcher.

In 1973, both cruisers were sold to Peru. The SAM system was removed from De Zeven Provinciën, replaced with a hangar for three helicopters, resembling the British Blake-class cruisers. Under new names, they served into the 21st century, with Almirante Grau (formerly De Ruyter) decommissioned in 2005, the last light cruiser worldwide.

Comparative specifications of European anti-aircraft cruisers
	Etna	De Grasse	Colbert	Tre Kronor	De Zeven Provinciën
Country	Kingdom of Italy	France	France	Sweden	Netherlands
Units Built	2	1	1	2	2
Full Displacement, tons	5,900	11,545	11,100	9,200	11,850
Main Guns	135 mm – 3×2	127 mm – 8×2	127 mm – 8×2	152 mm – 1×3 and 2×2	152 mm – 4×2
Anti-Aircraft Guns	65 mm – 10×1, 20 mm – 10×2	57 mm – 10×2	57 mm – 10×2	40 mm – 10×2 and 7×1	57 mm – 4×2, 40 mm – 8×1
Belt Armor, mm	60	?	50–80	70–80+20	75–100
Deck Armor, mm	20–35	?	50	30+30	20–25
Main Gun Turret Armor, mm	20	?	?	50–125	50–100
Propulsion	Steam turbine, 40,000 shp (30,000 kW)	Steam turbine, 110,000 shp (82,000 kW)	Steam turbine, 87,000 shp (65,000 kW)	Steam turbine, 90,000 shp (67,000 kW)	Steam turbine, 85,000 shp (63,000 kW)
Maximum Speed, knots	28	33	33	33	32

== Soviet anti-aircraft cruiser projects ==
The Soviet Navy showed interest in cruisers with dual-purpose main guns. Between 1939 and 1941, OKB-196 developed the MK-6 small light cruiser project. The 7,800-ton ship was to be equipped with five twin MK-18 130 mm dual-purpose gun mounts, with an 85° elevation angle, unitary loading, and fully automated ammunition supply.

The Project 47 ship, officially a destroyer leader, was effectively a light cruiser. With over 5,000 tons displacement, it was to carry five twin 130 mm dual-purpose gun mounts, 37 mm anti-aircraft guns, deck and belt armor, and achieve 34 knots (63 km/h; 39 mph). It differed from the MK-6 only by lacking a catapult and seaplane. In April 1941, Project 47 was canceled, as its specifications required a light cruiser's size.

Post-World War II, the Soviet Navy revisited the concept. TsKB-17 proposed a small light cruiser (MLK) in six variants, four with 8–16 130 mm dual-purpose guns in twin or quadruple BL-109 or BL-110 turrets. Designed by OKB-172, these guns had an 83° elevation angle and a 15-round-per-minute rate. The MLK had light armor, displacement of 8,500–10,000 tons, and speeds of 33–35 knots (61–65 km/h; 38–40 mph).

In 1954, development began on the Project 84 light cruiser. With a 14,000–15,000-ton displacement, it was to achieve 32–33 knots (59–61 km/h; 37–38 mph), carry eight 180 mm (7 in) SM-45 dual-purpose guns in twin turrets, twelve 100 mm dual-purpose guns, 57 mm automatic guns, and two helicopters. Unlike the Project 26 cruisers' semi-automatic loading, the new guns used separate-case loading at any elevation angle, with a 76° maximum and 9–10 rounds per minute, reaching 23,000 meters (75,000 ft) vertically.

Five cruisers were planned for commissioning in 1964–1965, but work ceased in 1956 during the preliminary design phase.

== Bibliography ==
- Nenakhov, Yu. Yu. (2007). Энциклопедия крейсеров 1910—2005 [Encyclopedia of Cruisers 1910–2005]. Minsk: Harvest. ISBN 978-5-17-030194-2.
- Patyanin, S. V.; Dashyan, A. V. (2007). Крейсера Второй мировой. Охотники и защитники [Cruisers of World War II: Hunters and Protectors]. Moscow: Yauza, Eksmo. ISBN 978-5-699-19130-7.
- Conway's All the World's Fighting Ships, 1922—1946. London: Conway Maritime Press. 1980. ISBN 0-85177-146-7.
- Conway's All the World's Fighting Ships, 1947—1995. Annapolis, Maryland, U.S.A.: Naval Institute Press. 1996. ISBN 1-55750-132-7.
- Osborne, E. W. (2004). Cruisers and Battle cruisers. An illustrated history of their impact. Denver, USA: ABC-CLIO. ISBN 1-85109-369-9.
- Smith, P. C.; Dominy, J. R. (1981). Cruisers in Action 1939—1945. London: William Kimber. p. 320. ISBN 0718302184.
- Whitley, M. J. (1995). Cruisers of World War Two. An international encyclopedia. London: Arms & Armour. ISBN 1-85409-225-1.
