= HMS Colombo =

Royal Navy C-class light cruiser

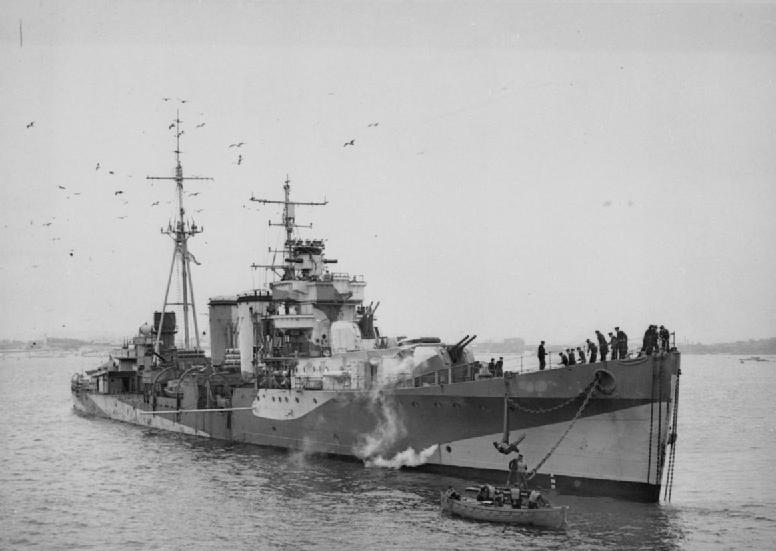
- As an anti-aircraft ship, July 1943

History

United Kingdom
- Name: HMS Colombo
- Builder: Fairfield Shipbuilding and Engineering Company
- Laid down: 8 December 1917
- Launched: 18 December 1918
- Commissioned: 18 June 1919
- Refit: Converted into anti-aircraft cruiser, June 1942 – March 1943
- Identification: Pennant number: 7A (Jun 19); 89 (Nov 19); I.89 (1936); D.89 (1940)
- Fate: Sold for scrap, 22 January 1948

General characteristics (as built)
- Class & type: C-class light cruiser
- Displacement: 4,290 long tons (4,359 t)
- Length: 425 ft (129.5 m) p/p; 451 ft 6 in (137.6 m) o/a
- Beam: 43 ft 6 in (13.3 m)
- Draught: 15 ft 6 in (4.72 m)
- Installed power: 40,000 shp (30,000 kW); 6 × Yarrow boilers
- Propulsion: 2 × shafts; 2 × geared steam turbines
- Speed: 29 kn (54 km/h; 33 mph)
- Complement: 432
- Armament: 5 × single BL 6 in (152 mm) Mk XII guns; 2 × single QF 3 in (76 mm) 20-cwt (Note: "Cwt" is the abbreviation for hundredweight, 20 cwt referring to the weight of the gun.) anti-aircraft guns; 4 × twin 21 in (533 mm) torpedo tubes
- Armour: Waterline belt: 1.25–3 in (32–76 mm); Deck: 1 in (25 mm); Conning tower: 3 in

HMS Colombo was a C-class light cruiser built for the Royal Navy during World War I. She was part of the Carlisle sub-class of the C class. She survived both world wars to be scrapped in 1948.

== Design and description ==
The Carlisle sub-class was identical with the preceding Ceres sub-class except that their bows were raised for better seakeeping. The ships were 451 feet 6 inches (137.6 m) long overall, with a beam of 43 feet 6 inches (13.3 m) and a mean draught of 15 feet 6 inches (4.7 m). Displacement was 4,290 long tons (4,360 t) at normal and 5,250 long tons (5,330 t) at deep load. Columbo was powered by two Brown-Curtis steam turbines, each driving one propeller shaft, which produced a total of 40,000 indicated horsepower (30,000 kW). The turbines used steam generated by six Yarrow boilers which gave her a speed of about 29 knots (54 km/h; 33 mph). She carried 935 long tons (950 t) tons of fuel oil. The ship had a crew of about 432 officers and ratings.

The armament of the Carlisle sub-class consisted of five BL 6-inch (152 mm) Mk XII guns that were mounted on the centreline. One superfiring pair of guns was forward of the bridge, one was aft of the two funnels and the last two were in the stern, with one gun superfiring over the rearmost gun. The two QF 3-inch (76 mm) 20-cwt anti-aircraft guns were positioned abreast of the fore funnel. The ships were equipped with eight 21 in (533 mm) torpedo tubes in four twin mounts, two on each broadside.

On refitting to the role of an anti-aircraft (AA) cruiser 1942-43 her new armament comprised 3 twin mounting of 4-inch AA guns; two twin mountings of 40 mm AA guns and fourteen 20 mm AA guns.

== Construction and war service ==
Colombo, named after the former capital city of Ceylon, now Sri Lanka, was laid down by Fairfield Shipbuilding and Engineering Company on 8 December 1917, and launched on 18 December 1918. She was commissioned too late to see action in the First World War, but went on to serve in the Second World War. In the interwar period she served in the Far East with the Eastern Fleet between June 1919 to 1926, before being reassigned to the North American and West Indies Station. The ship returned to the Eastern Fleet from July 1932 to 1935, before returning to the UK to be put into reserve.

Colombo spent the early part of the war in service with the Home Fleet, during which time she captured the German merchant ship Henning Oldendorff south-east of Iceland. She then returned to the Eastern Fleet between August 1940 and June 1942 before again returning to the UK to undergo a refit and conversion into an anti-aircraft cruiser between June 1942 and March 1943. Colombo survived the war and was sold on 22 January 1948, arriving at the yards of Cashmore, Newport on 13 May 1948 to be broken up.

== Bibliography ==
- Dodson, Aidan (2024). "The Development of the British Royal Navy's Pennant Numbers Between 1919 and 1940". Warship International. 61 (2). ISSN 0043-0374.
- Preston, Antony (1985). "Great Britain and Empire Forces". In Gray, Randal (ed.). Conway's All the World's Fighting Ships 1906–1921. Annapolis, Maryland: Naval Institute Press. pp. 1–104. ISBN 0-85177-245-5.
- Whitley, M. J. (1995). Cruisers of World War Two: An International Encyclopedia. London: Cassell. ISBN 1-86019-874-0.
