= 1883 Birthday Honours =

National awards given by Queen Victoria

The 1883 Birthday Honours were appointments by Queen Victoria to various orders and honours to reward and highlight good works by citizens of the British Empire. The appointments were made to celebrate the official birthday of the Queen, and were published in The London Gazette on 24 May 1883.

The recipients of honours are displayed here as they were styled before their new honour, and arranged by honour, with classes (Knight, Knight Grand Cross, etc.) and then divisions (Military, Civil, etc.) as appropriate.

== United Kingdom and British Empire ==
=== Knight Bachelor ===
- Jacobus Petrus de Wet, formerly recorder of Griqualand West and chief justice of the Transvaal, and lately acting chief justice of the island of Ceylon
- Roderick William Cameron, commissioner for Canada to the Australian International Exhibitions
- Alfred Roberts, honorary secretary and consulting surgeon to Prince Alfred Hospital, Sydney, New South Wales

=== The Most Distinguished Order of Saint Michael and Saint George ===
Star of the Order of Saint Michael and Saint George

==== Knight Grand Cross of the Order of St Michael and St George (GCMG) ====
- The Right Honourable Lord Blachford PC KCMG formerly Under Secretary of State for the Colonies
- Sir Henry Ernest Bulwer KCMG Governor of the Colony of Natal
- Sir James Robert Longden KCMG Governor of the Island of Ceylon

==== Knight Commander of the Order of St Michael and St George (KCMG) ====
- Colonel Charles Warren, Royal Engineers CMG in recognition of his services in connection with the bringing to justice the murderers of the late Professor Palmer and his party
- William Robinson CMG Governor of the Windward Islands
- George William Des Vœux CMG Governor of the Colony of Fiji
- Colonel Robert William Harley CB CMG Lieutenant-Governor of the Colony of British Honduras
- Charles Cameron Lees CMG Governor of the Bahama Islands
- Frederick Palgrave Barlee CMG lately Lieutenant-Governor of the Colony of British Honduras
- John Douglas CMG Lieutenant-Governor and Colonial Secretary of the Island of Ceylon
- Charles Hutton Gregory CMG Past President of the Institution of Civil Engineers, Consulting Engineer to several Colonial Governments
- Lieutenant-Colonel Charles Bullen Hugh Mitchell CMG, Royal Marines, Colonial Secretary, and lately Administrator of the Government of Natal
- Hugh Low CMG British Resident at Perak, in the Malay Peninsula
- William Morgan, for some time First Minister of the Colony of South Australia
- Ambrose Shea, for many years Member, and sometime Speaker of the Legislative Assembly of the Colony of Newfoundland

==== Companion of the Order of St Michael and St George (CMG) ====
- Michael Henry Gallwey, Attorney-General of Natal
- Major-General Saverio Gatt, late of the Royal Malta Fencible Artillery
- Colonel Edward Osborne Hewett, Royal Engineers, Commandant of the Royal Military College in the Dominion of Canada
- The Honourable Walter Francis Hely-Hutchinson, Chief Secretary to the Government of Malta
- John Francis Julius Von Haast FRS Member of the Senate of the University of New Zealand
- Edward Laborde, Colonial Secretary and Administrator of the Government of the Island of Tobago
- Macnamara Dix, Colonial Treasurer of Saint Lucia
- Charles Brownlee, Chief Magistrate, Griqualand East
- John Frederick Dickson, Government Agent and Fiscal for the North Central Province of the Island of Ceylon
- Charles Bright, of the Colony of Victoria
