= Edward Grasett =

British Army general (1888–1971)

Lieutenant-General Sir Edward Grasett KBE CB DSO MC
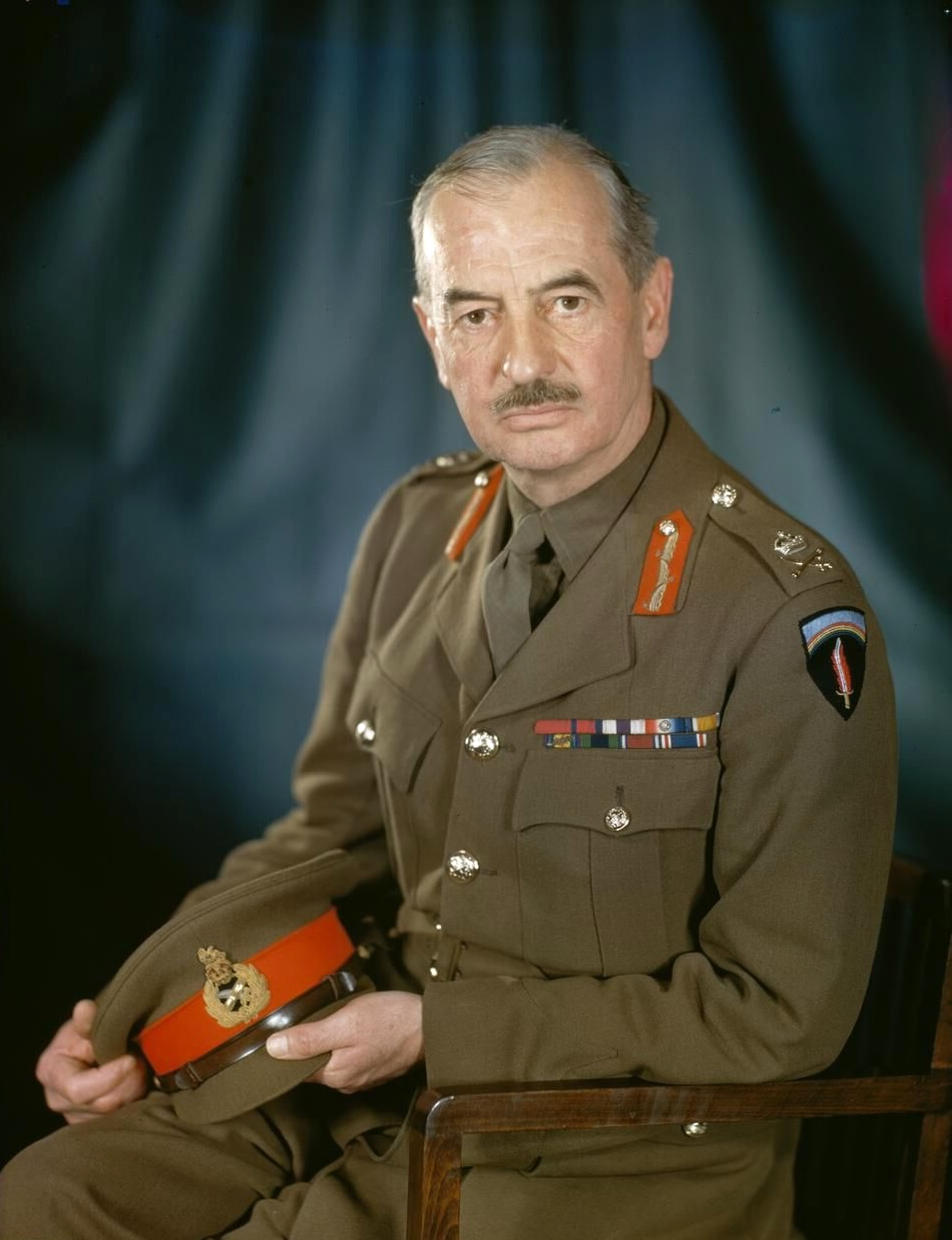
- Grasett in 1944
- Born: 20 October 1888; Plymouth, Devon, England
- Died: 4 December 1971 (aged 83); Banbury, Oxfordshire, England
- Burial place: Cathedral Church of St. James in Toronto, Canada
- Military career
- Allegiance: United Kingdom
- Branch: British Army
- Service years: 1909–1947
- Rank: Lieutenant-General
- Service number: 6855
- Unit: Royal Engineers
- Commands: VIII Corps; 48th (South Midland) Infantry Division; British Troops in China
- Awards: Knight Commander of the Order of the British Empire; Companion of the Order of the Bath; Distinguished Service Order; Military Cross; Mentioned in Despatches (5); Chief Commander of the Legion of Merit (United States)

Lieutenant-General Sir Arthur Edward Grasett, KBE, CB, DSO, MC (20 October 1888 – 4 December 1971) was a British-Canadian soldier who served with the British Army in Canada, the United Kingdom, British India and China.

== Early life and education ==
Grasett was born on 20 October 1888 in Plymouth, the eldest son of Arthur Wanton Grasett of Toronto, Ontario, and Catharine Frances Hewett of Halifax, Nova Scotia, daughter of Army officer Edward Osborne Hewett. He was educated at Upper Canada College in Toronto. He enrolled at the Royal Military College of Canada in Kingston, Ontario in 1906.

== Military career ==
Grasett was commissioned into the Royal Engineers on 24 June 1909. He was promoted to lieutenant on 4 February 1911.

He served with distinction during the First World War, earning the Military Cross (MC) in 1915, the Distinguished Service Order (DSO) in 1918, and was five times mentioned in despatches.

The war now over, he then attended the Staff College, Camberley from 1920 to 1921. He served on operations on the North West Frontier of India from 1921 and then as a General Staff Officer at the Staff College from 1935. As a brigadier, a rank he had been promoted to in April 1937, he served on the General Staff in the headquarters of Northern Command from 1937 and was promoted to major general in September 1938 (with seniority backdated to 9 January 1938) and soon after was appointed Commander of British Troops in China in 1938.

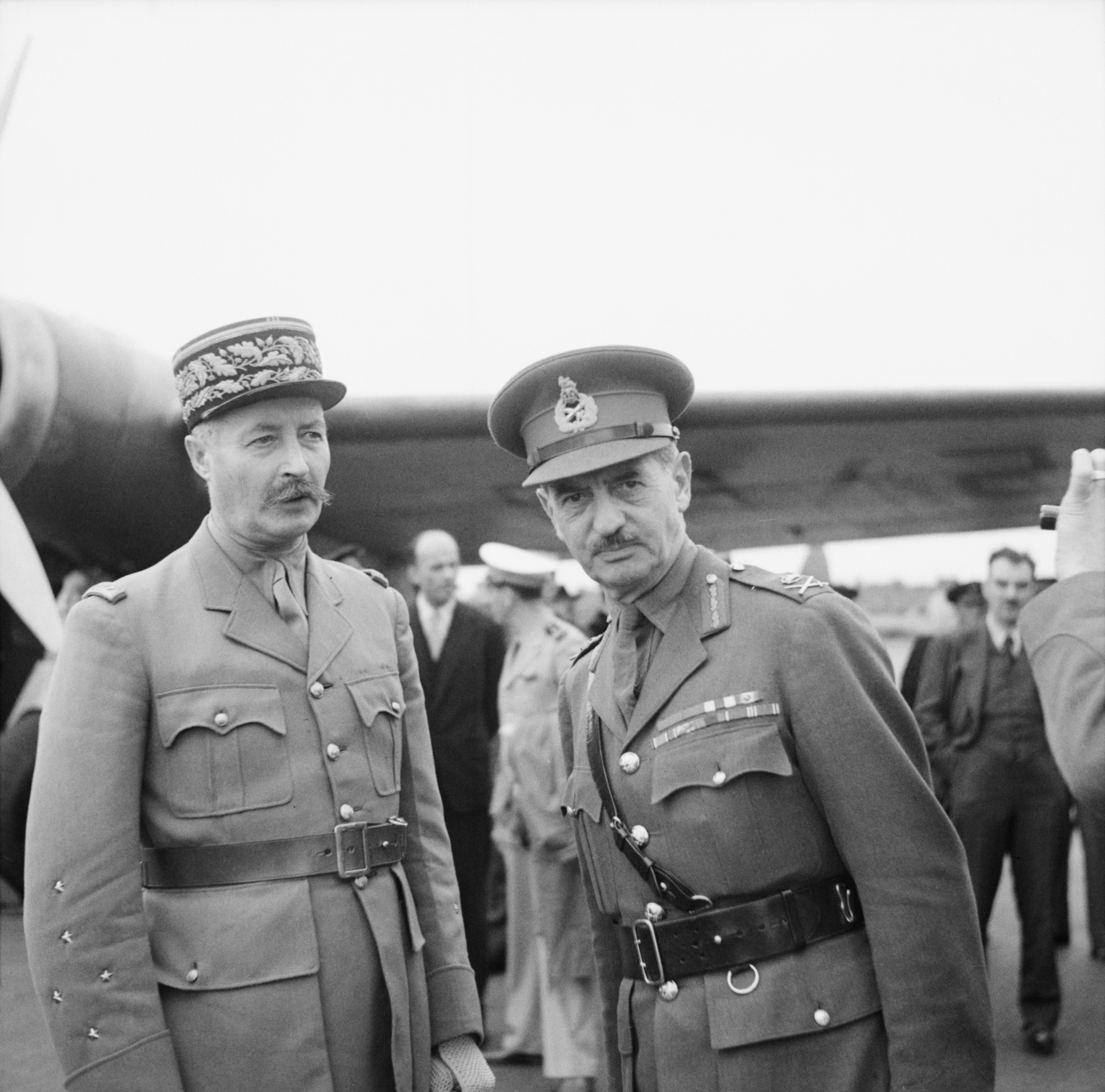
General Henri Giraud, joint President (with Charles de Gaulle) of the French Committee of National Liberation in 1943, with Lieutenant General A. E. Grasett arriving in England.

Grasett served in the Second World War as General Officer Commanding (GOC) of the 48th (South Midland) Division from 1941 and, promoted to acting lieutenant general on 7 November 1941, was made GOC of VIII Corps on the south coast of England from November 1941. His lieutenant general's rank was made temporary in November 1942. In 1944 he was posted to the War Office in London and served as Chief of the European Allied Contact Section of the Supreme Headquarters Allied Expeditionary Force under General Dwight D. Eisenhower from 1944 to 1945. He was appointed Lieutenant Governor of Jersey and Colonel Commandant of the Royal Engineers in 1945 and retired from the army in 1947.

== Awards and recognition ==
- Knight Commander of the Order of the British Empire (1945)
- Companion of the Order of the Bath (16 July 1940)
- Distinguished Service Order (5 June 1919)
- Military Cross (17 January 1916)
- Order of the Red Banner (Soviet Union; 21 June 1945)
- Chief Commander of the Legion of Merit (United States; 8 November 1945)
- Grand Cross of the Order of the Crown (Belgium; 15 August 1946)

== Family ==
In 1935, Grasett married Joan Mary, who was the daughter of JK Foster of Egton Manor, Yorkshire.

== Sources ==
- 4237 Dr. Adrian Preston & Peter Dennis (Edited) "Swords and Covenants" Rowman And Littlefield, London. Croom Helm. 1976.
- H16511 Dr. Richard Arthur Preston "To Serve Canada: A History of the Royal Military College of Canada" 1997 Toronto, University of Toronto Press, 1969.
- H16511 Dr. Richard Arthur Preston "Canada's RMC – A History of Royal Military College" Second Edition 1982
- H1877 R. Guy C. Smith (editor) "As You Were! Ex-Cadets Remember". In 2 Volumes. Volume I: 1876–1918. Volume II: 1919–1984. Royal Military College. [Kingston]. The R.M.C. Club of Canada. 1984
- Smart, Nick (2005). Biographical Dictionary of British Generals of the Second World War. Barnesley: Pen & Sword. ISBN 1844150496.

Military offices
Preceded by Arthur Bartholomew	Commander of British Troops in China; 1938–1941	Succeeded by Christopher Maltby
Preceded by Roderic Petre	GOC 48th (South Midland) Infantry Division; October–November 1941	Succeeded by Hayman Hayman-Joyce
Preceded by Kenneth Anderson	GOC VIII Corps; 1941–1943	Succeeded by Herbert Lumsden
Government offices
Preceded by British Military Governor	Lieutenant Governor of Jersey; 1945–1953	Succeeded by Sir Gresham Nicholson
