= Edward Osborne Hewett =

Edward Osborne Hewett CMG
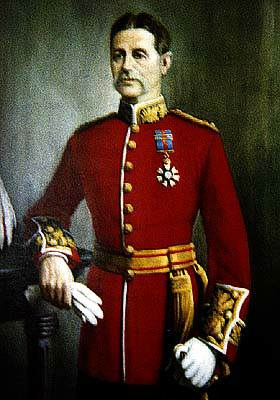
- Born: 25 September 1835; Llantrisant, Wales
- Died: 3 June 1897 (aged 61); Woolwich, Kent, England
- Education: Royal Military Academy, Woolwich
- Relatives: Sir Arthur Edward Grasett (grandson)
- Military career
- Allegiance: United Kingdom
- Branch: British Army
- Service years: 1854–1897
- Royal Engineers: General
- Conflicts: Trent Affair; American Civil War (observer); Battle of Antietam; Battle of Perryville; Fenian Raids
- Awards: Companion of the Order of St Michael and St George

Major-General Edward Osborne Hewett CMG (25 September 1835 – 3 June 1897) was a British Army officer and member of the Royal Engineers who was the first Commandant of the Royal Military College of Canada. He chose the Royal Military College's motto, "Truth, Duty, Valour".

== Early life and education ==
Hewett was born at Llantrisant in Wales to John Hewett, JP, DL, of Glamorgan, and Frances, daughter of Thomas Thornewell, DL, of Staffordshire.

His father was a militia colonel who had served with the Royal Navy and Royal Marines during the Napoleonic Wars and the War of 1812, where he was wounded in the Battle of Fort Oswego.

Edward was raised at Southsea, Hampshire, and educated at Cheltenham College and the Royal Military Academy, Woolwich.

== Career ==
Hewett was commissioned in the Royal Engineers in August 1854, and was preparing to sail for the Crimean War in late 1855 when the war ended. He served at fortifications in England until 1857 when he was posted to the West Indies. In 1860 he was appointed an instructor at the Royal Military Academy, but resigned his position in 1861 and was sent with a force to Canada in response to the Trent Affair. In Canada, Hewett was appointed commanding engineer for all forces west of Hamilton, and established headquarters in London.

In the autumn of 1862, he was given permission to take leave and observe the American Civil War. He visited the United States Military Academy at West Point, as well as the headquarters of the Army of the Potomac. Hewett was present on the field and observed the Battle of Antietam and the Battle of Perryville, where he was almost killed. He wrote highly of the courage and courtesy of the Americans, both north and south, and reinforced the beliefs of superiority of cavalry in battle.

Returning from the United States in 1863, he was posted to Nova Scotia and served in Halifax improving fortifications in the city during the Fenian Raids. In 1869 he was posted back to England, serving at Portsmouth until he was appointed to command the newly created Canadian military college in 1875.

Hewett was appointed the first Commandant of the Royal Military College of Canada, serving from 1875 to 1886. He was integral to the development of the military college and was highly lauded for his work. Due to his success, he was appointed a Companion of the Order of St Michael and St George (CMG) in the 1883 Birthday Honours.

In 1890 he was considered for the role of General Officer Commanding the Canadian Militia, but was instead appointed commandant of the Military Engineering School at Chatham. In 1895 Hewett was promoted to Lieutenant General and appointed Governor of the Royal Military Academy Woolwich.

== Personal life ==
Hewett married Catherine Mary Biscoe in Toronto in 1864. They had at least three sons and eight daughters. His daughter Catherine Frances married Arthur Wanton Grasett and was mother of Sir Arthur Edward Grasett; another daughter, Gwendolen Elizabeth, married William Garnett Braithwaite.

At age 61, Hewett died at Royal Military Academy Woolwich after breaking his leg playing tennis.

Academic offices
Preceded by New position	Commandant of the Royal Military College of Canada; 1875–1886	Succeeded by Major General John Ryder Oliver
