= Robert Bruce Burnside =

Australian barrister and judge

Justice of the Supreme Court of Western Australia
- In office 24 December 1902 – 8 August 1929
- Preceded by: Frederick Moorhead
- Succeeded by: John Dwyer

Personal details
- Born: 22 April 1862 Nassau, Bahamas
- Died: 8 August 1929 (aged 67) Claremont, Western Australia, Australia

Robert Bruce Burnside (22 April 1862 – 8 August 1929) was an Australian barrister and judge. He served on the Supreme Court of Western Australia from December 1902 until his death in August 1929.

== Early life and education ==
Burnside was born in Nassau, Bahamas, to Mary Elizabeth (née Francis) and Bruce Lockhart Burnside. His father was the colony's solicitor-general at the time, and later served as Chief Justice of Ceylon. His brother was Edmund Burnside.

After attending the Royal Naval School in London, Burnside studied law, training as a barrister. He entered Lincoln's Inn in 1881 and was called to the bar in 1884, leaving for Western Australia later that year.

== Career ==
Caricature by David Low

Burnside initially had his own firm in Perth, but later went into partnership with Douglas Gawler (a future member of parliament) in Fremantle. In January 1891, Burnside was appointed to the position of Usher of the Black Rod in the Legislative Council. He served until July 1894, when he was made crown solicitor (equivalent to solicitor-general).

In December 1902, Burnside was appointed to the vacant fourth position on the Supreme Court, as a puisne justice. He succeeded Frederick Moorhead, who had died after only seven months in office, and joined Edward Stone (the chief justice), Stephen Henry Parker, and Robert McMillan on the bench. Early in 1903, Burnside was made president of the State Court of Arbitration, a position which at the time was held only by justices of the Supreme Court. He served several terms in the position, totalling almost ten years, and was generally considered impartial.

Burnside also occasionally presided over criminal trials, and headed two royal commissions in the late 1910s.

== Personal life and death ==
Burnside died at his home in Claremont in August 1929, after a brief period of ill health. He had married Mary Charity Bruce in 1887, with whom he had one son, Dr. Bruce Burnside. Outside of his professional career, he had a keen interest in water sport, serving as president of the West Australian Rowing Club and commodore of the Royal Perth Yacht Club.
