= Edmund Burnside =

British colonial officer

Edmund Burnside (13 October 1873 – 20 January 1932) was a British colonial officer who served in Ceylon and the Federated Malay States, British Malaya.

== Early life ==
Burnside was born in the Bahamas in 1873, and was the third son of Bruce Lockhart Burnside, a barrister, and his wife Mary Elizabeth Francis. His father was the colony's solicitor-general at the time, and later served as Chief Justice of Ceylon. His brother was Robert Bruce Burnside.

== Career ==
Burnside began his career in Ceylon (now Sri Lanka) as Private Secretary to the Chief Justice of Ceylon, serving in the post from to 1883 to 1888.

He then left for British Malaya to join the civil service of the Federated Malay States in Perak, with his first appointment being assistant magistrate at Kinta. From 1888 to 1903, he held various positions in Perak including assistant Collector of Land Revenue, acting magistrate at Larut, assistant to the Secretary of the Government, acting District Treasurer, and acting District Magistrate at Matang.

In 1903, he moved to Selangor where his first appointment was as district officer in Ulu Langat. A year later he was in Kuala Lumpur as Collector of Land Revenue and Registrar of Titles, and Secretary to the Resident of Selangor. In 1911, he returned to Perak and was employed as Registrar of Titles and Superintendent of the Taiping prison, and in 1913, was appointed magistrate.

From 1913 to 1914 he was appointed acting Resident of Selangor before he returned to Perak occupying the positions of Registrar of Titles, and acting Commissioner of Trade and Customs. In 1919, he was appointed District Officer, Klang, before retiring in 1921.

== Personal life ==
In 1893, he married Sherwood Caton. He died in Jersey, aged 68, in 1932.
