= HMS Curacoa (D41) =

British C-class light cruiser

Coordinates: 55°50′N 8°38′W

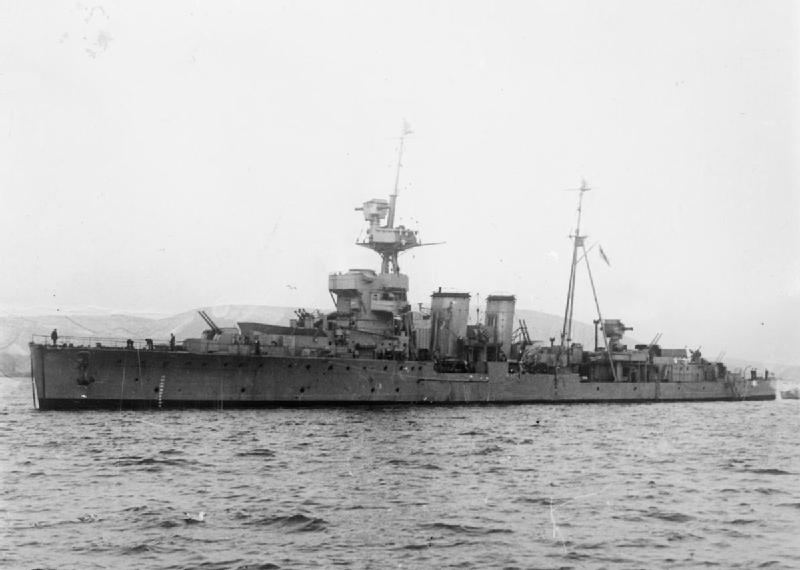
- Curacoa at anchor, 1941

History

United Kingdom
- Name: Curacoa
- Namesake: Curaçao
- Ordered: March–April 1916
- Builder: Pembroke Dockyard
- Laid down: 13 July 1916
- Launched: 5 May 1917
- Commissioned: 18 February 1918
- Reclassified: Converted to anti-aircraft cruiser, 1939–1940
- Identification: Pennant number: A7 (Jan 18); 62 (Apr 18); 41 (Nov 19); I.41 (1936); D.41 (1940)
- Nickname(s): Cocoa Boat
- Fate: Sunk in collision with RMS Queen Mary, 2 October 1942

General characteristics (as built)
- Class & type: C-class light cruiser
- Displacement: 4,190 long tons (4,260 t)
- Length: 450 ft 3 in (137.2 m) (o/a)
- Beam: 43 ft 5 in (13.2 m)
- Draught: 14 ft 8 in (4.5 m) (mean)
- Installed power: 6 × Yarrow boilers; 40,000 shp (30,000 kW)
- Propulsion: 2 × shafts; 2 × geared steam turbines
- Speed: 29 kn (54 km/h; 33 mph)
- Complement: 460
- Armament: 5 × single 6 in (152 mm) guns; 2 × single 3 in (76 mm) anti-aircraft guns; 4 × twin 21 in (533 mm) torpedo tubes
- Armour: Waterline belt: 1.25–3 in (32–76 mm); Deck: 1 in (25 mm)

General characteristics (where different)
- Type: Anti-aircraft cruiser
- Displacement: 5,403 long tons (5,490 t) (deep load)
- Armament: 4 × twin 4-inch (102 mm) dual-purpose guns; 2 × single, 1 × quadruple 2-pounder (40 mm) AA guns; 2 × quadruple Vickers 0.5 in (12.7 mm) AA machine guns

HMS Curacoa was a C-class light cruiser built for the Royal Navy during the First World War. She was one of the five ships of the Ceres sub-class and spent much of her career as a flagship. The ship was assigned to the Harwich Force during the war, but saw little action as she was completed less than a year before the war ended. Briefly assigned to the Atlantic Fleet in early 1919, Curacoa was deployed to the Baltic in May to support anti-Bolshevik forces during the British campaign in the Baltic during the Russian Civil War. Shortly thereafter the ship struck a naval mine and had to return home for repairs.

After spending the rest of 1919 and 1920 in reserve, she rejoined the Atlantic Fleet until 1928, aside from a temporary transfer to the Mediterranean Fleet in 1922–1923 to support British interests in Turkey during the Chanak Crisis. Curacoa was transferred to the Mediterranean Fleet in 1929.

In 1933, Curacoa became a training ship and in July 1939, two months before the start of the Second World War, she was converted into an anti-aircraft cruiser. She returned to service in January 1940 and, while providing escort in the Norwegian Campaign that April, was damaged by German aircraft. After repairs were completed that year, she escorted convoys in and around the British Isles for two years. In late 1942, during escort duty, she was accidentally sliced in half and sunk by the ocean liner RMS Queen Mary, with the loss of 337 men.

== Design and description ==
The C-class cruisers were intended to escort the fleet and defend it against enemy destroyers attempting to come within torpedo range. The Ceres sub-class was a slightly larger and improved version of the preceding Caledon sub-class. The ships were 450 feet 3 inches (137.2 m) long overall, with a beam of 43 feet 5 inches (13.2 m) and a mean draught of 14 feet 8 inches (4.5 m). Displacement was 4,190 long tons (4,260 t) at normal and 5,020 long tons (5,100 t) at deep load.

Curacoa was powered by two geared Parsons steam turbines, each driving one propeller shaft, which produced a total of 40,000 shaft horsepower (30,000 kW). The turbines used steam generated by six Yarrow boilers which gave her a speed of about 29 knots (54 km/h; 33 mph). During her sea trials on 14 February 1918, Curacoa reached her designed speed at 40,428 shp (30,147 kW). She carried 935 long tons (950 t) of fuel oil. The ship had a crew of about 460 officers and ratings.

The main armament of the Ceres-class ships consisted of five BL 6-inch (152 mm) Mk XII guns that were mounted on the centreline and designated '1' to '5' from front to rear. While identical in number to the Caledons, the layout was considerably improved in a number of ways. The gun formerly between the bridge and fore funnel was moved to a superfiring position over the forward gun with wider firing arc than in its old position. The others were also moved, one aft of the rear funnel, and the last two were in the stern, with one gun superfiring over the rearmost gun. The two QF 3-inch (76 mm) 20-cwt (Note: "Cwt" is the abbreviation for hundredweight; 20 cwt referring to the weight of the gun; one long ton or 2240 pounds.) anti-aircraft (AA) guns were positioned abreast the fore funnel. The torpedo armament of the Ceres class ships was identical to that of the Caledons, with eight 21 in (533 mm) torpedo tubes in four twin mounts, two on each broadside. The Ceres class was protected by a waterline belt 1.5–3 in (38–76 mm) thick and over the steering gear had a protective deck armour that was 1 in (25 mm) thick. Unlike her sister ships, her conning tower was removed before she was completed.

== Construction and career ==
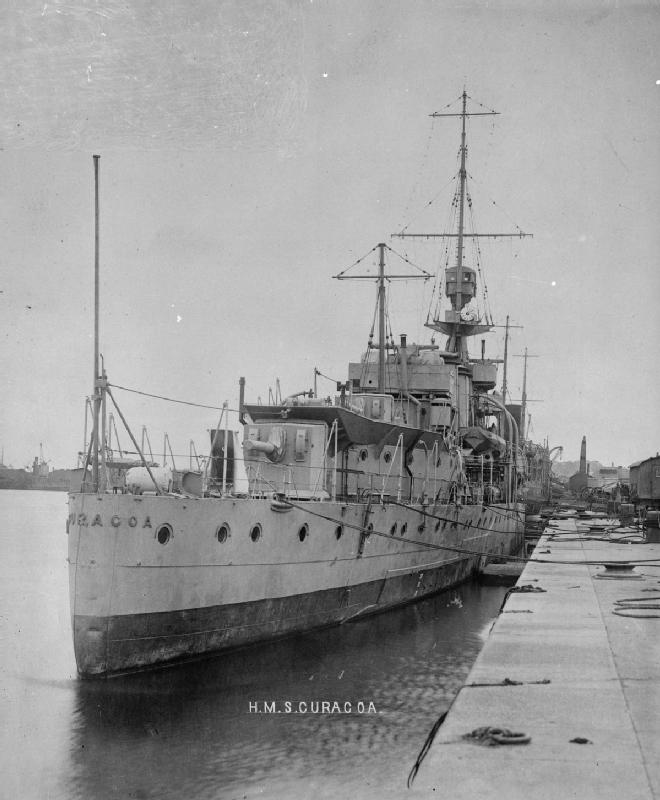
Stern view of Curacoa in 1918, showing the aft six-inch gun

Curacoa was ordered in March–April 1916 as part of the Repeat War Programme. She was the fourth ship of her name to serve in the Royal Navy and named to commemorate the capture of the Dutch island of Curaçao in 1807. (Note: "Curacoa" was the common spelling in English when the first ship was named in 1809; later ships retained that spelling name even though "Curacao" or "Curaçao" had become the accepted name for the island. Contemporary reports would occasionally use "Curacao" for the ship.) The ship was laid down at Pembroke Royal Dockyard on 13 July. She was launched on 5 May 1917 and completed on 18 February 1918. Her first commander was Captain Barry Domvile. On commissioning, Curacoa became flagship of the 5th Light Cruiser Squadron, part of the Harwich Force, serving there for the rest of the war. In association with John Cyril Porte's birthday and a medal ceremony at RNAS Felixstowe, her crew was inspected by King George V at Harwich on 26 February. From June onwards, she participated in reconnaissance sweeps ordered by Rear-Admiral Reginald Tyrwhitt, commander of the Harwich Force. Sometime in 1918, a pair of 2-pounder (40 mm) Mk II "pom-pom" light AA guns were installed.

In April 1919, Curacoa joined the 1st Light Cruiser Squadron of the newly established Atlantic Fleet. The following month, however, she was deployed to the Baltic as part of the British intervention in the Russian Civil War in support of the White Russians against the Bolsheviks. On 7 May, Rear-Admiral Walter Cowan transferred his flag to the ship from her half-sister Caledon. Ten days later, the ship was en route from Helsinki to Liepāja when she struck a mine with her stern, 70 miles (110 km) east of Reval (now Tallinn). One crewman was killed and three injured by the explosion. Cowan, who was taking a bath at the time, was dumped out of the bath, running to the bridge dressed only in an overcoat until clothing could be brought up from his "day cabin". Curacoa was able to reach a speed of 9 knots (17 km/h; 10 mph) after some repairs and reached Reval later that day. After temporary repairs there, she returned to the UK for permanent repairs at Sheerness Dockyard; her rudder fell off while passing The Skaw and the ship could only be steered with her engines for the last 500 miles (800 km) to the dockyard.

Curacoa was under repair through July and was placed in reserve after the repairs were completed. She remained in reserve through November 1920, but later served as the flagship of the 2nd Light Cruiser Squadron of the Atlantic Fleet through 1928. The ship was detached to the Mediterranean Fleet in September 1922 during the Chanak Crisis and arrived in Smyrna (now İzmir), Turkey, on 23 September. While there her crew assisted with the evacuation of refugees from the city after much of the city was destroyed by fire. Curacoa remained in the Mediterranean until at least February 1923. During the mid-1920s, her original 9-foot (2.7 m) rangefinders were exchanged for 12-foot (3.7 m) models.

On 4 September 1929, the ship was transferred to the Mediterranean Fleet as the flagship of the 3rd Cruiser Squadron, which was commanded by her first captain, Barry Domvile. She remained in the Mediterranean until 1932. She became a gunnery training ship on 18 December 1933 and continued in that role until 1939. In 1935, she was one of four Royal Navy ships featured in the British film Brown on Resolution, where she played a German battlecruiser. In July 1939, a few months before the outbreak of the Second World War in Europe, she began a conversion into an anti-aircraft cruiser at Chatham Dockyard. This consisted of replacing all of her six-inch guns with eight QF 4-inch (102 mm) Mk XVI dual-purpose guns in four twin-gun turrets, in the positions formerly occupied by Nos. 1, 3, 4, and 5 six-inch guns. A quadruple mount for the two-pounder Mk VII "pom-pom" light AA gun was installed in No. 2 gun's position. Quadruple Vickers 0.5 in (12.7 mm) AA machinegun mounts replaced the three-inch guns and her torpedo tubes were removed. Her masts were cut down and her existing fire-control systems were replaced by a pair of High-Angle Control System Mk III systems and a pom-pom director. A Type 279 early-warning radar was also installed. To counter the additional weight high in the ship, 200 long tons (203 t) of ballast was added. Although the weight of the ballast alone was more than that of the new equipment, it increased her metacentric height from 2.93 to 3.41 feet (0.9 to 1.0 m) at deep load.

=== Second World War ===
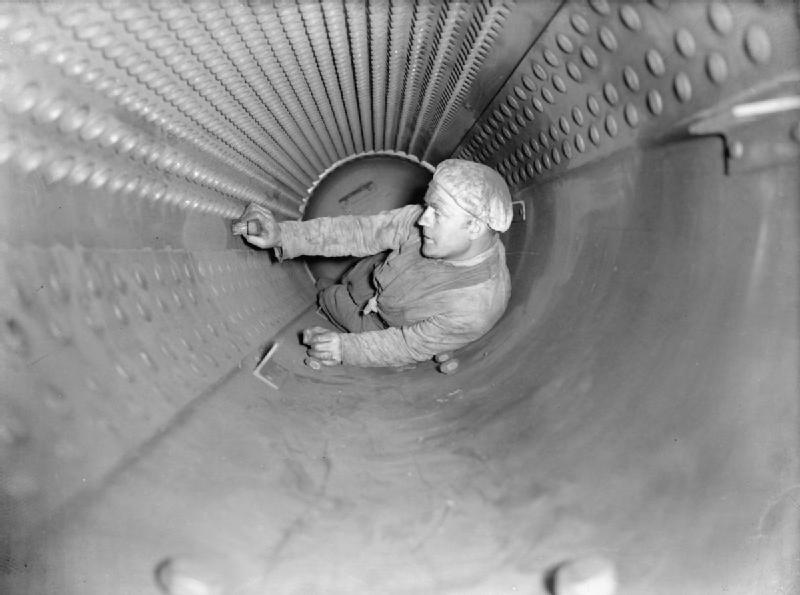
A stoker plugging a leaking boiler tube inside one of Curacoa's boilers at Rosyth, Scotland

The conversion was completed on 24 January 1940 and Curacoa was assigned to the Home Fleet. During the Norwegian Campaign, the ship escorted a British troop convoy to Åndalsnes (Operation Sickle) in mid-April. Together with the light cruiser Arethusa, Curacoa landed the battalion of the Sherwood Foresters at Molde; the quay at Åndalsnes had proved to be too small to allow more than one cruiser at a time to disembark their troops before daylight. Curacoa returned home, but was ordered back to Åndalsnes to protect the beachhead there from German aircraft, arriving on 22 April. Repeatedly attacked over the next few days, the ship was hit on the forecastle by a 250-kilogram (550 lb) bomb dropped by a bomber from the Third Group of Demonstration Wing 1 (III./Lehrgeschwader 1) on the evening of 24 April. The bomb killed eight crewmen, who were buried at Veblungsnes after the ship returned home for repairs. Several hours before she was hit, her captain reported that she was running low on four-inch ammunition.

After her repairs were completed, Curacoa was assigned to the Western Approaches where she escorted convoys in and around the British Isles for most of the next two years. By September 1941, Type 285 and Type 282 fire-control radars had been fitted. As part of the deception efforts for Convoy PQ 17, the ship formed part of a decoy convoy that sailed on 29 June 1942, but was not spotted by the Germans. By September 1942, her anti-aircraft suite had been reinforced by five single mounts for 20-millimetre (0.8 in) Oerlikon light AA guns; a Type 273 long-range surface-search radar was added.

==== Collision ====
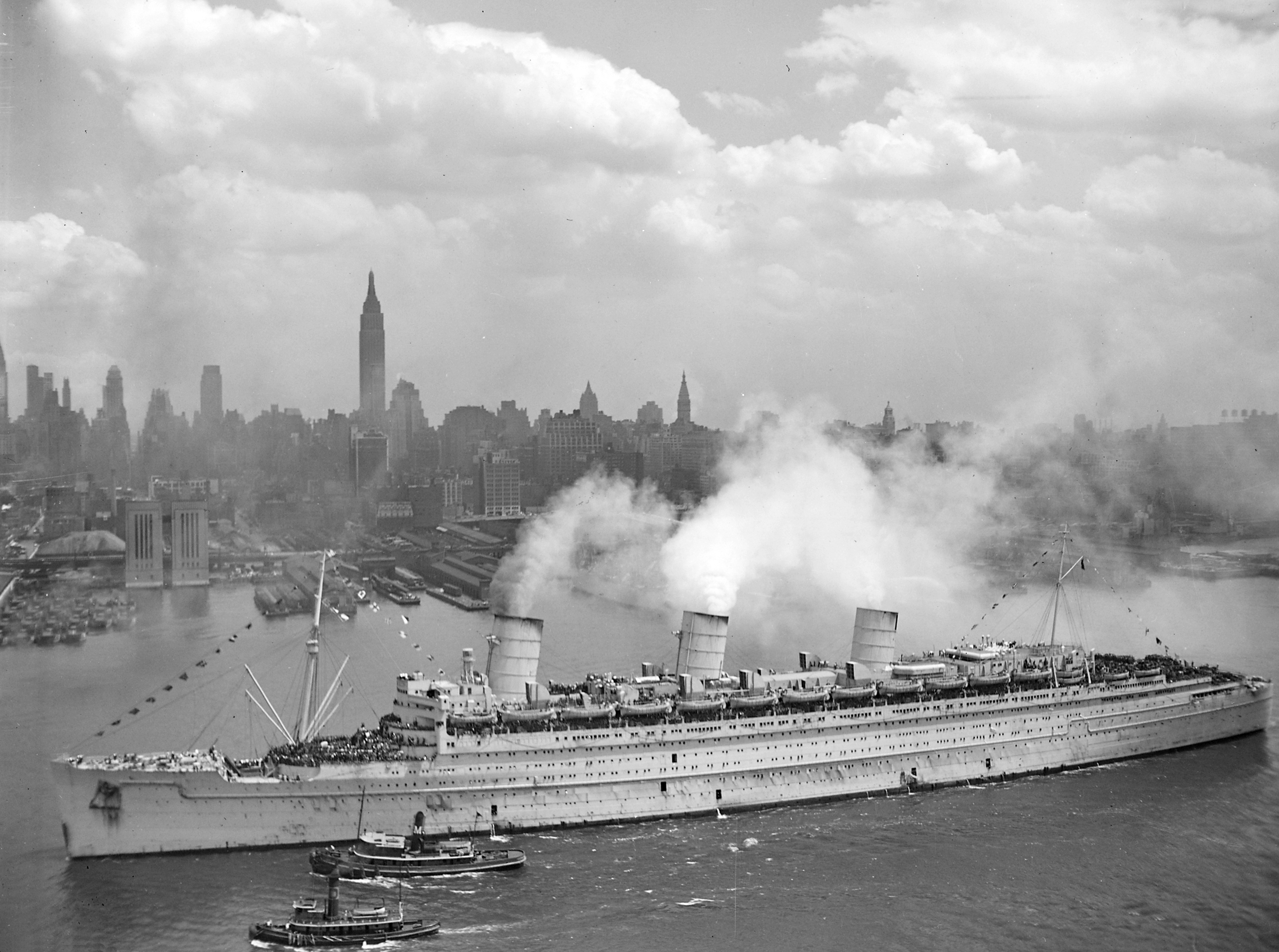
RMS Queen Mary, 20 June 1945, in New York Harbor carrying US troops from Europe

On the morning of 2 October 1942, Curacoa rendezvoused north of Ireland with the ocean liner Queen Mary, which was carrying approximately 10,000 American troops of the 29th Infantry Division. The liner was steaming an evasive "Zig-Zag Pattern No. 8" course at a speed of 28.5 knots (52.8 km/h; 32.8 mph), an overall rate of advance of 26.5 knots (49.1 km/h; 30.5 mph), to evade submarine attacks. The elderly cruiser remained on a straight course at a top speed of 25 knots (46 km/h; 29 mph) and would eventually be overtaken by the liner.

The two captains had different interpretations of The Rule of the Road; both believed their ship had the right of way. Captain John Wilfred Boutwood of Curacoa kept to the liner's mean course to maximize his ability to defend the liner from enemy aircraft, while Commodore Sir Cyril Gordon Illingworth of Queen Mary continued their zig-zag pattern expecting the escort cruiser to give way.

We could see our escort zig-zagging in front of us (Note: To the eye-witness, the cruiser's movements may have appeared differently relative to their own ship's movements.) - it was common for the ships and cruisers to zig-zag to confuse the U-boats. In this particular case however the escort was very, very close to us.

I said to my mate "You know she's zig-zigging all over the place in front of us, I'm sure we're going to hit her."

And sure enough, the Queen Mary sliced the cruiser in two like a piece of butter, straight through the six-inch [sic] armoured plating.

— Alfred Johnson, eye witness, BBC: "HMS Curacao Tragedy"

At 13:32, during the zig-zag, it became apparent that Queen Mary would come too close to the cruiser and the liner's officer of the watch interrupted the turn to avoid Curacoa. Upon hearing this command, Illingworth told his officer to: "Carry on with the zig-zag. These chaps are used to escorting; they will keep out of your way and won't interfere with you." At 14:04, Queen Mary started the starboard turn from a position slightly behind the cruiser and at a distance of two cables (about 400 yards (366 m)). Boutwood perceived the danger, but the distance was too close for either of the hard turns ordered for each ship to make any difference at the speeds that they were travelling. Queen Mary struck Curacoa amidships at full speed, cutting the cruiser in half. The aft end sank almost immediately, but the rest of the ship stayed on the surface a few minutes longer.

Acting under orders not to stop due to the risk of U-boat attacks, Queen Mary steamed onwards with a damaged bow. She radioed the other destroyers of her escort, about 7 nautical miles (13 km; 8.1 mi) away, and reported the collision. Hours later, the convoy's lead escort, consisting of Bramham and HMS Cowdray, returned to rescue approximately 101 survivors, including Boutwood. (Note: The number of survivors has ranged from 26 to 108 in sources published over the years.) Lost with Curacoa were 337 officers and men of her crew, according to the naval casualty file released by The United Kingdom National Archives in June 2013. (Note: The number of dead reported over the years has varied from "over 300" to 339.) Most of the lost men are commemorated on the Chatham Naval Memorial and the rest on the Portsmouth Naval Memorial. Those who died after rescue, or whose bodies were recovered, were buried in Chatham and in Ashaig Cemetery on the Isle of Skye. Under the Protection of Military Remains Act 1986, Curacoa's wrecksite is designated a "protected place".

Those who witnessed the collision were sworn to secrecy due to national security concerns. The loss was not publicly reported until after the war ended, although the Admiralty filed a writ against Queen Mary's owners, Cunard White Star Line, on 22 September 1943 in the Admiralty Court of the High Court of Justice. Little happened until 1945, when the case went to trial in June; it was adjourned to November and then to December 1946. Mr. Justice Pilcher exonerated Queen Mary's crew and her owners from blame on 21 January 1947 and laid all fault on Curacoa's officers. The Admiralty appealed his ruling and the Court of Appeal modified the ruling, assigning two-thirds of the blame to the Admiralty and one third to Cunard White Star. The latter appealed to the House of Lords, but the decision was upheld.

== Bibliography ==
- Admiralty Historical Section (2007). The Royal Navy and the Arctic Convoys. Naval Staff Histories. Whitehall History in association with Routledge. ISBN 978-0-7146-5284-9.
- Balkoski, Joseph (2005). Beyond the Beachhead: The 29th Infantry Division in Normandy (3rd ed.). Stackpole Books. ISBN 0-8117-3237-1.
- Bennett, Geoffrey (2002). Freeing the Baltic. Birlinn. ISBN 1-84341-001-X.
- Butler, Daniel Allen (2004). The Age of Cunard: A Transatlantic History 1839–2003. ProStar Publications. ISBN 978-1-57785-348-0.
- Colledge, J. J.; Warlow, Ben (2006) [1969]. Ships of the Royal Navy: The Complete Record of All Fighting Ships of the Royal Navy from the 15th Century to the Present (3rd Rev ed.). London: Chatham Publishing. ISBN 978-1-86176-281-8. OCLC 67375475.
- Dent, Stephen (2012). "Warship Note: HMS Curacoa – What's in a Name?". In Jordan, John (ed.). Warship 2012. London: Conway. pp. 172–74. ISBN 978-1-84486-156-9.
- Dent, Stephen (2014). "Warship Note: The Loss of HMS Curacoa". In Jordan, John (ed.). Warship 2014. London: Conway. pp. 181–83. ISBN 978-1-84486-236-8.
- Friedman, Norman (2010). British Cruisers: Two World Wars and After. Seaforth. ISBN 978-1-59114-078-8.
- Haarr, Geirr H. (2010). The Battle for Norway: April–June 1940. Seaforth Publishing. ISBN 978-1-84832-057-4.
- Halpern, Paul, ed. (2011). The Mediterranean Fleet 1920–1929. Navy Records Society Publications. Vol. 158. Ashgate. ISBN 978-1-4094-2756-8.
- Head, Michael (2009). "The Baltic Campaign, 1918–1920, Pt. I". Warship International. XLVI (2): 135–50. ISSN 0043-0374.
- Kelly, Peter (1997). "The Tragic Loss of HMS Curacoa". In McLean, David; Preston, Antony (eds.). Warship 1997–1998. London: Conway Maritime Press. pp. 160–166. ISBN 0-85177-722-8.
- Newbolt, Henry (1996) [1931]. Naval Operations. History of the Great War Based on Official Documents. Vol. V. Battery Press. ISBN 0-89839-255-1.
- Pearce, G. I. R. (2006). All My Yesterdays. Trafford Publishing. ISBN 978-1-4120-5511-6.
- Plowman, Peter (2003). Across the Sea to War: Australian and New Zealand Troop Convoys from 1865 through Two World Wars to Korea and Vietnam. Rosenberg Publishing. ISBN 1-8770-5806-8.
- Preston, Antony (1985). "Great Britain and Empire Forces". In Gray, Randal (ed.). Conway's All the World's Fighting Ships 1906–1921. Naval Institute Press. pp. 1–104. ISBN 0-85177-245-5.
- Raven, Alan & Roberts, John (1980). British Cruisers of World War Two. Naval Institute Press. ISBN 0-87021-922-7.
- Speight, James G. (2015). Fork-Tail Devil. AuthorHouse. ISBN 978-1-4969-6423-6.
- Thomas, David & Holmes, Patrick (1997). Queen Mary and the Cruiser: The Curacoa Disaster. Leo Cooper. ISBN 0-85052-548-9.
- Watton, Ross (1989). The Cunard Liner Queen Mary. Anatomy of the Ship. Naval Institute Press. ISBN 0-87021-599-X.
- Whitley, M. J. (1999). Cruisers of World War Two: An International Encyclopedia. Brockhampton Press. ISBN 1-86019-874-0.
