= James Robert Longden =

English colonial administrator (1827-1891)

Sir James Robert Longden GCMG
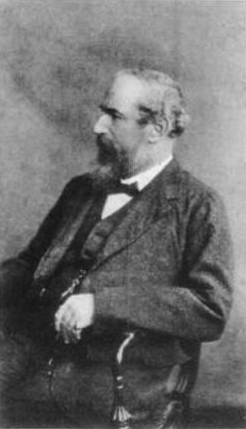

15th Governor of British Ceylon
- In office 4 September 1877 – 10 July 1883
- Monarch: Queen Victoria
- Preceded by: William Henry Gregory
- Succeeded by: John Douglas (Acting governor)

Personal details
- Born: 7 July 1827 Fitzroy Square, London
- Died: 4 October 1891 (aged 64) Longhope, Watford
- Resting place: Brookwood Cemetery; 51°18′01″N 0°37′32″W

Sir James Robert Longden GCMG (7 July 1827 – 4 October 1891) was an English colonial administrator.

Longden was born as the youngest son of John R. Longden, proctor, of Doctors' Commons, London. In 1844, two years after the establishment of a civil government, he was appointed government clerk in the Falkland Islands, and became acting colonial secretary the year after. In 1861 he was appointed President of the Virgin Islands, in 1865 Governor of Dominica, in 1867 Governor of British Honduras, in 1870 Governor of Trinidad, Governor of British Guiana in 1874, and in December 1876 Governor of Ceylon, which post he held until his retirement in 1883. Most notable of his tenure in Ceylon was his grant of land that established the Borella General Cemetery, that has since interred the names of many great Ceylonese over the centuries. He was made CMG in 1871, KCMG in 1876, GCMG in the 1883 Birthday Honours.

After his retirement he resided at Longhope, near Watford, Hertfordshire, and took a very active part in county affairs. He was a J.P. and alderman for the county under the Local Government Act. He died at Longhope on 4 October 1891. His funeral took place at Brookwood Cemetery on 9 October 1891.

== Family ==
On 22 September 1864 on the island of Saint Kitts, he married Alice Emily Berridge (1846–1910), younger daughter of James Samuel Berridge (1806–1885), a local landowner and businessman, and his wife Jane Chapman (1803–1888). They had six children, including:

- Colonel Arthur Berridge Longden DSO (1868–1936)
- Cyril Chapman Longden KPM (1873–1913)
- Vice-Admiral Horace Walker Longden CMG (1877–1953)
- Alice Emily Longden, who married in 1900 W. Engelenburg of Soerabaia, Java.

Government offices
Preceded by William Henry Gregory	Governor of Ceylon; 1877–1883	Succeeded by John Douglas acting governor
Preceded by Sir John Scott	Governor of British Guiana; 1874–1877	Succeeded by Cornelius Hendricksen Kortright
Preceded by Arthur Charles Hamilton-Gordon	Governor of Trinidad; 1870–1874	Succeeded by William Wellington Cairns
Preceded by John Gardiner Austin	Lieutenant Governor of British Honduras; 1867–1870	Succeeded by William Wellington Cairns
Preceded by Thomas Price	Lieutenant Governor of Dominica; 1865-1867	Succeeded by Henry Ernest Gascoyne Bulwer (acting)
Preceded by Thomas Price	President of the Virgin Islands; 1861–1864	Succeeded by Arthur Carlos Henry Rumbold
