= Gordon Thorne =

English cricketer and British Army officer

Lieutenant-Colonel Gordon Thorne DSO
- Born: 3 March 1897; Chelsea, London, England
- Died: 2 March 1942 (aged 44); SS Rooseboom, Indian Ocean
- Military career
- Allegiance: United Kingdom; British Ceylon
- Branch: British Army; Ceylon Defence Force
- Service years: 1916–1942
- Rank: Lieutenant-Colonel
- Unit: Royal Norfolk Regiment
- Commands: Commander (Ceylon Defence Force)
- Conflicts: First World War; Second World War: Pacific War; Malayan campaign; Battle of Singapore; Sinking of the SS Rooseboom †
- Awards: Distinguished Service Order

Gordon Calthrop Thorne DSO (3 March 1897 – 2 March 1942) was an English first-class cricketer and British Army officer. Serving for most of his military career with the Royal Norfolk Regiment, Thorne saw action in the First World War from 1916 to 1918, before serving in British India and British Ceylon, where he served as the 9th Commander of the Ceylon Defence Force from 13 May 1937 until 5 February 1939. He served in the Second World War with the Cambridgeshire Regiment, seeing action during the Japanese invasion of Malaya, for which he was awarded the Distinguished Service Order, and in the Battle of Singapore. He escaped capture by the Japanese at Singapore aboard a Dutch steamship, but was killed in March 1942 when it was torpedoed by a Japanese submarine in the Indian Ocean. During his military career, he also played first-class cricket for the British Army cricket team.

== Life and military career ==
Thorne was born at Chelsea to Frederick Gordon Thorne and his wife, Mabel. He was educated at Haileybury, where he played for both the cricket XI and the rugby XV. While studying at Haileybury, he debuted in minor counties cricket for Norfolk in the 1914 Minor Counties Championship. From Haileybury, he enlisted in the Royal Norfolk Regiment as a second lieutenant in April 1916 and served in the First World War. He saw action on the Western Front, where he was seriously wounded and returned home to England to recover. He returned to the Western Front in 1918 and was mentioned in dispatches twice. Following the war, he played five further minor counties matches for Norfolk in 1924–25, and was promoted to the rank of lieutenant prior to April 1926, when he was serving as an adjutant while holding the rank of lieutenant. He made his only appearance in first-class cricket in 1927, appearing for the British Army cricket team against Oxford University at Oxford. Batting twice in the match, he was dismissed in the Army's first-innings for 17 by Bertie de Silva, while in their second-innings he was dismissed for 7 runs by Errol Holmes.

== Service in British India and Ceylon ==
He was posted to British India with the Royal Norfolk Regiment, where he served in the North-West Frontier Province. Prior to 1935, he had been promoted to the rank of captain, with promotion to the rank of major in May 1935. When serving with the Royal Norfolk Regiment in British Ceylon, he was appointed to be a staff officer in the Ceylon Defence Force in August 1936. in August of the following year, he was appointed as the Commander of the Ceylon Defence Force, upon which he was granted the temporary rank of lieutenant colonel. He served as Commander of the Ceylon Defence Force until 1939, after which he was succeeded by fellow services first-class cricketer Reginald White. Following this he became the commanding officer of the 2nd Battalion, Cambridgeshire Regiment and was promoted to the full rank of lieutenant colonel.

== World War II and death ==
During the Second World War, the battalion was sent to Singapore to reinforce the 15th Indian Infantry Brigade at Batu Pahat against Japanese attacks. The brigade held the town for ten days and Thorne was awarded the Distinguished Service Order for his determination and leadership in holding back the Japanese advances. Eventually forced out of the town, some 500 members of the battalion fought their way back to Singapore, where they came under intense attack along the Braddell Road. Running low on ammunition and other supplies, Thorne along with several thousand other personnel managed to escape Singapore aboard a ship, eventually finding passage aboard the Dutch steamship SS Rooseboom. Setting sail across the Indian Ocean for Ceylon, the ship was spotted by the Japanese submarine I-59 on 2 March 1942 and was torpedoed, causing the ship to capsize and quickly sink. It is assumed Thorne went down with the ship, as his body was never recovered. He is commemorated at the Kranji War Memorial in Singapore.

He was survived by his wife, Pamela, and their son, Frederick. They later emigrated to the United States. His nephew, David Thorne, was also a first-class cricketer and a general in the British Army.

Military offices
Preceded by Robert Burton Lesley	Commander of the Ceylon Defence Force; 1937–1939	Succeeded by Reginald Strelley Moresby White
