= Commander of the Ceylon Defence Force =

Commander of the Ceylon Defence Force was the title of the head of the Ceylon Defence Force. The post was created in 1888, replacing the position of General Officer Commanding, Ceylon, and existed until 1949.

== List of Commanders ==
No.	Portrait	Rank	Name	Appointment	Left office	Unit	Decorations
Ceylon Volunteers (1888-1896)
1		Lieutenant colonel	Francis Coningsby Hannam Clarke	20 April 1888	27 August 1893	Royal Artillery	CMG, psc, FRGS, FRCI, CLIV
2		Lieutenant colonel	Henry Byrde	28 August 1893	13 May 1896	57th Regiment of Foot	CLIV
Ceylon Volunteers Force (1896-1913)
3		Colonel	A. F. C. Vincent	13 May 1896	1902	Scottish Rifles	CMG
		Major	H. G. Morris	1902	1902	Duke of Cornwall's Light Infantry	
3		Colonel	A. F. C. Vincent	1902	14 March 1913	Scottish Rifles	CMG
		Lieutenant colonel	Gorden Fraser	14 March 1913	13 May 1913		VD, CLI
3		Colonel	A. F. C. Vincent	13 May 1913	31 May 1913	Scottish Rifles	CMG
Ceylon Defence Force (1913-1946)
4		Brigadier general	R. B. Fell	1 June 1913	6 March 1914	Scottish Rifles	CB
		Lieutenant colonel	W. G. B. Dickson	6 March 1914	?		CMR
		Honorary Lieutenant colonel	Edward James Hayward	7 October 1914	?		CBE, VD, CAV
4		Brigadier general	R. B. Fell	?	31 December 1919	Scottish Rifles	CB
		Lieutenant colonel	Thomas Howard Chapman	1 January 1920	21 July 1920		OBE, VD
5		Brigadier general	F. M. G. Rowley	22 July 1920	8 February 1927		CB, CMG, DSO
6		Colonel	Albion Earnest Andrews	9 February 1927	14 December 1928	Hampshire Regiment	OBE
		Lieutenant colonel	G. B. Stevens	14 December 1928	28 April 1929	Ceylon Planters Rifle Corps	VD
7		Colonel	Edward Bromfield Ferrers	29 April 1929	3 March 1935	Black Watch	DSO
8		Colonel	Robert Burton Leslie	3 March 1935	12 May 1937	Royal Lincolnshire Regiment	MC
9		Colonel	Gordon Calthrop Thorne	13 May 1937	5 February 1939	Royal Norfolk Regiment	
10		Colonel	Reginald Strelley Moresby White	6 February 1939	1 January 1942	Leicestershire Regiment	OBE
11		Colonel	T. G. Watson	1 January 1942	1945	8th King's Royal Irish Hussars	
12		Colonel	R. A. McGeorge	1945	1946	The Rifle Brigade	
Ceylon Defence Force & Ceylon Volunteers Force (1946-1949)
		Colonel	Randolph Jewell Francis Mendis	6 April 1946	7 August 1949		OBE, ED, BA
