= Japanese submarine I-159 =

Japanese Navy cruiser

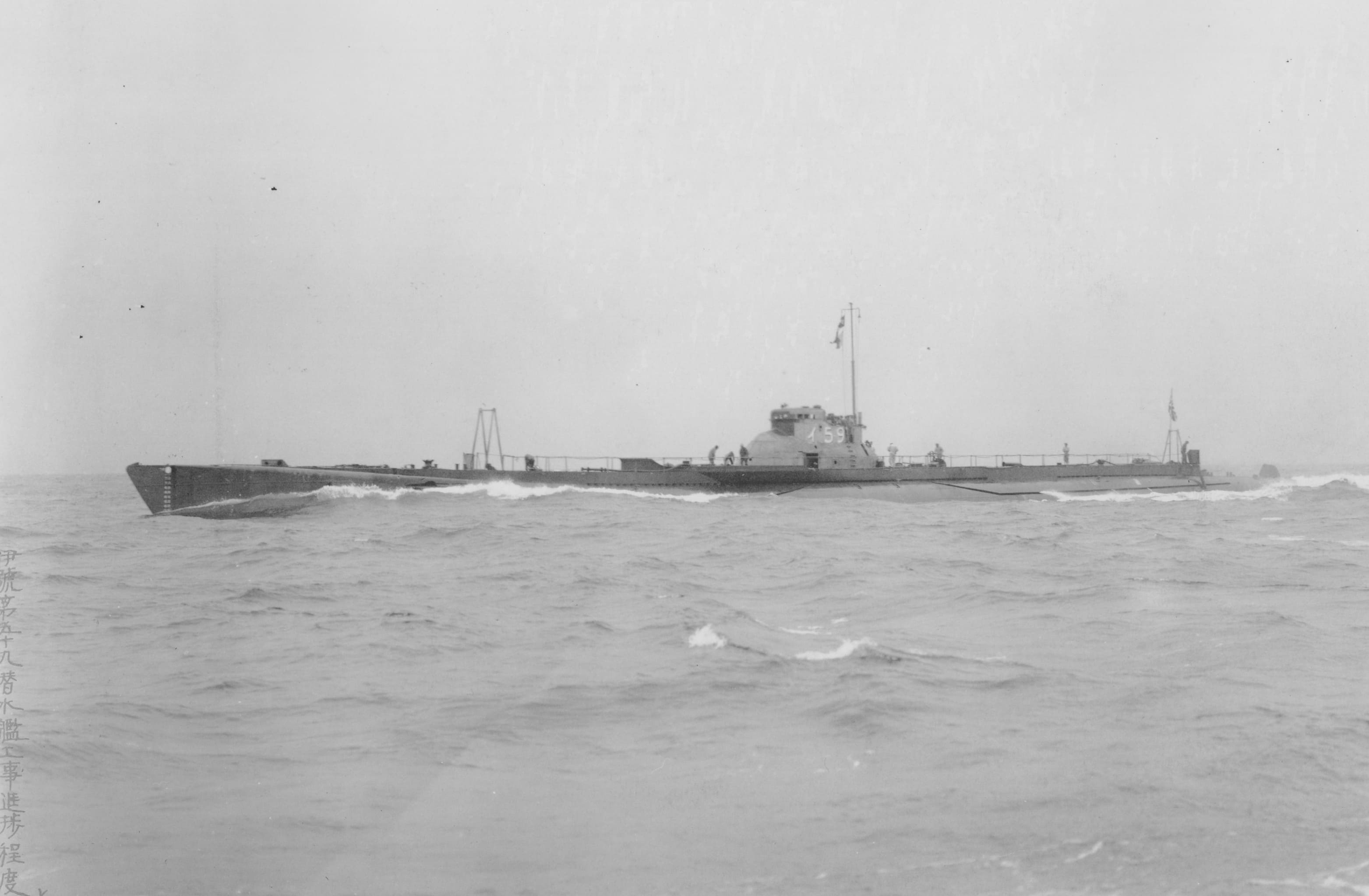
- I-159 during sea trials on 25 November 1929

History

Empire of Japan
- Name: I-59
- Builder: Yokosuka Naval Arsenal, Yokosuka, Japan
- Laid down: 25 March 1927
- Launched: 25 March 1929
- Completed: 31 March 1930
- Commissioned: 31 March 1930
- Decommissioned: 15 November 1933
- Recommissioned: 1934
- Decommissioned: by November 1936
- Recommissioned: early 1937
- Renamed: I-159 on 20 May 1942
- Stricken: 30 November 1945
- Fate: Scuttled 1 April 1946
- Notes: training submarine July 1942–April 1945

General characteristics
- Class & type: Kaidai-class submarine (KD3B Type)
- Displacement: 1,829 tonnes (1,800 long tons) surfaced; 2,337 tonnes (2,300 long tons) submerged
- Length: 101 m (331 ft 4 in)
- Beam: 8 m (26 ft 3 in)
- Draft: 4.9 m (16 ft 1 in)
- Installed power: 6,800 bhp (5,100 kW) (diesels); 1,800 hp (1,300 kW) (electric motors)
- Propulsion: Diesel-electric; 2 × diesel engines; 2 × electric motors
- Speed: 20 knots (37 km/h; 23 mph) surfaced; 8 knots (15 km/h; 9.2 mph) submerged
- Range: 10,000 nmi (19,000 km; 12,000 mi) at 10 knots (19 km/h; 12 mph) surfaced; 90 nmi (170 km; 100 mi) at 3 knots (5.6 km/h; 3.5 mph) submerged
- Test depth: 60 m (197 ft)
- Complement: 60
- Armament: 8 × 533 mm (21 in) torpedo tubes (6 bow, 2 stern); 1 × 120 mm (4.7 in) deck gun

I-159, originally I-59, was an Imperial Japanese Navy Kaidai-class cruiser submarine of the KD3B sub-class in commission from 1930 to 1945. During World War II, she made two war patrols in the Indian Ocean, took part in the Battle of Midway, and served as a training submarine before ending the war as a kaiten suicide attack torpedo carrier. She surrendered at the end of the war and was scuttled in 1946.

== Design and description ==
The submarines of the KD3B sub-class were essentially repeats of the preceding KD3A sub-class with minor modifications to improve seakeeping. They displaced 1,829 metric tons (1,800 long tons) surfaced and 2,337 metric tons (2,300 long tons) submerged. The submarines were 101 meters (331 ft 4 in) long, had a beam of 8 meters (26 ft 3 in) and a draft of 4.9 meters (16 ft 1 in). The boats had a diving depth of 60 m (197 ft)

For surface running, the submarines were powered by two 3,400-brake-horsepower (2,535 kW) diesel engines, each driving one propeller shaft. When submerged each propeller was driven by a 900-horsepower (671 kW) electric motor. They could reach 20 knots (37 km/h; 23 mph) on the surface and 8 knots (15 km/h; 9.2 mph) underwater. On the surface, the KD3Bs had a range of 10,000 nautical miles (19,000 km; 12,000 mi) at 10 knots (19 km/h; 12 mph); submerged, they had a range of 90 nmi (170 km; 100 mi) at 3 knots (5.6 km/h; 3.5 mph).

The submarines were armed with eight internal 53.3 cm (21.0 in) torpedo tubes, six in the bow and two in the stern. They carried one reload for each tube, a total of 16 torpedoes. They were also armed with one 120 mm (4.7 in) deck gun.

== Construction and commissioning ==
The submarine was laid down on 25 March 1927 at the Yokosuka Naval Arsenal in Yokosuka, Japan. Both launched and numbered I-59 on 25 March 1929, she was completed and commissioned on 31 March 1930.

== Service history ==
=== Pre-World War II ===
On the day of her completion and commissioning, I-59 was attached to the Kure Naval District and assigned to Submarine Division 28. On 1 December 1930, the division was assigned to Submarine Squadron 2 in the 2nd Fleet, a component of the Combined Fleet. The division was reassigned to Submarine Squadron 1 in the 1st Fleet, also a component of the Combined Fleet, on 1 December 1932. The division was transferred to the Sasebo Defense Division in the Sasebo Naval District on 15 November 1933, and I-59 was decommissioned and placed in reserve that day. While she was in reserve, her division was reassigned on 11 December 1933 to the Sasebo Guard Division in the Sasebo Naval District.

During 1934, I-59 returned to active service, and on 15 November 1934 her division began another stint in Submarine Squadron 2 in the 2nd Fleet. On 7 February 1935 I-59 got underway from Sasebo along with the other eight submarines of Submarine Squadron 2 — I-53, I-54, I-55, I-60, I-61, I-62, I-63, and I-64 — for a training cruise in the Kuril Islands. The cruise concluded with their arrival at Sukumo Bay on 25 February 1935. The nine submarines departed Sasebo on 29 March 1935 to train in Chinese waters, returning to Sasebo on 4 April 1935. On 15 November 1935, Submarine Division 28 was reassigned for a second tour of duty in Submarine Squadron 1 in the 1st Fleet. I-59 apparently had been decommissioned again by November 1936.

Recommissioned by early 1937, I-59 put to sea from Sasebo with I-60 and I-63 on 27 March 1937 for a training cruise in the vicinity of Qingdao, China. They concluded it with their arrival at Ariake Bay on 6 April 1937. Submarine Division 28 was reassigned to the Sasebo Defense Squadron in the Sasebo Naval District on 1 December 1937, but returned to duty with Submarine Squadron 1 in the 1st Fleet on 15 December 1938. From 6 to 29 January 1941, I-60 temporarily relieved I-59 as the flagship of Submarine Division 28. Again relieved of flagship duty later in 1941, I-59 resumed her role as division flagship on 3 December 1941.

=== World War II ===
==== December 1941–January 1942 ====
I-59 was undergoing overhaul at Kobe, Japan, when the war in the Pacific began with the Japanese attack on Pearl Harbor, Hawaii, on 7 December 1941 (8 December on the other side of the International Date Line in Japan). She got underway from Kobe on 31 December 1941 in company with I-60, bound for Davao City on Mindanao in the Philippines. The two submarines arrived at Davao on 5 January 1942 and refueled there. While at Davao, I-60 relieved I-59 as flagship of Submarine Division 28 on 9 January 1942.

==== First war patrol ====
On 10 January 1942, I-59 departed Davao City in company with I-60 to begin her first war patrol. The two submarines proceeded to the Banda Sea south of the Sunda Islands, off the Celebes in the Netherlands East Indies, and along with the other submarines of Submarine Squadron 5 — I-62, I-64, I-65, and I-66 — covered the Japanese landings at Kema and Manado in northern Celebes, which began on 11 January. On 13 January, I-59 parted company with I-60 and proceeded to a patrol area in the Indian Ocean off Christmas Island.

I-59 sank the Norwegian 4,184-gross register ton cargo steamer Eidsvold off Flying Fish Cove on Christmas Island on 20 January 1942, hitting Eidsvold with the sixth torpedo she fired. On 25 January, she conducted a periscope reconnaissance of Sabang on the coast of Sumatra to ascertain whether any Allied warships were there. Finding none, she torpedoed and sank an unidentified British merchant ship and took some of its crew prisoner. She concluded her patrol with her arrival at Penang in Japanese-occupied British Malaya on 26 January 1942.

==== Second war patrol ====
I-59 got underway from Penang on 21 February 1942 for her second war patrol, assigned a patrol area in the Indian Ocean southwest of Sumatra. At 23:35 on 1 March 1942, she was west of Sumatra when she torpedoed the Dutch 1,035-gross register ton passenger ship SS Rooseboom, bound from Padang, Sumatra, to Colombo, Ceylon, carrying about 500 people — mostly British military personnel and a large number of civilians — fleeing British Malaya and the Netherlands East Indies as the Japanese advanced. Rooseboom capsized and sank quickly at 00°15′N 086°50′E, leaving about 135 survivors behind, 80 of them aboard a lifeboat designed to hold 28 and the rest clinging to debris in the water. The Dutch steamer SS Palopo rescued two people from the water nine days later, and only four of those aboard the lifeboat survived to reach Sipora off Sumatra 30 days after Rooseboom put to sea. Among those lost were British Army Brigadier Archibald Paris, Lieutenant Colonel Gordon Thorne, and Sergeant Percy Saunders, the latter two notable athletes of the era. I-59 returned to Penang on 12 March 1942.

==== March–May 1942 ====
On 22 March 1942, I-59 departed Penang bound for Sasebo, which she reached on 1 April 1942. While she was in Japan, Submarine Division 28 was disbanded and she was assigned to Submarine Division 19 on 10 April 1942. She left Japan on 19 May 1942, departing Kure and setting course for Kwajalein Atoll. During her voyage, she was renumbered I-159 on 20 May 1942. She arrived at Kwajalein on 26 May 1942.

==== Third war patrol: The Battle of Midway ====
Assigned along with the submarines I-156, I-157, I-158, I-162, I-165, and I-166 to Submarine Squadron 5 in the 6th Fleet′s Advance Expeditionary Force to support Operation MI, the planned Japanese invasion of Midway Atoll in the Northwestern Hawaiian Islands, I-159 got underway from Kwajalein on 30 May 1942 for her third war patrol. Submarine Squadron 5 deployed in the Pacific Ocean between 28°20′N 162°20′W and 26°00′N 165°00′W. The Japanese suffered a decisive defeat on 4 June 1942 during the Battle of Midway, and that day the commander-in-chief of the 6th Fleet, Vice Admiral Teruhisa Komatsu, ordered the 15 submarines in the Japanese submarine patrol line to move westward.

After the commander-in-chief of the Combined Fleet, Admiral Isoroku Yamamoto, ordered Komatsu to interpose his submarines between the retreating Japanese fleet and the opposing United States Navy aircraft carriers, the Japanese submarines, including I-159, began a gradual movement to the north-northwest, moving at 3 knots (5.6 km/h; 3.5 mph) by day and 14 knots (26 km/h; 16 mph) after dark. I-159 made no contact with enemy forces during the battle and returned to Kwajalein on 21 June 1942.

==== Training duties ====
I-159 departed Kwajalein on 22 June 1942 and proceeded to Kure, Japan, which she reached on 1 July 1942. On 10 July 1942, Submarine Squadron 5 was disbanded, and Submarine Division 19 — consisting of I-156, I-157, I-158, and I-159 — was reassigned to the Kure Guard Force in the Kure Naval District, and I-159 assumed duty as a training submarine. On 18 July 1943, I-158 relieved I-159 as flagship of Submarine Division 19, and on 1 December 1943 the division was reassigned to the Kure Submarine Squadron in the Kure Naval District.

On 25 December 1943 and again on 26 December 1943, I-159 called at Tokuyama, Japan, to refuel at the Tokuyama Fuel Depot, in each case departing the same day. On 5 January 1944, she took part in the first stage of submarine camouflage pattern experiments in the Iyo Nada in the Seto Inland Sea conducted by the Naval Submarine School, with the "No. 5" camouflage scheme — probably a greenish-gray pattern — painted on her hull and the sides of her conning tower. Later in January 1944, she tested the Type 2 magnetic influence exploder for Type 95 torpedoes. From 23 to 25 February 1944, she participated in the second stage of the camouflage pattern experiments, this time with the No. 5 pattern also applied to her wooden deck.

==== Kaiten carrier ====
Submarine Division 19 was abolished on 20 April 1945 and I-159′s training duties came to an end that day as she was assigned to Submarine Division 34 in the 6th Fleet. In May 1945 she underwent conversion at the Kure Naval Arsenal to carry two kaiten piloted suicide attack torpedoes, and she subsequently transported kaiten to future kaiten bases on Shikoku and Kyushu. In July 1945, the crews of I-156, I-157, I-158, I-159, and I-162 underwent training to launch kaiten during an anticipated Allied invasion of Japan.

Due to the danger of Allied air attacks on Kure, I-159 moved to Maizuru on Honshu′s east coast in August 1945. On 6 August, she was assigned along with the submarines I-36, I-155, and I-156 to the Shinshu-tai ("Land of Gods Unit") kaiten group, scheduled to depart Japan in mid-August 1945 to conduct attacks on Allied ships.

I-159 was still in port at Maizuru on 11 August 1945 when Iwo Jima-based United States Army Air Forces P-51 Mustang fighter aircraft strafed her, puncturing her main ballast tanks in three places. She transferred to the kaiten base at Hirao at the southern end of Honshu after makeshift repairs. On 15 August 1945, she was reassigned to Submarine Division 15 in the 6th Fleet along with I-36, I-47, I-157, and other submarines.

Later on 15 August 1945, I-159 was at Hirao when Emperor Hirohito announced in a radio broadcast that hostilities between Japan and the Allies had ceased. Misunderstanding him, the submarine crews continued to prepare for their Shinshu-tai sortie, and I-159 embarked two kaiten and their pilots. At 12:00 on 16 August, she departed Hirao — the only submarine to get underway for the Shinshu-tai sortie — with orders to attack Soviet shipping in the Vladivostok area and any Allied ships attempting to interfere with her. She passed through the Seto Inland Sea and the Bungo Strait and proceeded submerged toward Ōsumi Strait.

==== End of war ====
On 17 August 1945, I-159 was off Miyazaki Prefecture on Kyushu when she received word from Hirao that hostilities had ended. She made port at Aburatsu, Kyushu, that day and destroyed all of her secret documents there. On 18 August, she got back underway and proceeded to Hirao. She surrendered to Allied forces in September 1945.

== Disposal ==
I-159 moved to Sasebo in October 1945 and was stripped of all useful equipment, and the Japanese struck her from the Navy list on 30 November 1945. She was among a number of Japanese submarines scuttled by the United States Navy off the Goto Islands in Operation Road's End on 1 April 1946, the U.S. Navy submarine tender USS Nereus (AS-17) towing her to her scuttling site and sinking her with gunfire.
