= George Bridges Stevens =

Colonel George Bridges Stevens CBE VD
- Military career
- Allegiance: British Ceylon
- Branch: Ceylon Defence Force
- Rank: Colonel
- Unit: Ceylon Planters Rifle Corps
- Commands: Commander of the Ceylon Defence Force

Colonel George Bridges Stevens was an acting Commander of the Ceylon Defence Force. He was appointed on 14 December 1928 until 28 April 1929. He was succeeded by Edward Bromfield Ferrers.

Military offices
Preceded by Albion Earnest Andrews	Commander of the Ceylon Defence Force; 1928-1929	Succeeded by Edward Bromfield Ferrers
