= A. C. F. Vincent =

British Army officer

Colonel A. C. F. Vincent CMG
- Born: Arthur Craigie Fitz-Hardinge Vincent; 13 January 1857; Mussoorie, Bengal
- Died: 22 June 1929 (aged 72); Hendon, Middlesex, England
- Military career
- Allegiance: British Ceylon
- Branch: Ceylon Defence Force
- Rank: Colonel
- Unit: Scottish Rifles
- Commands: Commander of the Ceylon Volunteers Force

Colonel Arthur Craigie Fitz-Hardinge Vincent CMG (31 January 1857 – 22 June 1929) was a British Army officer who was the 3rd Commander of the Ceylon Volunteers Force. He was appointed on 13 May 1896 and held the post till 1902 and again from 1902 to 14 March 1913 and 13 May 1913 to 31 May 1913. Two others, H. G. Morris and Gorden Fraser, acted in between his tenure. He was succeeded by R. B. Fell, as Commander of the Ceylon Defence Force.

Vincent was the son of Lt.-Gen. William Vincent of the Bengal Army and Phoebe Letitia Cecilia Berkeley, eldest daughter of Henry FitzHardinge Berkeley, M.P. and granddaughter of Frederick Berkeley, 5th Earl of Berkeley.

He was appointed a Companion of the Order of St Michael and St George in the 1902 Birthday Honours.

Military offices
Preceded by Henry Byrde	Commander of the Ceylon Volunteers Force; 1896-1902	Succeeded by H. G. Morris acting Commander
Preceded by H. G. Morris acting Commander	Commander of the Ceylon Volunteers Force; 1902-1913	Succeeded by Gorden Fraser acting Commander
Preceded by Gorden Fraser acting Commander	Commander of the Ceylon Volunteers Force; 1913-1913	Succeeded by R. B. Fell as Commander of the Ceylon Defence Force
