= W. G. B. Dickson =

Ceylon Defence Force acting commander (fl. 1914)

Lieutenant-Colonel W. G. B. Dickson
- Military career
- Allegiance: British Ceylon
- Branch: Ceylon Defence Force
- Rank: Lieutenant-Colonel
- Commands: Commander of the Ceylon Defence Force

Lieutenant-Colonel W. G. B. Dickson was an acting Commander of the Ceylon Defence Force. He was appointed on 6 March 1914. He was succeeded by the acting Edward James Hayward.

Military offices
Preceded by R. B. Fell	Commander of the Ceylon Defence Force; 1914-?	Succeeded by Edward James Hayward acting Commander
