= Robert Burton Leslie =

Brigadier Robert Burton Leslie MC
- Born: October 7, 1891; Cork
- Died: July 12, 1976 (aged 84); Devon
- Military career
- Allegiance: British Ceylon
- Branch: Ceylon Defence Force
- Rank: Brigadier
- Unit: Royal Lincolnshire Regiment
- Commands: Commander of the Ceylon Defence Force

Brigadier Robert Burton Leslie MC (7 October 1891 – 12 July 1976) was the 8th Commander of the Ceylon Defence Force. He was appointed on 3 March 1935 until 12 May 1937. He was succeeded by Gordon Thorne.

He served in the Lincolnshire Regiment in World War I and was awarded an MC in the 1916 Birthday Honours.

Military offices
Preceded by Edward Bromfield Ferrers	Commander of the Ceylon Defence Force; 1935-1937	Succeeded by Gordon Thorne
