= Robert Black Fell =

Brigadier-General Robert Black Fell CB CBE
- Born: 5 November 1859; Finsthwaite, Lancashire, England
- Died: 22 March 1934 (aged 74); London, England
- Military career
- Allegiance: British Ceylon
- Branch: Ceylon Defence Force
- Rank: Brigadier-General
- Unit: Scottish Rifles
- Commands: Commander of the Ceylon Defence Force

Brigadier-General Robert Black Fell CB CBE (5 November 1859 – 22 March 1934) was the 4th Commander of the Ceylon Defence Force. He was appointed on 1 June 1913 until 6 March 1914, and again until 31 December 1919. He was succeeded by the acting W. G. B. Dickson and again by Thomas Howard Chapman.

== Military career ==
His military career began in May 1878 when he graduated from the Royal Military College, Sandhurst, and was commissioned as a second lieutenant into the 90th Regiment of Foot, later the Cameronians (Scottish Rifles).

He was appointed a Companion of the Order of the Bath (CB) in January 1916.

Military offices
Preceded by A. F. C. Vincent	Commander of the Ceylon Defence Force; 1913-1914	Succeeded by W. G. B. Dickson acting Commander
Preceded by Edward James Hayward acting Commander	Commander of the Ceylon Defence Force; 1917-1919	Succeeded by Thomas Howard Chapman acting Commander
