= R. A. McGeorge =

British colonial officer

Colonel R. A. McGeorge
- Military career
- Allegiance: British Ceylon
- Branch: Ceylon Defence Force
- Rank: Colonel
- Commands: Commander of the Ceylon Defence Force

Colonel R. A. McGeorge was the 12th Commander of the Ceylon Defence Force. He was appointed in 1945 until 1946. He was succeeded by the acting Randolph Jewell Francis Mendis.

Military offices
Preceded by T. G. Watson	Commander of the Ceylon Defence Force; 1945-1946	Succeeded by Randolph Jewell Francis Mendis as acting Commander of the Ceylon Defence Force & Ceylon Volunteers Force
