= Beechmount =

Beechmount may refer to:

- Beechmount, Edinburgh, Scotland, usually considered part of Murrayfield
- Beechmount, Belfast, an electoral ward of West Belfast, Northern Ireland
- Beechmount, Rathkeale, home of Albert Gregory Waller and the ancestral seat of the Waller baronetcy in Ireland
