= T. G. Watson =

Colonel T. G. Watson
- Military career
- Allegiance: British Ceylon
- Branch: Ceylon Defence Force
- Rank: Colonel
- Unit: 8th King's Royal Irish Hussars
- Commands: Commander of the Ceylon Defence Force

Colonel T. G. Watson was the 11th Commander of the Ceylon Defence Force. He was appointed from 1 January 1942 until 1945. He was succeeded by R. A. McGeorge.

Military offices
Preceded by Reginald Strelley Moresby White	Commander of the Ceylon Defence Force; 1942-1945	Succeeded by R. A. McGeorge
