= Basil Blackett =

Basil Blackett may refer to:

- Basil Blackett (civil servant) (1882–1935), British civil servant and expert on international finance
- Basil Blackett (RAF officer) (1886–1920), British First World War flying ace
