= F. G. M. Rowley =

British Army officer

Brigadier-General F. G. M. Rowley CB CMG DSO
- Born: 4 January 1866
- Died: 28 July 1949 (aged 83)
- Military career
- Allegiance: British Ceylon
- Branch: Ceylon Defence Force
- Service years: 1886–1927
- Rank: Brigadier-General
- Commands: Commander of the Ceylon Defence Force

Brigadier-General Frank George Mathias Rowley, CB, CMG, DSO (4 January 1866 – 28 July 1949) was a British Army officer and the 5th commander of the Ceylon Defence Force from 1920 to 1927.

Rowley was educated at Highgate School. He was commissioned into the British Army as a lieutenant in the Middlesex Regiment on 30 January 1886, and promoted to captain on 21 February 1895. In 1901 he was commandant of the Poonamallee depot serving the Madras Army. The following year he was in October 1902 seconded for staff service, and appointed deputy assistant adjutant-general in Rangoon.

He served in World War I, where he was promoted on 1 September 1914 to lieutenant colonel and commanded the 56th Infantry Brigade, being promoted in June 1916 to the temporary rank of brigadier general in place of Casimir Cartwright van Straubenzee. His substantive rank was upgraded to colonel in September 1918.

He retired from the army in August 1919 and was granted the honorary rank of brigadier general.

He was appointed commander of the Ceylon Defence Forces on 22 July 1920, and served until 8 February 1927. He was succeeded by Albion Earnest Andrews.

Military offices
Preceded by Thomas Howard Chapman acting Commander	Commander of the Ceylon Defence Force; 1920-1927	Succeeded by Albion Earnest Andrews
