= Edwin James Hayward =

British soldier

Colonel Sir Edwin James Hayward CBE VD
- Born: 24 December 1868; Camberwell, Surrey, England
- Died: 14 November 1929 (aged 60); Ceylon
- Military career
- Allegiance: British Ceylon
- Branch: Ceylon Defence Force
- Rank: Colonel
- Nickname: Edwin James Hayward
- Commands: Commander of the Ceylon Defence Force

Colonel Sir Edwin James Hayward, CBE, VD (24 December 1868 – 14 November 1929) was a British soldier who was acting Commander of the Ceylon Defence Force. He was appointed on 6 March 1914.

He was appointed a Commander of the Order of the British Empire (CBE) in 1923 and knighted in 1927.

Military offices
Preceded by W. G. B. Dickson acting Commander	Commander of the Ceylon Defence Force; 1914-?	Succeeded by R. B. Fell
