= Ceylon Volunteer Service Medal =

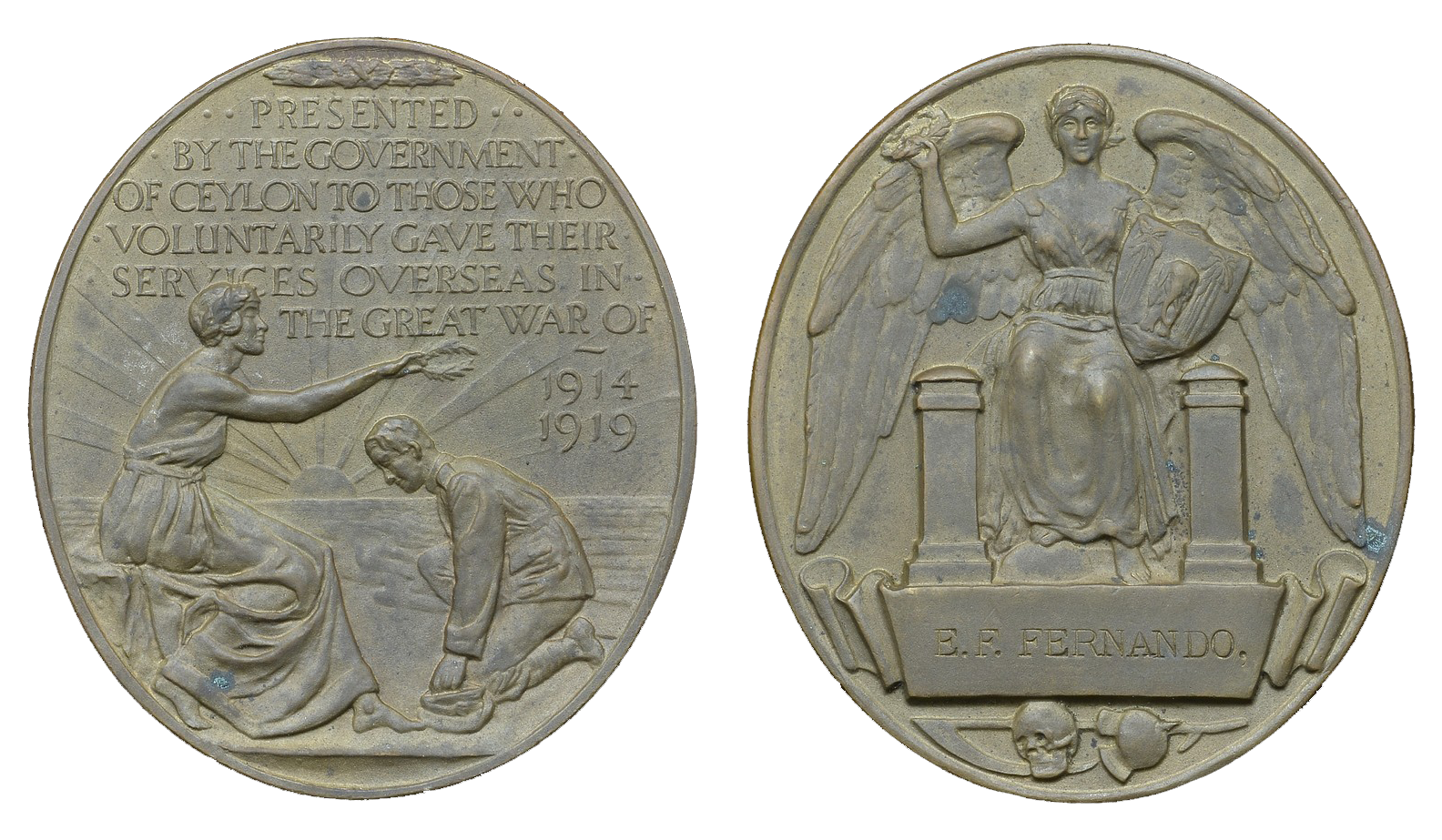
- Obverse (left), reverse (right)
- Type: Non-wearable campaign medal
- Presented by: Ceylon
- Eligibility: All overseas combatants from Ceylon
- Campaign: World War I

Highlights
- Total: ~3000

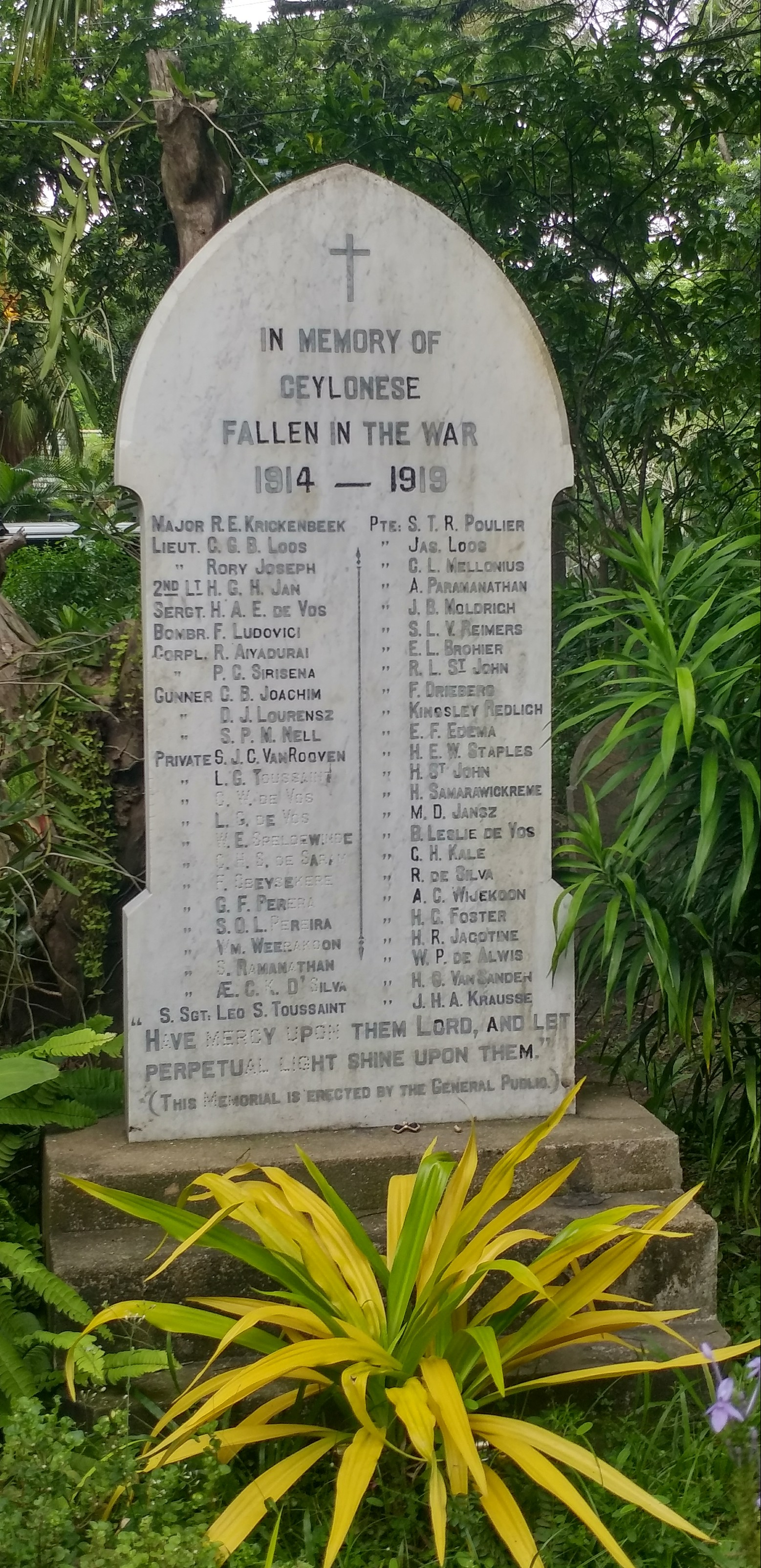
Memorial/headstone to Ceylon's World War 1 fallen

The Ceylon Volunteer Service Medal (sometimes referred to as the Government of Ceylon War Medal) is a non-wearable campaign medal awarded by the Government of Ceylon to all members of the Ceylonese armed forces that volunteered for overseas service during World War I. The exact number of medals struck is disputed, with sources citing numbers between 450 and 3000. The medal was the only one of its kind, Ceylon being the only British crown colony to issue a medal of its own for its citizens' service in the war. Those awarded the medal were servicemen of the Ceylon Defence Force (including the all-European Ceylon Planters' Rifle Corps).

== Design ==
The medal was cast in bronze, having dimensions of 45 x 52 x 3 mm. The obverse depicts the personification of Ceylon- a seated, right-facing robed and laureate female figure placing, with her right hand, a laurel wreath crown on the bowed head of a left-facing soldier kneeling on his left knee. The soldier rests his cap on the ground with his right hand, while the background depicts a multi-rayed sun setting into the sea behind them. An inscription above the scene reads:

..PRESENTED..

BY THE GOVERNMENT
OF CEYLON TO THOSE WHO
VOLUNTARILY GAVE THEIR
SERVICES OVERSEAS IN
THE GREAT WAR OF –
1914

1919

Above the words is a short piece of laurel wreath, bound.

The reverse depicts a front-facing illustration of Victory- a winged, robed and laureate female figure seated on a throne. Her right hand is raised aloft, holding a laurel wreath, while her left holds a shield emblazoned with the coat of arms of Ceylon. A plaque inscribed with the recipient's name is located at the figure's feet, above a skull and spiked helmet obscuring a horizontal scythe.

== See also ==
- Military awards and decorations of Sri Lanka
