= Thomas Howard Chapman =

Lieutenant-Colonel Thomas Howard Chapman OBE VD
- Military career
- Allegiance: British Ceylon
- Branch: Ceylon Defence Force
- Rank: Lieutenant-Colonel
- Commands: Commander of the Ceylon Defence Force

Lieutenant-Colonel Thomas Howard Chapman, OBE, VD was director of public works of Ceylon and acting commander of the Ceylon Defence Force. He was appointed on 1 January 1920 until 21 July 1920. He was succeeded by F. M. G. Rowley.

Military offices
Preceded by R. B. Fell	Commander of the Ceylon Defence Force; 1920	Succeeded by F. M. G. Rowley
