= Reginald White (British Army officer) =

British Army officer

Colonel Reginald White CBE
- Military career
- Allegiance: British Ceylon
- Branch: Ceylon Defence Force
- Rank: Colonel
- Unit: Leicestershire Regiment
- Commands: Commander of the Ceylon Defence Force

Colonel Reginald Strelley Moresby White CBE was the 10th Commander of the Ceylon Defence Force. He was appointed on 6 February 1939 until 1 January 1942. He was succeeded by T. G. Watson.

== First-class cricket ==
While studying at the University of Oxford, White played first-class cricket for Oxford University, making his debut against Sussex at Hove in 1913. He played first-class cricket for Oxford University in 1913 and 1914, making five appearances. He later played first-class matches for the Europeans in 1924, and the British Army cricket team in 1930. He also played one minor counties cricket match for Lincolnshire in 1913.

Military offices
Preceded by Gordon Thorne	Commander of the Ceylon Defence Force; 1939-1942	Succeeded by T. G. Watson
