= Ceylon Mounted Rifles =

- Active: 1887-1938
- Country: Ceylon
- Branch: Ceylon Defence Force
- Type: Mounted Infantry
- Role: Cavalry, Mounted Infantry, Motorised infantry
- Size: 2 Squadrons
- Part of: British Army
- Garrison/HQ: Kandy
- Nickname: The Horse
- Engagements: Second Boer War; World War I World War II

Ceylon Mounted Rifles (a.k.a. The Horse) was the only cavalry regiment attached to the Ceylon Defence Force which was the predecessor to the Sri Lanka Army prior to 1949 when the Ceylon Army was formed. It was a volunteer (reserve) regiment was based in Colombo made up of only of British.

== History ==
The regiment start out as the cavalry element of the Ceylon Light Infantry attached to the Ceylon Light Infantry Volunteers in 1887 (that was in 1910 renamed Ceylon Defence Force) and was named as the Ceylon Mounted Infantry (CMI) .

In 1897, the regiment was represented at the Diamond Jubilee Celebrations of Queen Victoria, in full dress uniform, which consisted of white helmet, scarlet tunic, white breeches and jack boots.

The first deployment of the regiment can in 1900 a company-sized force under the command of Major Murray Menzies, was sent to South Africa for the Boer War experiencing combat at Stinkhoutboom, Cape Colony, Driefontein, Johannesburg, Diamond Hill and Wittebergen. After the CMI was withdrawn, another company-sized force from the Ceylon Planters Rifle Corps was in 1902 dispatched to South Africa. The overall conduct of Ceylon troops received accolades from General Kitchener, Chief of Staff to Lord Roberts in South Africa, who affirmed, "The Ceylon Contingent did very good work in South Africa I only wish we had more of them." For the service in South Africa a regimental guidon was presented by Prince George, Duke of York (later King George V), on the occasion of his visit to Kandy. On February 18, 1901 Governor of Ceylon Sir West Ridgeway unveiled a Memorial Window in St. Paul's Church, Kandy for the eight members of the CMI who had been killed in the Boer War. Shortly thereafter regiment was represented at the coronation of King Edward VII by a contingent under the command of Lieut. J.N. Campbell. The unit was based in Kandy and regularly gave Mounted Escorts for members of the Royal family who visited Ceylon.

In 1906 the CMI was renamed the Ceylon Mounted Rifles and shortly had created a mechanized squadron. It was mobilized for war in 1914 when World War I started. In 1928 the CMR Polo Club was formed.

On Armistice Day 1931, the old regimental guidon was laid up for safe keeping at St. Paul's Church, Kandy where the second was laid up for safe keeping after the regiment was disbanded. With the demise of cavalry warfare the regiment was disbanded in 1938. At its disbandment most of its personal were transferred to the Ceylon Planters Rifle Corps.

== Notable members ==
- Lieutenant Basil Blackett - British World War I flying ace
- Charles Edward Hudson - served in CMR while employed on a tea plantation before World War I. Later won Victoria Cross serving with British Army in the Sherwood Foresters (1918).

== Units ==
- Mounted Squadron
- Motorized Squadron

== Alliances ==
- United Kingdom - 17th/21st Lancers

== Notes and references ==
- regiments.org
- Ceylon Mounted Rifles
- Brief History of the Ceylon Mounted Rifles. Compiled by Major Anton Edema, SLLI

== External links and sources ==
- Ceylon Defence Force
- The old Rifles barracks
- The old Rifles mess
