= Randolph Jewell Francis Mendis =

Colonel Randolph Jewell Francis Mendis OBE ED
- Military career
- Allegiance: British Ceylon
- Branch: Ceylon Defence Force
- Rank: Colonel
- Unit: Ceylon Cadet Battalion
- Commands: Ceylon Defence Force, Ceylon Cadet Battalion
- Conflicts: World War II
- Awards: Officer of the Order of the British Empire, Efficiency Decoration

Colonel Randolph Jewell Francis Mendis, OBE, ED (10 July 1896 – 19??) was a Ceylonese educationist. He served as the Deputy Director of Education, Acting Commandant of the Ceylon Defence Force and the first Ceylonese Commanding Officer, Ceylon Cadet Battalion.

== Education service ==
He gained a BA from the University of London. Mendis started his career by joining the assisted school teaching service in 1916 and served until 1929, during this time he taught at Prince of Wales College. He then joined the Education Department as an Assistant Inspector of Schools in 1930 and he was promoted District Inspector of Schools in 1932; Divisional Inspector of Schools in 1934; Acting Third Assistant Director of Education in 1939; Temporary Additional Assistant Director of Education from 1939 to 1941; Acting Third Assistant Director of Education in 1941; Temporary Additional Assistant Director of Education from 1941 to 1942; Acting Second Assistant Director of Education in 1943; Second Assistant Director of Education in 1944; Acting First Assistant Director of Education from 1945 to 1946; Acting First Assistant Director of Education and Acting Deputy Director of Education between 1949 and 1950. On 4 February 1950, he was confirmed as Deputy Director of Education. He was a member of the Ceylon delegations to the UNESCO-IBE Conference in 1951 and to the 7th General Conference of UNESCO. He served as the Administrator of the UNESCO Seminar on Modern Languages at Nuwara Eliya in 1953.

== Military service ==
Mendis was commissioned as a volunteer officer in the Ceylon Cadet Battalion of the Ceylon Defense Force. Mendis served as the Air Raid Precaution Controller, Galle from 1942 to 1943 and was appointed commanding officer, Cadet Battalion in 1943 with the rank of lieutenant colonel and held the appointment till 1948, when he was succeeded by Lieutenant Colonel H.V.C. De Silva. Promoted to Brevet Colonel, Mendis who was seconded to the staff corp of the Ceylon Defense Force, served as the Acting Commandant of the Ceylon Defence Force from 6 April 1946 to 7 August 1949 as it reverted to its peace time formation following the demobilization after World War II. He was confirmed in the rank of Colonel. The Ceylon Defense Force was disbanded in August 1949 with the formation of the Ceylon Army in October 1949. He was awarded the Efficiency Decoration for service as a volunteer officer and was appointed Officer of the Order of the British Empire (OBE) in the 1948 Birthday Honours for his service in the staff corp of the Ceylon Defense Force.

== Family ==
He was married to Florence Mendis. They had one daughter Ranee Mendis Kanaka.

Military offices
Preceded by R. A. McGeorge	Commandant of the Ceylon Defence Force; 1946-1949	Succeeded by Post abolished Roderick Sinclair as Commander of the Army
