= Gorden Fraser =

Lieutenant-Colonel Gorden Fraser VD
- Military career
- Allegiance: British Ceylon
- Branch: Ceylon Defence Force
- Rank: Lieutenant-Colonel
- Commands: Commander of the Ceylon Volunteers Force

Lieutenant-Colonel Gorden Fraser VD was an acting Commander of the Ceylon Volunteers Force. He was appointed on 14 March 1913 until 13 May 1913.

Military offices
| Preceded by A. F. C. Vincent | Commander of the Ceylon Volunteers Force; 1913-1913 | Succeeded by A. F. C. Vincent |
