= Albion Earnest Andrews =

Colonel Albion Earnest Andrews OBE
- Born: 16 June 1877; Wells, Somerset, England
- Died: 14 December 1928 (aged 51); Chertsey, Surrey, England
- Military career
- Allegiance: British Ceylon
- Branch: Ceylon Defence Force
- Rank: Colonel
- Unit: Hampshire Regiment
- Commands: Commander of the Ceylon Defence Force

Colonel Albion Earnest Andrews, OBE (16 June 1877 – 14 December 1928) was the 6th Commander of the Ceylon Defence Force. He was appointed on 9 February 1927 until 14 December 1928. He was succeeded by the acting G. B. Stevens.

Andrews was commissioned as a second lieutenant into the 3rd (Royal Denbigh and Flint Militia) Battalion, Royal Welsh Fusiliers (later the Royal Welch Fusiliers) in March 1896. He transferred to a Regular Army commission in the Hampshire Regiment (later the Royal Hampshire Regiment) in May 1898, and was promoted to lieutenant on 22 October 1899. He served with the 1st Battalion of the regiment, was for a time seconded, but was back as a regular lieutenant in his regiment in October 1902.

During the First World War, he served with the 11th Royal Sussex Regiment and the Hampshire Regiment.

Military offices
Preceded by F. M. G. Rowley	Commander of the Ceylon Defence Force; 1927-1928	Succeeded by G. B. Stevens acting Commander
