= H. G. Morris =

Major H. G. Morris
- Military career
- Allegiance: British Ceylon
- Branch: Ceylon Defence Force
- Rank: Major
- Unit: Duke of Cornwall's Light Infantry
- Commands: Commander of the Ceylon Volunteers Force

Major H. G. Morris was an acting Commander of the Ceylon Volunteers Force in 1902.

Military offices
Preceded by A. F. C. Vincent	Commander of the Ceylon Volunteers Force; 1902-1902	Succeeded by A. F. C. Vincent
