= Edward Bromfield Ferrers =

Colonel Edward Bromfield Ferrers DSO
- Military career
- Allegiance: British Ceylon
- Branch: Ceylon Defence Force
- Rank: Colonel
- Unit: Black Watch
- Commands: Commander of the Ceylon Defence Force

Colonel Edward Bromfield Ferrers DSO was the 7th Commander of the Ceylon Defence Force. He was appointed on 29 April 1929 until 3 March 1935. He was succeeded by Robert Burton Lesley.

Military offices
Preceded by G. B. Stevens acting Commander	Commander of the Ceylon Defence Force; 1929-1935	Succeeded by Robert Burton Lesley
