= SS Rooseboom =

Dutch steamship, sunk in the second world war

History

Netherlands
- Name: SS Rooseboom
- Owner: Koninklijke Paketvaart-Maatschappij
- Builder: Rijkee & Co
- Yard number: 174
- Launched: 1926
- Identification: Official number 5606521
- Fate: Sunk, 1 March 1942

General characteristics
- Type: Steam ship
- Tonnage: 1,035 GRT
- Length: 70.1 m (230 ft)
- Beam: 11.6 m (38 ft)
- Draft: 3.2 m (10 ft)
- Installed power: Compound steam engine 67 hp (50 kW)
- Speed: 10 knots (19 km/h; 12 mph)

SS Rooseboom was a 1,035 ton Dutch steamship owned by KPM (Koninklijke Paketvaart-Maatschappij (or Royal Packet Navigation Company) of the Netherlands East Indies built in 1926 by Rijkee & Co of Rotterdam, the Netherlands.

== The sinking ==
In February 1942 British Malaya and Singapore surrendered to the Imperial Japanese Army. Over 100,000 British and British Empire military personnel became prisoners-of-war as well as thousands of civilians. A few thousand more escaped to the nearby Netherlands East Indies and from there to Australia, Ceylon or India in any ship that could be found. Many of these ships were lost to Japanese attacks among the islands scattered around Sumatra and Java while attempting to escape. Rooseboom under Captain Marinus Cornelis Anthonie Boon, was taking around 500 passengers (mainly British military personnel and civilians) from Padang to Colombo in Ceylon.

On 1 March 1942 at 11:35pm Rooseboom was steaming in the Indian Ocean west of Sumatra when she was spotted by the Imperial Japanese Navy submarine I-59 (which later was renumbered I-159) under the command of Lieutenant Commander Yoshimatsu Tamori and torpedoed. Rooseboom capsized and sank rapidly at 00°15′N 086°50′E, leaving one lifeboat and 135 people in the water. Eighty people were in the lifeboat, which designed to hold 28; the rest clung to flotsam or floated in the sea. The Dutch freighter Palopo picked up two of the survivors nine days later. Until the end of the World War II they were assumed to be the only survivors.

== The lifeboat ==
The story of the survivors on the lifeboat was told by Walter Gardiner Gibson (a corporal from the British Army′s Argyll and Sutherland Highlanders) in a book in 1952; he is the only known surviving witness of the events that occurred on the lifeboat over the 26 days after Roosebaum sank. His tale was told to the British authorities after the war but was first heard publicly in court in Edinburgh, Scotland, in 1949 in order to confirm that Major Angus Macdonald was dead so that his estate could be settled.

According to Gibson, in and around the lifeboat were an estimated 135 survivors, many with injuries, including Gibson himself, who was in the lifeboat due to those injuries. Among the survivors were the Captain M.C.A. Boon and the senior surviving British officer Brigadier Archibald Paris (who had commanded the 15th Indian Infantry Brigade during the Battle of Malaya). There were also two other Argyll officers aboard Rooseboom; Major Angus Macdonald, second in command of the Argylls and Captain Mike Blackwood. These two officers were chiefly responsible for holding up a Japanese tank column during the Battle of Bukit Timah. Paris, MacDonald, Blackwood and number of the other military passengers were among a selected few of the most proven fighters chosen to be evacuated instead of being lost to a POW camp. By the time the boat had drifted for more than 1,000 miles (1,600 km), to ground on a coral reef less than 100 miles (160 km) from Padang, Rooseboom's starting point, only five of its 80 passengers remained alive, and one of those drowned in the surf while trying to land.

In Gibson's account the ordeal that followed the sinking showed the worst of human nature under some of the most extreme conditions. On the first night many of those in the water drowned or gave up. Some twenty men built a raft from flotsam and towed it behind the boat. The raft slowly sank and all twenty perished three days later. In the first few days discipline collapsed men and women went mad with thirst, some drinking sea water, which sent them into hallucinations. Many threw themselves overboard rather than face further suffering, and a gang of five renegade soldiers positioned themselves in the bows and at night systematically pushed the weaker survivors overboard to make the meagre rations go further. Gibson claims to have organised an attack on the renegades with a group of others who rushed them and pushed them en masse into the sea. Brigadier Paris died, hallucinating before he fell into his final coma. The Dutch captain was killed by one of his own engineers. Towards the end Gibson realised that all who remained alive were himself, another white man, a Chinese woman named Doris Lim and four Javanese seamen. That night the Javanese attacked the other white man, killed and then ate part of him. Later the oldest Javanese died.

The lifeboat fetched up on Sipora an island off Sumatra and only 100 miles (160 km) from Padang where Rooseboom started her journey 30 days earlier. One of the Javanese seaman drowned in the surf while the other two disappeared into the jungle and have never been found. After a period of being treated by some of the local population Doris Lin and Gibson were discovered by a Japanese patrol. Gibson was returned to Padang as a POW while Lim was shot as a spy soon afterwards.

Gibson told his story in the book The Boat published in 1952 and in a second book Highland Laddie in 1954. He died in Canada, where he had settled, on 24 March 2005, aged 90.

== Senior officer casualties ==
Many of the officers and men who boarded Rooseboom were evacuated from Singapore because of their specialist knowledge or skills and would therefore have been men of some importance to the war effort.

- Brigadier Archibald Paris (CO 12th Indian Brigade)
- Colonel Richard Louis Mortimer Rosenberg (Royal Corps of Signals, Malaya Command)
- Group Captain Reginald Lewis Nunn, DSO (Director of Public Works, Singapore; CO Malayan Volunteer Air Force; a former Major of Royal Engineers)
- Lt.Col. John Pelham Acworth (AA & QMG of the 11th Indian Infantry Division)
- Lt.Col. Divan Chand Chopra, OBE (Indian Medical Service)
- Lt.Col. William Abbott Gale Douglas (Indian Army Ordnance Corps, 11th Indian Infantry Division)
- Lt.Col. Augustus Harry Ives (CO 10 Section, Royal Army Ordnance Corps, Malaya Command)
- Lt.Col. George Archdale Palmer (Royal Engineers and AQMG of Malaya Command)
- Lt.Col. Gordon Calthrop Thorne DSO (CO 2nd Battalion, The Cambridgeshire Regiment)
- Lt.Col. Geoffrey Harley Douglas Woollcombe (CO 2/2nd King Edward VII Gurkha Rifles)
- Major Noel Howard Wyatt Corrie (Royal Engineers)
- Major Richard Clinton Wilkinson Dent (2/12th Frontier Force Regiment – Brigade-Major, 8th Indian Infantry Brigade)
- Major Charles Angus Moreton Macdonald (Argyll and Sutherland Highlanders)

== Other known passengers ==
- Roger Owen Wingfield Marchant Davis – Assistant Commissioner of Police for the Federated Malaya States
- Geoffrey Edward Devonshire – Assistant Superintendent of Police, Singapore
- Sgt. Percy Saunders (Royal Army Ordnance Corps)
- Willem de Vries, first officer on SS Rooseboom

Percy Saunders, football player

Bernard Maurice Kauffman

== Sources ==
- Smith, Colin (2005). Singapore Burning. Penguin. ISBN 978-0-670-91341-1.
- Gibson, Walter (2007) [1952]. The Boat. Monsoon. ISBN 978-981-05-8301-9.
