= Archibald Paris (Royal Marines officer) =

British general (1861–1937)

Major-General Sir Archibald Paris KCB
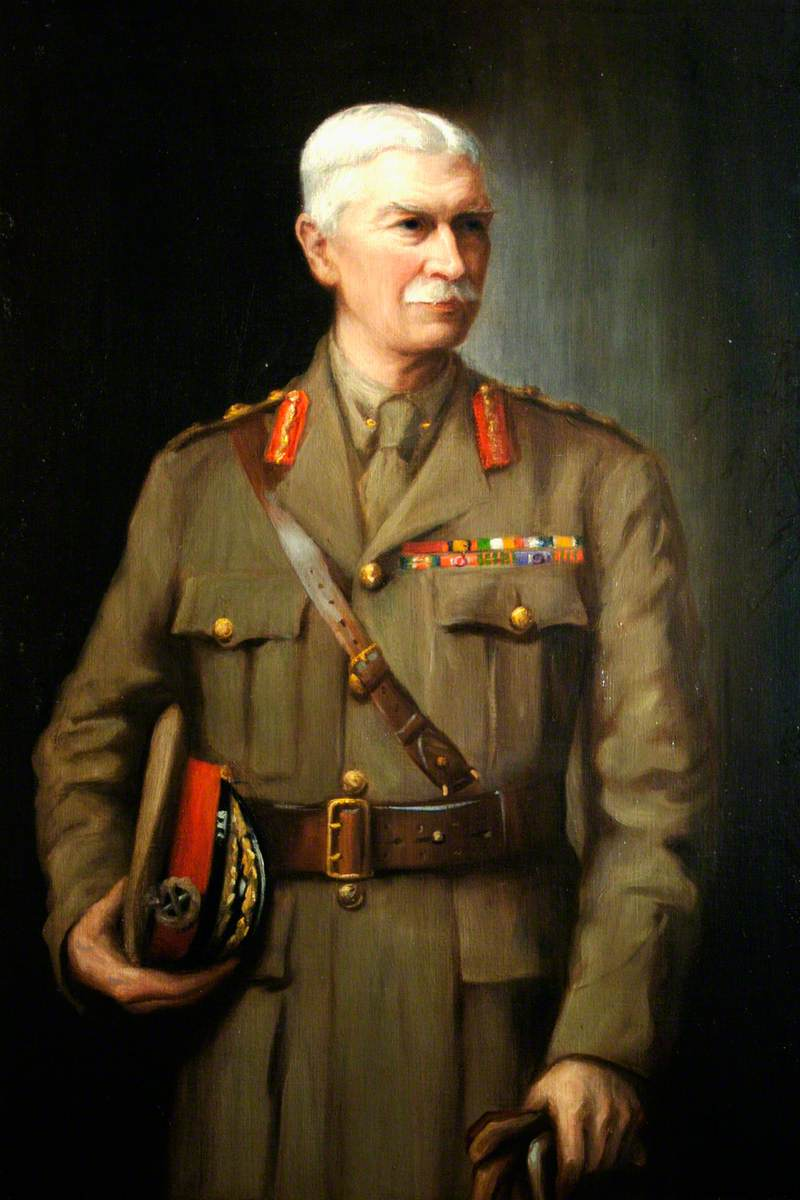
- Paris in 1920 by Helen Donald-Smith
- Born: 9 November 1861
- Died: 30 October 1937 (aged 75)
- Relatives: Brigadier Archibald Paris (son)
- Military career
- Allegiance: United Kingdom
- Branch: Royal Marines
- Service years: 1879 – 1917
- Rank: Major-General
- Commands: Royal Naval Division
- Conflicts: Second Boer War; First World War
- Awards: Knight Commander of the Order of the Bath; Commander of the Order of Leopold (Belgium); Croix de guerre (Belgium); Legion of Honour (France); Croix de guerre (France)

Major-General Sir Archibald Paris, KCB (9 November 1861 – 30 October 1937) was a Royal Marine officer who commanded the Royal Naval Division in the First World War. His son, Brigadier Archibald Paris, served in the Second World War in Malaya.

== Military career ==
Paris was commissioned a lieutenant in the Royal Marine Artillery on 1 September 1879, promoted to captain on 7 May 1890, and to major on 18 August 1898. He served as an artillery officer to the Rhodesian Field Force in South Africa during the Second Boer War, and received a brevet promotion to lieutenant colonel in the South African Honours list, published on 26 June 1902.

Following the end of the war, in late May 1902, he continued on special service in South Africa, but he returned to the United Kingdom on the SS Syria two months later, arriving in Southampton in early September 1902.

From January 1903, Paris was a professor at the Royal Military Academy, Woolwich. He was promoted to brevet colonel in September 1905 and, made a KCB in the 1907 Birthday Honours, lieutenant colonel in July 1908.

In December 1913 he was appointed an inspector of recruiting and, in July 1914, after having served six years continuously as a lieutenant colonel, he was placed on supplementary half-pay.

In September 1914, just a few weeks after the British entry into World War I, Paris was promoted to the temporary rank of brigadier general and placed in command of the Royal Marine Brigade. Shortly afterwards, however, he was promoted to the temporary major general in October and took command of the Royal Naval Division from its concentration in Antwerp and he was seen to have preserved the particular identity and character of the division while it fought alongside the British Army. He was promoted from colonel second commandant to substantive major general, in recognition of his services in the field, on 16 October 1915, and was "noted for distinguished service in command of the Royal Naval Division" in November. He was appointed a Knight Commander of the Order of the Bath (KCB) in the 1916 New Year Honours. While in Belgium on 20 June 1917, he was wounded in the shoulder, the back and he lost his left leg and consequently had to relinquish his command. He retired from the military on account of his wounds in June 1917.

For his war service, Paris was made a Commander of the Belgian Order of Leopold (with Swords), awarded the Belgian Croix de guerre and the French Croix de Guerre.

Paris died at the age of 75 in Switzerland on 30 October 1937. He had a son, Archibald Paris, who served in the British Army, briefly commanding the Indian 11th Division during the Battle of Malaya.

== Bibliography ==
- Davies, Frank; Maddocks, Graham (2014) [1995]. Bloody Red Tabs: General Officer Casualties of the Great War 1914–1918. Pen and Sword Books. ISBN 978-1-78346-237-7.
