= Basil Blackett (RAF officer) =

British World War I flying ace

Basil John Blackett
- Born: 23 June 1886; Potters Bar, Middlesex, England
- Died: 22 April 1927 (aged 40); Pinner, Middlesex
- Military career
- Allegiance: United Kingdom; Australia
- Branch: British Army; Ceylon Defence Force; Australian Imperial Force; Royal Air Force
- Service years: 1900–1919
- Rank: Lieutenant
- Units: 2nd Bucks (Eton College) Volunteer Rifle Corps, OBLI; Ceylon Planters Rifle Corps; Ceylon Mounted Rifles; 1st Battalion, AN&MEF; 18th Battalion, AIF; 61st Battalion, AIF; 25 Squadron RFC; 43 Squadron RFC; 18 Squadron RFC; 102 Squadron RFC; No. 1 School of Navigation and Bomb Dropping, RAF
- Conflicts: World War I; Annexation of German New Guinea; Gallipoli campaign; Western Front
- Awards: Croix de guerre (Belgium)

Lieutenant Basil John Blackett (23 June 1886 – 22 April 1927) was a British World War I flying ace credited with five aerial victories as an observer and rear gunner while serving in the Australian Imperial Force, seconded to the Royal Flying Corps. In late 1918 he resigned his Australian commission to join the Royal Air Force.

== Biography ==
Blackett was born in Potters Bar, Middlesex, and educated at Eton College and Trinity College, Cambridge. Between 1900 and 1905, while at school, he served in the 2nd Bucks (Eton College) Volunteer Rifle Corps, attached to the Oxfordshire and Buckinghamshire Light Infantry, rising from private to colour sergeant. He joined the Ceylon Planters Rifle Corps in 1907, and was transferred to the Ceylon Mounted Rifles in 1909, serving as private and trooper.

On the outbreak of World War I Blackett was 28 years old and working in Australia as a racehorse trainer and jockey. On 11 August 1914 he volunteered to enlist in the Australian Imperial Force as a private.

On 19 August 1914 Blackett embarked aboard HMAS Berrima at Sydney, as a member of F Company, 1st (Tropical) Battalion, Australian Naval and Military Expeditionary Force (AN&MEF), bound for German New Guinea. Following the Australian occupation Blackett was employed on special duty at the Government Stores, Rabaul, from 1 October 1914, having been promoted to lance corporal on 29 September, and then to corporal on 29 October. On 20 November he was commissioned as a second lieutenant (on probation). However, Blackett contracted dysentery, and on 13 April he was sent back to Sydney to recuperate.

On 25 June he was promoted to lieutenant in the 18th Battalion, 5th Brigade. On 18 August Blackett and his battalion arrived at ANZAC Cove during the Gallipoli Campaign. He was wounded in the right knee on 22 August, during the Battle of Hill 60, and on 18 September, again fell ill with dysentery. He was evacuated to the Blue Sisters Hospital in Malta by 22 September, and by 9 October was at the No.3 General Hospital in Wandsworth, London.

Blackett was given extended leave in order to convalesce, and was judged to be sufficiently recovered by 21 February 1916 for general duties, and placed on the supernumerary list on the 24th. On 26 February he married Jean Mounsey Whittle of Moffat, Dumfriesshire, at the Registry Office on Henrietta Street in Covent Garden, London. They went on to have two daughters.

He finally rejoined the 18th Battalion a year later, on 25 February 1917, and was transferred to the 61st Battalion on 22 March. Selected for training as an observer/air gunner in the Australian Flying Corps, he was sent to No. 1 School of Instruction at Reading on 23 April. On 25 June he was posted to 25 Squadron RFC.

Blackett's first victory came on 5 August 1917, in an Airco DH.4 flown by Canadian Conrad Lally, when he destroyed an Albatros D.V over Pérenchies. On 3 September he and Lally shot down two more D.Vs over Quesnoy and Douai. Blackett spent four days attached to 43 Squadron RFC before transferring to 18 Squadron RFC on 13 October, also spending a week in February 1918 attached to 102 Squadron RFC. On 30 May 1918, flying with Irish pilot Albert G. Waller in a DH.4, he shot down two Fokker D.VII over Bac Saint-Maur. Finally, on 10 August, he returned to England to serve as a Navigation Instructor at the No. 1 School of Navigation and Bomb Dropping at RAF Stonehenge.

On 1 October 1918, having served with the Royal Flying Corps and Royal Air Force for 17 months, 13 of them in France as an observer, Blackett applied to be released from the Australian Imperial Force in order to accept a commission in the RAF. This was approved on 13 October, and he was officially released on the 31st. On 1 November he was commissioned as a lieutenant (observer officer) in the RAF. He eventually relinquished his Royal Air Force commission on 4 April 1919.

Blackett was living in Pinner, Middlesex, when he died on 22 April 1927.

== Awards ==
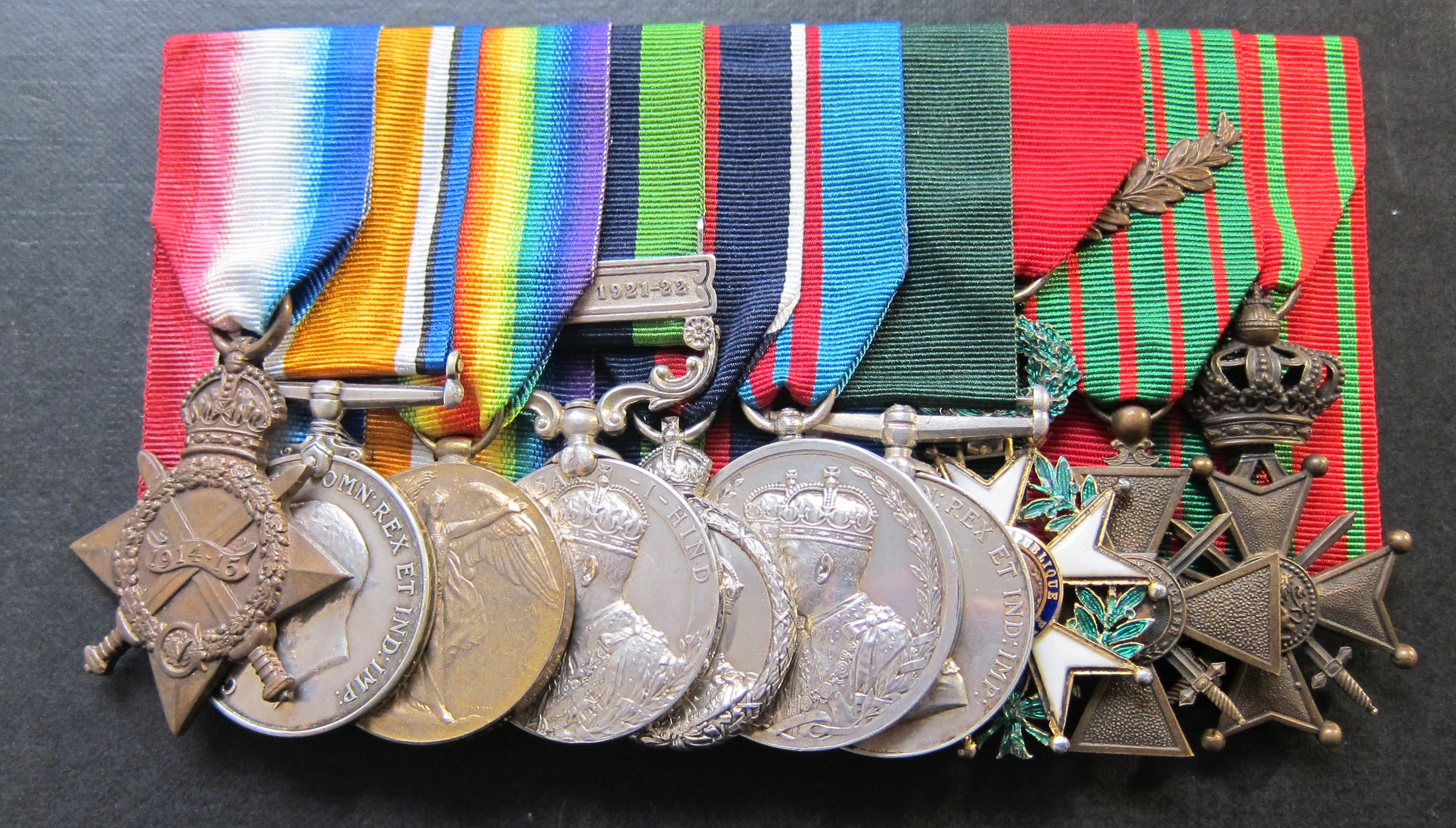
Basil John Blackett's medal group

In July 1918 Blackett was awarded the Croix de Guerre by the King of the Belgians. He also qualified for the award of the 1914–15 Star from Australia, and the War Medal and Victory Medal .

Blackett was also awarded an Indian General Service Medal with clasp "Malabar 1921-22" while serving as a Sergeant in the Southern Provinces Mounted Rifles, 1902 Coronation Medal, 1911 Delhi Durbar Medal, Volunteer Long Service and Good Conduct Medal, named Trooper 10 / Southern Provinces Mounted Rifles, and the French Légion d'honneur 5th Class and Croix de Guerre . The award of the Belgian Croix de Guerre is very rare to the Australian Flying Corps, this being one of only two confirmed awards.

== Cricket ==
Blackett was a keen cricketer, playing for the Middlesex Second XI in 1903, for the Public Schools team in 1904, and for Eton College in 1904–1905, appearing in the annual fixture against Harrow in 1905. In 1906 he played for Cricket Golfers, and made a single appearance for Hertfordshire in the Minor Counties Championship in July. He was also a long-standing member of the Marylebone Cricket Club, playing in numerous matches between 1906 and 1926.

== Bibliography ==
- "Australian Military Forces: Service Record of Basil John Blackett". National Archives of Australia. 2014. Archived from the original on 19 July 2012.
