= Thomas Sutherland (British Army officer) =

Thomas Douglas Sutherland
- Born: 1892; Stronsay, Orkney Islands, Scotland
- Died: 1946 (aged 53–54)
- Military career
- Allegiance: United Kingdom
- Branch: British Army
- Rank: Lieutenant-Colonel
- Units: Lincolnshire Regiment; Seaforth Highlanders of Canada
- Conflicts: First World War; Second World War
- Awards: Distinguished Service Order and Bar, Officer of the Order of the British Empire, Military Cross, Mentioned in Dispatches

Lieutenant-Colonel Thomas Douglas Sutherland DSO* OBE MC (1892–1946) was a British Army officer of the First and Second world wars.

Having been brought up in Orkney, Sutherland emigrated to Ceylon as a young man, where he enlisted in the Ceylon Planters Rifle Corps. On 25 November 1915 he was granted a commission and became a second lieutenant in the newly formed 6th (Service) Battalion of the Lincolnshire Regiment. He first saw action with his unit in the Gallipoli Campaign in 1915. He received the Military Cross during the Battle of the Somme in 1916 for successfully retrieving the body of his commanding officer from no man's land and assuming command of his company. Sutherland was wounded during the Battle of Messines on 7 June 1917, but by August was in command of 'B' Company of his battalion. He was awarded the Distinguished Service Order for his action on 22 August 1917 in the Battle of Passchendaele, successfully rallying a beleaguered company of men and effectively securing a position he had just taken. He was awarded a Bar to his DSO for gallantry and leadership during fighting on the Grand Honnelle River on 6 and 7 November 1918. Sutherland ended the war with the rank of major, having been mentioned in dispatches several times.

All four of his brothers also served in World War I. Two of his brothers, Anderson and Goodwin, died in the war.

After the First World War, he emigrated to Canada. Between the wars he married and lived in Sechelt, British Columbia, where he worked as a police officer in the British Columbia Provincial Police. Following the outbreak of the Second World War, Sutherland was commissioned into the Seaforth Highlanders on 28 January 1940. He served with the regiment in the Battle of France and was evacuated from Dunkirk. After Dunkirk, he was posted to Ethiopia and Eritrea to serve in the Military Police. Sutherland was invested as an Officer of the Order of the British Empire on 18 February 1943. On 16 June 1945 he resigned his commission due to disability and was granted the rank of honorary lieutenant-colonel. He died in Vancouver, British Columbia on 6 July 1946, age 54, and is buried in Mountain View Cemetery in Vancouver.
