= T. S. B. Sally =

Sri Lanka Army officer (1924–2012)

Tuan Samayraan Buhary Sally
- Born: 18 March 1924; Kandy, Sri Lanka
- Died: 3 August 2012 (aged 88); Colombo, Sri Lanka
- Spouse: Leila Dhaleel
- Children: Dilano, Shanaz, Zeena.
- Military career
- Allegiance: Sri Lanka
- Branch: Sri Lanka Army
- Rank: Brigadier
- Nickname: Tacky
- Unit: Sri Lanka Sinha Regiment
- Commands: Chief of Staff, Sri Lanka Army
- Conflicts: World War II; 1971 Insurrection
- Awards: Several awards and medals.

Brigadier Tuan Samayraan Buhary Sally (18 March 1924 – 3 August 2012) was a Sri Lanka Army officer, who served as the Chief of Staff of the Sri Lanka Army and was the first Malay and Muslim in the country to reach this rank and post.

== Ceylon Defense Force ==
Born and educated in Kandy, Sally joined the Ceylon Defence Force during World War II in 1942 and was commissioned as a second lieutenant in the 5th Battalion, Ceylon Light Infantry. He specialized as a ML 3-inch mortar platoon commander and was demobilized after the war with the rank of lieutenant. In 1947, he joined the Royal Military Police (Ceylon) serving in Singapore and Malaya. In 1948 he was promoted to captain.

== Ceylon Army ==
With the formation of the Ceylon Army he was commissioned as lieutenant in the 1st Battalion, Ceylon Light Infantry in 1950. The year after he was sent to the Small Arms School Corps at Netheravon. He participated in NATO manoeuvers with the British Army of the Rhine, Germany and on his return he was promoted to captain, and appointed adjutant of the battalion in 1955.

He transferred to the newly raised Ceylon Sinha Regiment in 1956 and was appointed company commander in 1957. Having attended a Company Commander's course at the School of Infantry, Warminster, he was promoted to Major in 1961. Was posted to the Army Training Center, Diyatalawa in 1963, and made acting commander of 1st Battalion, Gemunu Watch in 1965. He then attended a course in Tactics and Counter- Insurgency at Jungle Training Center, Canungra and promoted to the rank of lieutenant colonel and served as acting Commanding Officer, 1st Battalion Ceylon Light Infantry in 1967.

He was made the commanding officer of the 1st Battalion of the Sri Lanka Sinha Regiment in 1968, and was subsequently sent on a six months' training course in financial management at the United States Army Financial Management School and training in personnel management at the United States Army Adjutant General School both in Fort Benjamin Harrison. Subsequently, took up appointment at Army HQ Colombo. He was appointed extra aide-de-camp to President William Gopallawa and later to Prime Minister Sirimavo Bandaranaike in 1972. Promoted to Colonel in 1974.

Promoted to Brigadier on 5 August 1977. He was appointed chief of staff on 1 December 1977 until his retirement on 18 March 1979. He was acting commander on two occasions, on 18 February 1978 and 16 October 1978, and was the last officer from the Ceylon Defence Force to leave active service.

For wartime service in World War II, he had earned the Defence Medal (United Kingdom) and the War Medal 1939–1945, and for service in the Ceylon Army, he received the Queen Elizabeth II Coronation Medal, the Ceylon Armed Services Long Service Medal, the Sri Lanka Army 25th Anniversary Medal, President's Inauguration Medal, and the Ceylon Armed Services Inauguration Medal.

== Later life ==
Following his retirement he served as the first secretary general of The Sri Lanka Malay Confederation (SLAMAC); Vice president/patron- Colombo Malay Cricket Club; General secretary- Sri Lanka Malay Association; president- Sri Lanka- Indonesia Friendship Association (SLIFA); treasurer- Sri Lanka- Malaysia Friendship Association; chairman- Welfare Grants Committee, Sri Lanka Ex-Servicemen's Association (SLESA); representative member (Defence)- Organisation of Professional Associations of Sri Lanka (OPA); committee member- Sri Lanka Malay Association Rupee Fund; president- Association of Retired Flag Rank Officers (ARFRO) and president- Manning Lux Residencies.

== Illness and death ==
Brigadier Sally was hospitalised in June 2012 after suffering a stroke, which left him disabled on the right side of his body, and was in bed throughout this time. He died on 3 August 2012 at the Military Hospital, Horton Place, Colombo 7. At the age of 88, he was the oldest surviving officer in the armed forces from World War II. He was given a military funeral with full honours consisting of a 21 gun salute.
