= Bertie de Silva =

Sri Lankan cricketer

Personal information
- Full name: John Albert de Silva
- Born: 19 January 1901; Colombo, Ceylon
- Died: 30 November 1981 (aged 80); Colombo
- Batting: Left-handed
- Bowling: Right-arm medium

Domestic team information
- Years: Team
- 1924 to 1927: Oxford University

Career statistics
Competition	First-class
Matches	8
Runs scored	214
Batting average	19.45
100s/50s	0/1
Top score	65
Balls bowled	432
Wickets	4
Bowling average	46.75
5 wickets in innings	0
10 wickets in match	0
Best bowling	1/5
Catches/stumpings	4/0
- Source: Cricinfo, 17 April 2017

John Albert "Bertie" de Silva (19 January 1901 – 30 November 1981) was a cricketer who played five matches of first-class cricket for Oxford University in England between 1924 and 1927 and three first-class matches for Dr J Rockwood's Ceylon XI in Ceylon between 1929 and 1930.

De Silva's most successful first-class match was for Oxford University against Harlequins in 1927, when he scored 25 and 65. He returned to Ceylon after graduating. He served in the Forest Department from 1927 to 1957. He was head of the department, with the title Conservator of Forests, from 1950 to 1957.
