= Albert Gregory Waller =

Irish flying ace

- Born: 15 October 1890; Galway, Ireland
- Died: 1967 (aged 76–77); Beechmount, Rathkeale, County Limerick, Ireland
- Military career
- Allegiance: United Kingdom
- Branch: British Army; Royal Air Force
- Service years: 1914–1919; 1940–1943
- Rank: Captain
- Units: Army Service Corps; No. 55 Squadron RFC; No. 18 Squadron RFC/RAF
- Conflicts: World War I • Western Front; World War II
- Awards: Military Cross

Major Albert Gregory Waller MC (15 October 1890 – 1967) was an Irish flying ace of the First World War, credited with eleven aerial victories. He would return to Britain's military service during the Second World War.

== Family background ==
Waller was born in Galway, Ireland. His family were descendants of Richard Waller, a lieutenant in Cromwell's New Model Army during the conquest of Ireland, who was awarded Castle Cully and its lands near Newport, County Tipperary in 1666. Richard Waller's great-grandson William Thomas Waller married Eliza Augusta Guinness, the granddaughter of Arthur Guinness. His eldest son George Arthur Waller became Guinness' Chief Brewer and engineer, while his fourth son Francis Albert Waller was the managing director of Banagher Maltings (F.A. Waller & Co. Ltd.) in Shannon Grove, County Galway, near Banagher, County Offaly. Francis Albert Waller married Frances Otway on 7 September 1872, and they had nine children, of whom Albert Gregory Waller was the youngest.

== World War I ==
Waller was commissioned as a temporary second lieutenant to serve in the Army Service Corps on 7 September 1914, alongside his brother William Hastings de Warrenne Waller (who also became a pilot, eventually retiring from the RAF with the rank of wing commander in 1935.) He was promoted to lieutenant on 6 November 1914, and to captain on 5 September 1915. Waller transferred to the Royal Flying Corps to train as a pilot, being granted Royal Aero Club Aviators' Certificate No. 4015 after soloing a Henri Farman biplane at the Military School, Joyce Green, on 3 December 1916. He was appointed a flying officer and transferred to the General List on 10 February 1917.

Waller served in No. 55 Squadron RFC for three months before being posted to No. 18 Squadron RFC in early 1918, where he was appointed a flight commander on 12 February 1918. Flying an Airco DH.4 two-seater Waller was credited with eleven aerial victories between 6 March and 30 May 1918, though he shared three of those wins with other air crews whose pilots included Herbert Gould and Alfred Atkey. Waller's final victorious sortie brought his observer, Basil Blackett, to acedom. Overall, Waller destroyed three enemy aircraft (including one shared triumph) and drove down eight others down out of control while accomplishing his missions.

Waller was subsequently awarded the Military Cross, which was gazetted on 16 September 1918. His citation read:

Temporary Captain Albert Gregory Waller, General List and Royal Air Force.

"For conspicuous gallantry and devotion to duty. He has led fifteen successful bombing raids, twenty-two low bombing and reconnaissance flights and eight successful photographic flights. In addition he has destroyed five enemy machines. As a flight commander he has shown initiative and enterprise both in the air and on the ground, and the excellent work done by the flight under his command is entirely due to his fine example and untiring energy."

On 23 October 1918, shortly before the armistice brought an end to hostilities, he was granted the acting rank of major. On 22 January 1919 Waller received a mention in despatches "in respect of the valuable services ... rendered in connection with the war" while serving in the Air Ministry. He was transferred to the RAF's unemployed list on 3 February 1919.

=== List of aerial victories ===
Combat record
No.	Date/Time	Aircraft/ Serial No.	Opponent	Result	Location	Notes
1	6 March 1918 @ 1125	DH.4 (A7798)	Albatros D.V	Out of control	Carvin	Observer: Sergeant M. B. Kilroy.
2	10 March 1918 @ 1215	DH.4 (A7770)	Albatros D.V	Out of control	Carvin—Fromelles	Observer: Sergeant M. B. Kilroy.
3	15 March 1918 @ 1245	DH.4 (A8076)	Pfalz D.III	Out of control	Avelin	Observer: Lieutenant J. M. Brisbane.
4	12 April 1918 @ 1025	D.H.4	Pfalz D.III	Destroyed in flames	Estaires	Observer: Second Lieutenant J. Waugh. Shared with Lieutenant F. J. Morgan & Sergeant M. B. Kilroy, Second Lieutenant Herbert Gould & Captain M. S. E. Archibald and Lieutenant Alfred Atkey & Sergeant H. Hammond.
5	12 April 1918 @ 1025	D.H.4	Pfalz D.III	Out of control	Estaires	Observer: Second Lieutenant J. Waugh. Shared with Lieutenant F. J. Morgan & Sergeant M. B. Kilroy, Second Lieutenant Herbert Gould & Captain M. S. E. Archibald and Lieutenant Alfred Atkey & Sergeant H. Hammond.
6	14 May 1918 @ 1800	DH.4 (A8000)	Fokker D.VII	Destroyed	Merville	Observer: Captain F. T. R. Kempster.
7	16 May 1918 @ 1350	DH.4 (A8041)	Fokker Dr.I	Out of control	Neuf-Berquin	Observer: Captain F. T. R. Kempster.
8	19 May 1918 @ 1200	DH.4	Albatros D.V	Out of control	Douai	Observer: Second Lieutenant Ayres. Shared with Second Lieutenants A. Green & F. Loly and Second Lieutenant G. Darville & Lieutenant E. Collis.
9	25 May 1918 @ 1130	DH.4	Albatros D.V	Out of control	Courrières	Observer: Second Lieutenant Ayres.
10	30 May 1918 @ 2030–2050	D.H.4 (A8018)	Fokker D.VII	Destroyed in flames	Bac Saint-Maur	Observer: Second Lieutenant Basil Blackett.
11	30 May 1918 @ 2030–2050	D.H.4 (A8018)	Fokker D.VII	Out of control	Bac Saint-Maur	Observer: Second Lieutenant Basil Blackett.

== World War II ==
Waller returned to service in the Administrative and Special Duties Branch of the Royal Air Force Volunteer Reserve during World War II. He was commissioned as a pilot officer (on probation) on 12 December 1940, being confirmed in his appointment and promoted to the war substantive rank of flying officer on 12 December 1941. Waller eventually relinquished his commission on account of ill-health on 8 November 1943, retaining the honorary rank of flight lieutenant.

== Personal life ==
In 1920 Waller married Marjorie Harrison in Cirencester, Gloucestershire. They had four children.
