= Percy Saunders =

English footballer

Personal information
- Full name: Percival Kitchener Saunders
- Date of birth: 9 July 1916
- Place of birth: Newhaven, England
- Date of death: 2–3 March 1942 (aged 25)
- Place of death: SS Rooseboom, Indian Ocean
- Position: Inside forward

Senior career*
| Years | Team | Apps | (Gls) |
| –1936 | Newhaven | | |
| 1936–1939 | Sunderland | 20 | (6) |
| 1939 | Brentford | 0 | (0) |
- * Club domestic league appearances and goals

Percival Kitchener Saunders (9 July 1916 – 2–3 March 1942) was an English professional footballer who played in the Football League for Sunderland and Brentford as an inside forward.

== Personal life ==
Saunders was a sergeant in the 18th Divisional Workshops, Royal Army Ordnance Corps, during the Second World War. He served in the Far East and in late February 1942, shortly before the Japanese occupation of the Dutch East Indies, he was evacuated from Emmahaven on the SS Rooseboom. The ship was headed for Bombay when it was torpedoed in the Indian Ocean on the night of 2–3 March 1942. Saunders was killed and his name is listed on the Kranji War Memorial. Saunders was the only former member of the Brentford and Sunderland squads to lose his life during the war. In December 2014, Saunders and other Sunderland players who lost their lives during the two world wars were commemorated with a statue outside the Stadium of Light.

== Career statistics ==
Appearances and goals by club, season and competition
| Club | Season | League | | | FA Cup | | Other | | Total | |
| Club | Season | Division | Apps | Goals | Apps | Goals | Apps | Goals | Apps | Goals |
|---|---|---|---|---|---|---|---|---|---|---|
| Sunderland | 1937–38 | First Division | 15 | 6 | 0 | 0 | — | | 15 | 6 |
| Sunderland | 1938–39 | First Division | 5 | 0 | 0 | 0 | 1 (Note: Appearance in Durham Senior Cup) | 1 | 6 | 1 |
| Career total | | | 20 | 6 | 0 | 0 | 1 | 1 | 21 | 7 |

== See also ==
- List of footballers killed during World War II
