= Archibald Paris =

British Army officer (1890–1942)

Brigadier Archibald Paris MC
- Born: Archibald Charles Melvill Paris; 28 May 1890; Portsea Island, Portsmouth, England
- Died: 3 March 1942 (aged 51); Indian Ocean
- Relatives: Major General Sir Archibald Paris (father)
- Military career
- Allegiance: United Kingdom
- Branch: British Army
- Service years: 1909–1942
- Rank: Brigadier
- Service number: 6515
- Unit: Oxfordshire and Buckinghamshire Light Infantry
- Commands: 11th Indian Infantry Division; 12th Indian Infantry Brigade
- Conflicts: First World War; Second World War: Pacific War; Malayan campaign; Battle of Kampar; Battle of Slim River; Battle of Singapore; Sinking of the SS Rooseboom (DOW)
- Awards: Military Cross

Brigadier Archibald Charles Melvill Paris, MC (28 May 1890 – 3 March 1942) was a British Army officer.

Although he is better known for having died during the events that followed the sinking of the Dutch ship Rooseboom off Sumatra in 1942, he was also one of the few British commanders that put up a good fight against the Japanese during the Battle of Malaya and the subsequent fall of Singapore.

== Early life and career ==
Archibald Paris was born in 1890 in Southsea on Portsea Island, Portsmouth, the son of Major General Sir Archibald Paris, a Royal Marines officer who commanded the Royal Naval Division during the First World War, and of Lillian Jane (née Melvill), daughter of Gen. Henry Melvill CB and granddaughter of Rev. Canon Henry Melvill. He was descended from Capt. Philip Melvill on his mother's side.

Paris passed out of the Royal Military College, Sandhurst and was commissioned into the Oxfordshire and Buckinghamshire Light Infantry in September 1909. He married Ruth Norton. Promoted to lieutenant in August 1913 and captain in March 1916, he served in the First World War, being made a GSO3 in February 1915, and was awarded the Military Cross (MC) in June 1917.

== Battle of Malaya ==
In December 1941, Paris was in command of the 12th Indian Infantry Brigade, part of the Singapore Garrison. When the battle started in northern Malaya, Paris's 12th Brigade was sent to protect the retreat of the Indian 11th Infantry Division, which it did successfully, to the extent that it surprised the Japanese, inflicting high casualties on some of their more overconfident units.

When Lieutenant General Arthur Percival sacked Major General David Murray-Lyon from command of the 11th Indian Division, Paris was given temporary command, until the disastrous Battle of Slim River, when Major General Billy Key took over and Paris resumed command of the 12th Brigade. Paris commanded the 12th Brigade throughout the retreat down Malaya and the subsequent battles on Singapore.

=== Rooseboom ===
With Singapore about to surrender in February 1942, Percival attempted to save personnel who were successful at fighting the Japanese and Paris was one of the chosen. His wife had left Singapore a few weeks earlier aboard the SS Lyemoon which was part of a civilian evacuation. He escaped aboard the Dutch ship Rooseboom, which was sunk off Sumatra. Although he survived the sinking along with about 80 other passengers in one lifeboat, he did not survive the shocking 28-day ordeal of drifting 1000 miles. There were only five survivors.

This account of the struggle for survival after the sinking of the Rooseboom was based on survivor and Argyll and Sutherland Highlander Walter Gibson's book The Boat:

On the third night out from Padang a torpedo struck the Rooseboom, which very soon capsized and sank, taking most of her 500 passengers with her and leaving only one lifeboat seaworthy. This boat, designed to hold 28, was now occupied by 80 of the 135 who had survived the sinking. The remainder clung to lifelines and floating debris.

The senior surviving soldier, Brigadier Paris, took charge of discipline in the boat, while informing the survivors that the Dutch captain of the Rooseboom, who had also survived, was in overall command. The best of discipline was futile in the face of the privations that now ensued. Men and women went mad with thirst. Many threw themselves overboard rather than face further suffering.
In Gibson’s account, a gang of renegade soldiers positioned themselves in the bows and at night systematically pushed the weaker survivors overboard to make the meager rations go further, until attacked by the others and flung overboard themselves. Brigadier Paris died, hallucinating before he fell into his final coma. The Dutch captain was killed by one of his own engineers.

The numbers of the living dwindled rapidly. By the time the lifeboat fetched up on Sipora, a coral island off Sumatra (a mere 100 miles from their starting point of Padang), only Gibson, a Chinese girl, Doris Lin, with whom he had developed a bond during those terrible weeks, and three Javans remained. One of the latter drowned in the surf as they tried to get ashore. The remaining Javans disappeared. After a period being tended by natives Gibson and Doris Lin were found by patrolling Japanese. He was returned to Padang as a PoW. He later learned that she had been shot as a spy by the Japanese.

Paris is commemorated on the Kranji War Memorial in Singapore.

== Bibliography ==
- Colin Smith (2005). Singapore Burning. Penguin. ISBN 978-0-670-91341-1.
