= Ceylon Planters' Rifle Corps =

British Ceylon military unit

Ceylon Planters Rifle Corps
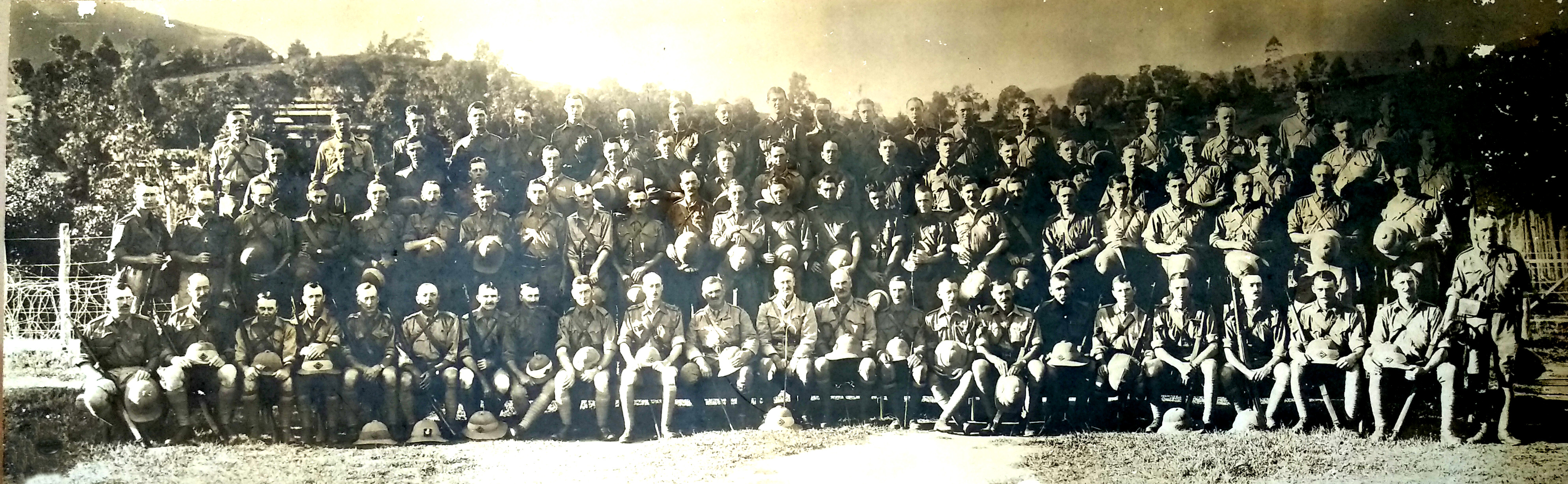
- Ceylon Planters' Rifle Corps around 1910
- Active: 1900–1949
- Country: British Ceylon
- Branch: Ceylon Defence Force
- Type: Militia
- Role: Infantry
- Part of: British Army
- Garrison/HQ: Kandy
- Nickname: CPRC
- Motto: Unitas Sales Nostra
- Engagements: Second Boer War; First World War; Second World War

The Ceylon Planters Rifle Corps was a regiment of the Ceylon Defence Force, which existed between 1900 and 1949. It was a volunteer (reserve) regiment based in Kandy, made up of only Europeans that were tea and rubber planters of the hills of Sri Lanka. The regiment deployed personnel to fight in the Second Boer War, the First, and Second World Wars.

== History ==
After the disbandment of the Ceylon Rifle Regiment (CRR) in 1873, some British planters and mercantile elite tried to form a volunteer infantry unit loosely known as the Matale Rifle Volunteer Corps but it was disbanded only months after its creation. In 1900, a new regiment named the Ceylon Planters Rifle Corps was established with its headquarters at Kandy; the officers and other ranks were made up of Europeans, who were tea and rubber planters in the central highlands of Ceylon. Its first commanding officer was Colonel R.N. Farquharson, a retired naval captain. The regiment was a volunteer regiment mobilized to respond to internal emergencies or for deployments overseas.

The regiment's first deployment took place on 1 February 1900 when a detachment was sent to South Africa under the command of Major Murray-Menzies during the Second Boer War, seeing action in Cape Colony as well as at Drifontein, Johannesberg, Diamond Hill and Wittebergen, and earning the Queen's and the King's Medals with seven clasps. During the conflict, the detachment lost one officer (Lieutenant A.H. Thomas, killed in action) and seven other ranks. A second detachment was sent to South Africa in 1902 arriving just before hostilities ended, and did not see combat. The overall conduct of Ceylon troops received accolades from General Kitchener, Chief of Staff to Lord Roberts in South Africa, who affirmed, "The Ceylon Contingent did very good work in South Africa I only wish we had more of them."

During the First World War, the regiment sent a force of eight officers and 229 other ranks under the command of Major J. Hall Brown. The unit sailed for Egypt in October 1914, and was initially deployed in defence of the Suez Canal. The unit was later transferred to the Australian and New Zealand Army Corps (ANZAC) and in mid-1915 was committed to the Gallipoli Campaign, landing at Anzac Cove ('Z' Beach) on the Gallipoli Peninsula. The CPRC also performed operational duties as providing guards to ANZAC headquarter staff, including the General Officer Commanding ANZAC, Lieutenant General William Birdwood, who remarked, "I have an excellent guard of Ceylon Planters who are such a nice lot of fellows." According to its onetime commanding officer, Colonel T.Y. Wright (1904–1912), the CPRC sustained overall losses of 80 killed and 99 wounded in the First World War.

The CPRC was mobilized once more when World War II began in 1939. Although primarily deployed for home defence in Ceylon the CPRC was a source for officer reinforcements, providing an estimated 700 volunteers who were commissioned as officers in the British Army and British Indian Army. Between August 1940 and July 1942, the CPRC dispatched six contingents amounting to 172 soldiers as officer reinforcements to the Officer Training School at Belgaum, India.

When Ceylon gained independence from Britain the Ceylon Planters Rifle Corps was disbanded on 11 April 1949 along with the Ceylon Defence Force, which led to the formation of the Ceylon Army.

== Recent years ==
In 1984, at the behest of planters in the highlands, the Sri Lanka Rifle Corps – consisting of two battalions – was created, modelled on the Ceylon Planters Rifle Corps. The battalions were raised in Pallekele and Neuchatel Estate Neboda, drawing their personnel from the highlands and the surrounding plantations, and since then the Rifle Corps has been deployed both in the central highlands and other parts of Sri Lanka in response to the civil war.

== Honorary Colonels ==
- Prince Henry, Duke of Gloucester

== Notable members ==
- Colonel Thomas Yates Wright, MBE, VD - appointed member of the Legislative Council of Ceylon and the Senate of Ceylon and commanding officer of the Ceylon Planters' Rifle Corps
- Major John William Oldfield, CMG, CBE, MC, ED - appointed member of the State Council of Ceylon and the Parliament of Ceylon.
- Major Ronald McClintock, MC - British World War I flying ace
- Lieutenant Basil Blackett - British World War I flying ace
- Lieutenant-Colonel Thomas Douglas Sutherland DSO* OBE MC - British Army officer of the First and Second world wars.
- Colonel C. B. 'Bosun' Loudoun-Shand, VD - commanding officer of the Ceylon Planters' Rifle Corps
- Colonel George Bridges Stevens, CBE, VD - commanding officer of the Ceylon Planters' Rifle Corps
- Gerald Gardner - Author

== External links and sources ==
- Cap badge, collar badges, shoulder titles, large and small button
- Sri Lanka Army
- Sri Lanka Rifle Corps
- Ceylon Defence Force
- regiments.org
