= Ceylon Defence Force =

- Active: 1881 – 11 April 1949
- Disbanded: 11 April 1949
- Country: British Ceylon (1881–1948); Dominion of Ceylon (1948–1949)
- Type: Army
- Engagements: Second Boer War; First World War; Second World War

The Ceylon Defence Force (CDF) was established in 1910 by the Ceylonese legislation Ceylon Defence Force Ordinance, which reformed the Ceylon Volunteer Force (CVF) that existed previously as the military reserve in the British Crown colony of Ceylon. At the time of forming it was only a reserve force but soon developed into a regular force responsible for the defence of Ceylon. The CDF was under the command of the General Officer Commanding, Ceylon of the British Army in Ceylon if mobilised. However mobilisation could be carried out only under orders from the Governor.

== History ==
The origins of the Ceylon Defence Force can be traced back to the formation of the Ceylon Volunteers in 1881, whereby the Citizens' Rifle Society rifle section was designated the 1st Battalion Ceylon Light Infantry with Lieutenant Colonel John Scott Armtage appointed as the first Commanding Officer. The Ceylon Volunteers subsequently were renamed the Ceylon Volunteer Force and finally was renamed the Ceylon Defence Force in 1910. Units of the Ceylon Volunteer Force in 1910.

- Ceylon Artillery Volunteers (CAV)
- Ceylon Light Infantry (CLI)
- Ceylon Mounted Infantry (CMI)
- Ceylon Planters Rifle Corps (CPRC)
- Ceylon Volunteer Medical Corps (CVMC)
- Ceylon Engineers (CE)
- Cadet Battalion Ceylon Light Infantry

=== Second Boer War ===
In 1900 Ceylon Mounted Infantry saw action and in 1902 a contingent of Ceylon Planters Rifle Corps, took part in the Second Boer War in South Africa. Their services were recognised by presentation, in 1902, of a colour to the Ceylon Mounted Infantry, and a presentation in 1904, of a Banner to the Ceylon Planters Rifle Corps.

Although there were Ceylonese officers much of the officer corps was made up of British officers and the other ranks were mostly Ceylonese with the exception of the Ceylon Planters Rifle Corps which was completely made up of Europeans.

=== First World War ===
In 1914, with the outbreak of the First World War, the Ceylon Defence Force was mobilised and expanded. Many volunteers from the Defence Force traveled to England and joined the British Army, and many of them were killed in action. One of them mentioned by Arthur Conan Doyle was Private Jacotine of the Ceylon Light Infantry, who was the last man left alive in his unit at the Battle of Lys, and who continued to fight for 20 minutes before he was killed. The CPRC sent a force of 8 officers and 229 other ranks commanded by Major J. Hall Brown to the Great War. The unit sailed for Egypt in October 1914, and was deployed in defence of the Suez Canal. This unit was officially attached to the Australian and New Zealand Army Corps (ANZAC) and was in 1915 dispatched to Anzac Cove (‘Z’ Beach) on the Gallipoli Peninsula. The CPRC performed operational duties as guards to ANZAC headquarter staff, including the General Officer Commanding ANZAC, Lieutenant General William Birdwood, who remarked, “I have an excellent guard of Ceylon Planters who are such a nice lot of fellows.” According to its onetime Commanding Officer (CO), Colonel T.Y. Wright (1904–1912), the Ceylon Planters Rifle Corps had sustained overall losses of 80 killed and 99 wounded in the Great War. Soon after the war the 80th Carnatics, who were the last regular military unit stationed in Ceylon on garrison duties, left. This resulted in the Ceylon Defence Force becoming a regular military unit with some units, such as the Mobilized Detachment of Ceylon Light Infantry Volunteers having troops mobilised on a permanent basis.

=== Second World War ===
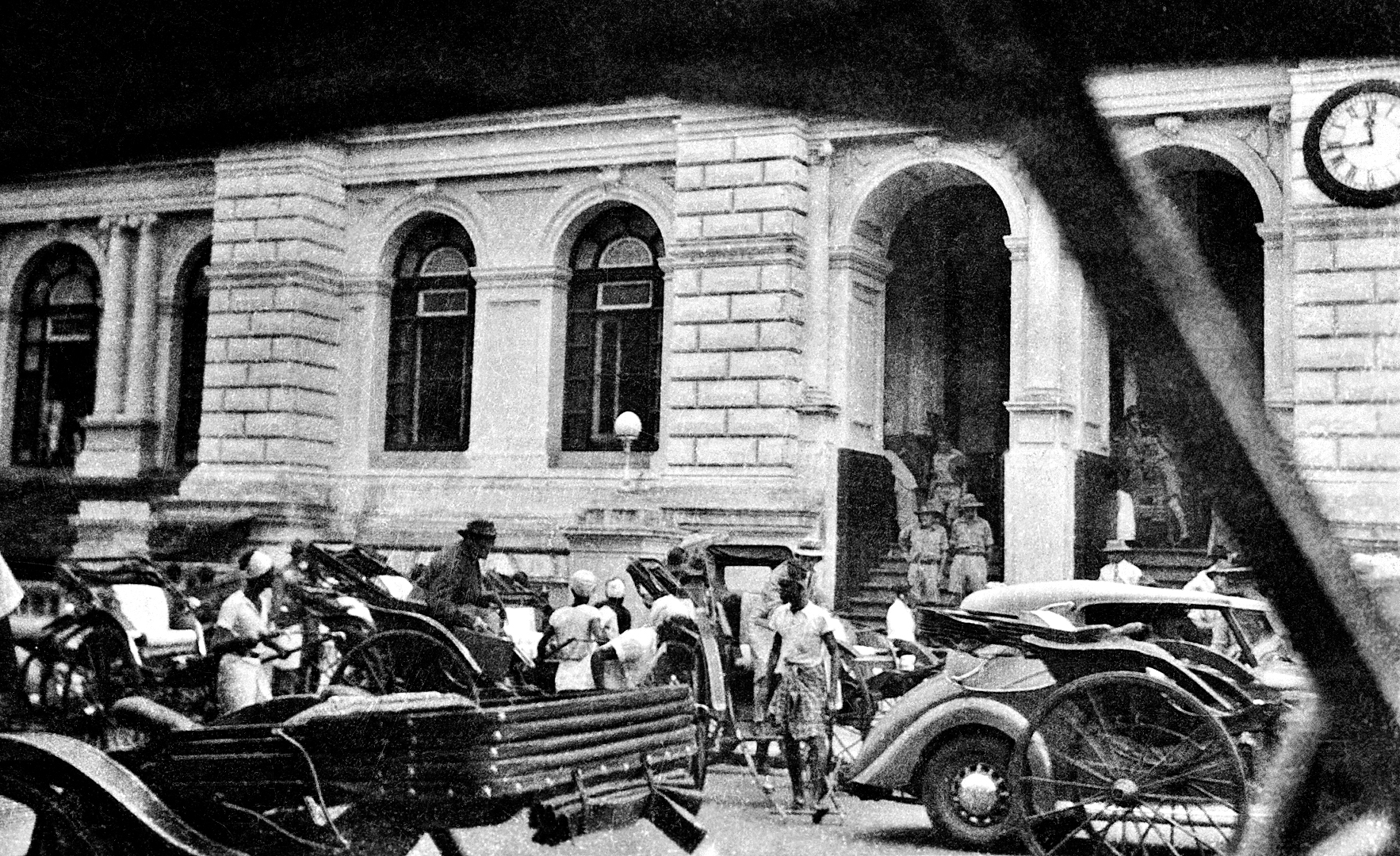
British Army Headquarters in Colombo, October 1940.

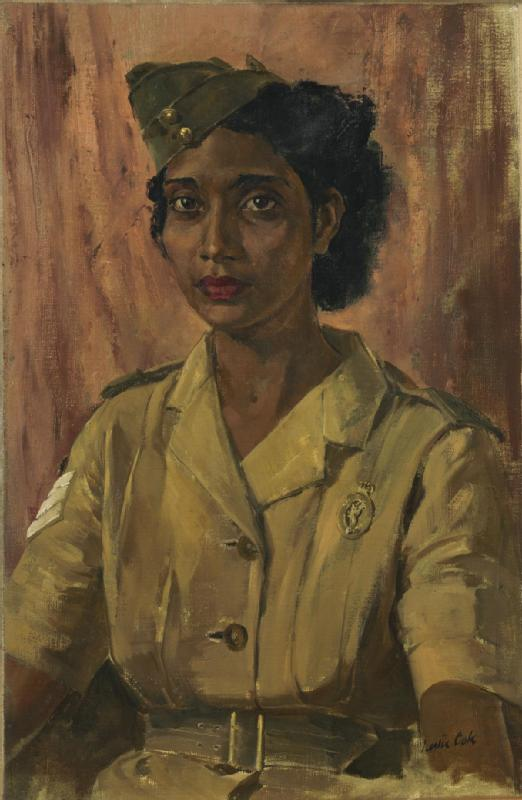
Sergeant Van Omoheusen of the Auxiliary Territorial Service, Ceylon.

In 1939, when the Second World War began, the Ceylon Defence Force was mobilised and expanded to fortify Ceylon to meet a possible threat posed by the Japanese. CDF came direct command of the South East Asia Command (SEAC) and formed part of the British 11th Army Group. It was sometimes referred to as the British Army in Ceylon or Ceylon Army Command during this time. South East Asia Command under Admiral Lord Louis Mountbatten had its headquarters located at Kandy, Ceylon.

Troops from the Ceylon Defence Force, mainly the Ceylon Light Infantry and the Ceylon Garrison Artillery were placed outside Ceylon undertaking garrison duties on the Seychelles and the Cocos Islands. In Cocos Islands Mutiny took place (encouraged by Trotskyist Lanka Sama Samaja Party) by a few members of the Ceylon Garrison Artillery but was immediately put down by the Ceylon Light Infantry. CLI troops in 1941 escorted Italian POWs from the Middle East to Ceylon, and later in 1946 Japanese POWs from Ceylon to India.

In 1945 reached its wartime peak at 645 officers and 14,247 other ranks. At the centre of the expansion was the Ceylon Light Infantry which grew by 1946 from one to five battalions.

=== Post war ===
On the 4th June 1947, 75 officers and 811 other ranks of CDF were again mobilised in its last major internal security operation to suppress a left wing hartal, or mass stoppage of work. The Ceylon Defence Force was given additional support by an armed detachment of British Royal Marines from HMS Glasgow, who were utilised to deter strikers in Colombo.

The following units with their officers were mobilised on the night of the 4th June 1947

The Ceylon Defence Force was officially disbanded on 11 April 1949 and reconstituted by Army Act No. 17 of 1949 which revoked the Ceylon Defence Force Ordinance of 1910 as the Ceylon Volunteer Force (CVF), itself becoming the Sri Lanka Army Volunteer Force (SLAVF) in 1972.

== Impact on the Ceylon Army ==
Soldiers who had experience in the CDF were actively recruited into the newly constructed regular force, and reconstituted volunteer force of the new Ceylon Army. In its first few years, and with few exceptions, the only new recruits enlisted were officer cadets and soldiers below the rank of warrant officer. Ceylon Defence Force veterans featured prominently in the post-independence regular Ceylon Army until General D. S. Attygalle (1967–1977) finished his term as Commander. The last Ceylon Defence Force veteran to leave the Army was Brigadier T. S. B. Sally, who ended his service tenure in 1979.

== Units of the Ceylon Defence Force ==
- Ceylon Light Infantry (CLI) (1881–Present)
  - Mobilised Detachment of Ceylon Light Infantry (Mob. Det., CLI) (1917–1939)
- Ceylon Garrison Artillery (CGA) (1889–Present)
- Ceylon Planters Rifle Corps (CPRC) (1887–1949)
- Ceylon Cadet Battalion (CCB) (1902–Present)
- Ceylon Mounted Rifles (CMR) (1906–1938)
- Ceylon Engineers (CE) (1911–Present)
- Ceylon Medical Corps (CMC) (1911–Present)
- Colombo Town Guard (CTG) (1914–1918, 1939–1945)
- Town Guard Artillery (TGA) (1914–1939)
- Ceylon Motor Cyclist Corps (CMCC) (1915–N/A)
- Ceylon Supply & Transport Corps (CSTC) (1918–1949)
- Ceylon Signal Corps (CSC) (1943–Present)
- Auxiliary Territorial Service (Ceylon) (ATS (Ceylon)) (1943–1946)
- Royal Military Police (Ceylon) (1944–1949)

== Personnel ==
Its commissioned officers received their commission from the Governor, instead of the British Monarch which was the case in the British Army. Since the force was a volunteer force, its personnel were made up of exclusively of the upper and middle class of the island who could spare the free time. Much of the officer carder was made up of Europeans, Burghers and a smaller extent from the Sinhalese, Tamils and Moor communities. A few Europeans had served with the British Army, vast majority were planters, landowners and professionals such as lawyers, doctors engineers and civil servants. Oxbridge graduates could easily gain a commission. Officer training was limited with, much of the training and activity were planned on weekends and at the annual training camp and exercise that took place in Diyatalawa. Infantry companies were formed in cities and towns with local volunteers.

=== Recruitment ===
Recruitment took place at regiment and unit level, with the commanding officer of the regiment deciding on both the officer and other ranks recruited into their respective units, following an application and an interview by a recruitment board. This meant that regiments retained exclusiveness such as the Ceylon Mounted Rifles and the Ceylon Planters Rifle Corps which was limited to Europeans and not opened to native Ceylonese.

=== Training ===
As volunteer units, the CDF personal served in a part-time basis. They would carryout drills and practice during a weekend per month and would undertake a training camp of two week duration once a year at Imperial Camp in the Diyatalawa Garrison.

== Notable members ==
- The Rt. Hon. Don Stephen Senanayake, CTG - First Prime Minister of Ceylon.
- General Sir John Lionel Kotelawala CH, KBE, CLI - Third Prime Minister of Ceylon
- Captain Henry Pedris, CTG - A prominent figure executed by the British.
- Major Hon. E. A. Nugawela, CLI - former Minister of Education (of the first cabinet 1948), Member of Parliament & State Council
- Major General Anton Muttukumaru OBE, ED, CLI - First Ceylonese Commander of the Ceylon Army (1955–1959)
- Major General H. W. G. Wijeyekoon, OBE, ED, CLI - Former Commander of the Ceylon Army (1960–1963)
- Major General Richard Udugama, MBE, CLI - Former Commander of the Ceylon Army (1964–1966)
- Major General B.R. Heyn, CLI - Former Commander of the Ceylon Army (1966–1967)
- General D. S. Attygalle MVO, CLI - Former Commander of the Sri Lankan Army (1967–1977)
- Lieutenant Basil Arthur Horsfall, VC, ELR - only Ceylonese to win a Victoria Cross
- Brigadier Douglas Ramanayake - first commanding officer, Sri Lanka Engineers
- Brigadier T. S. B. Sally - Former Chief of Staff, Sri Lanka Army
- Colonel Fredrick C. de Saram, OBE, CA - first commanding officer, Sri Lanka Artillery and the leader of the Attempted military coup in 1962
- Bombardier Gratien Fernando, CGA - leader of the Cocos Islands Mutiny

== Former decorations & medals ==
From its formation the Ceylon Defence Force used British military decorations.

- Ceylon Medal 1818
- Ceylon Overseas Volunteer Service Oval Medallion
- First World War Ceylon Commemorative Medal
- Army Long Service and Good Conduct Medal
- Meritorious Service Medal
- Colonial Auxiliary Forces Officers' Decoration
- Colonial Auxiliary Forces Long Service Medal
- Volunteer Officers' Decoration
- Efficiency Decoration (Ceylon)
- Efficiency Medal (Ceylon)

== See also ==
- Sri Lanka Army
- Ceylon in World War II
- Ceylon Royal Naval Volunteer Reserve
