= Chief Secretary of Ceylon =

Government post in British colony (1798–1946)

- Member of: the Executive Council
- Residence: Temple Trees
- Seat: The Secretariat
- Appointer: Governor of British Ceylon
- Precursor: Colonial Secretary of Ceylon
- Formation: 12 October 1798
- First holder: Hugh Cleghorn
- Final holder: Robert Drayton
- Abolished: 1946
- Succession: Prime Minister of Ceylon
- Deputy: Deputy Chief Secretary

The chief secretary of Ceylon, was the chairman and one of three officers of state of the Board of Ministers of the State Council of Ceylon from 1932 to 1947. The post succeeded that of Colonial Secretary which was one of six offices that held a seat in the Executive Council of Ceylon until 1932.

The established under in 1932 by the Order in Council, following the recommendations of the Donoughmore Commission, vested the subjects of external affairs, defence and the public services of the Crown Colony of Ceylon under the chief secretary, who served as the officer administering the government in the abases of the governor. As such, the chief secretary was third in the order of precedence after the governor of Ceylon and the chief justice.

The chief secretary was assisted by a deputy chief secretary and two assistant chief secretaries. Appointments were made from senior officers of the Colonial Service. The post ceased to exist in 1947 with the formation of the Dominion of Ceylon. the chief secretary's office was located in the Secretariat and the Temple Trees was the official residence of the chief secretary. The post was replaced by the post of prime minister in 1947 under the recommendations of the Soulbury Commission under the Ceylon Independence Act, 1947 and The Ceylon (Constitution and Independence) Orders in Council 1947.

== Departments ==
Departments under the chief secretary's office:

- Secretariat
- Ceylon Civil Service
- Ceylon Clerical Service
- Ceylon Defence Force
- Ceylon Naval Volunteer Force
- Coasts Lights
- Censor's Department
- Information Officer's Department

== List of secretaries ==
Data based on:

- John Ferguson, Ceylon in the "jubilee Year"., J. Haddon and Co.,1887
- Ceylon: Its History, People, Commerce, Industries and Resources, Plâté limited, 1924

| # | Colonial Secretary | Took office | Left office | Appointed by |
|---|---|---|---|---|
Colonial Secretary of Ceylon (1798–1932)
| 1 | Hugh Cleghorn | 12 October 1798 | January 1800 | Frederick North |
| - | William Boyd | January 1800 | September 1801 | Frederick North |
| 2 | Robert Arbuthnot | 10 September 1801 | 1806 | Frederick North |
| 3 | John Rodney | 3 September 1806 | 1833 | Thomas Maitland |
| 4 | Philip Anstruther | 1 May 1833 | 1845 | Robert Wilmot-Horton |
| 5 | James Emerson Tennent | 29 November 1845 | 1851 | Colin Campbell |
| 6 | Charles Justin MacCarthy | 2 January 1851 | 1860 | George Byng |
| 7 | William Charles Gibson | 10 August 1860 | 1869 | Charles Edmund Wilkinson |
| 8 | Henry Turner Irving | 4 June 1869 | 1873 | Hercules Robinson |
| 10 | Arthur Birch | 3 June 1873 | 1878 | William Henry Gregory |
| 11 | John Douglas | 18 August 1878 | 1885 | James Robert Longden |
| 12 | Cecil Clementi Smith | 17 November 1885 | 1887 | Arthur Hamilton-Gordon |
| 13 | Edward Noël Walker | 10 November 1887 | 1901 | Arthur Hamilton-Gordon |
| 14 | Everard im Thurn | 18 June 1901 | 1904 | Joseph West Ridgeway |
| 15 | Alexander Murray Ashmore | 10 September 1904 | 7 December 1906 | Henry Arthur Blake |
| | Hugh Clifford | 3 May 1907 | | Henry Arthur Blake |
| - | Leonard William Booth | 30 June 1911 | 17 October 1913 | Henry McCallum |
| | Edward Stubbs | 1913 | 1919 | Reginald Edward Stubbs |
| | Graeme Thomson | 1919 | 1922 | William Manning |
| | Cecil Clementi | 1922 | 1925 | William Manning |
| | Murchison Fletcher | 1926 | 1929 | Hugh Clifford |
| | Bernard Henry Bourdillon | 1929 | 1932 | Herbert Stanley |
Chief Secretary of Ceylon (1932–1946)
| | Bernard Henry Bourdillon | 1932 | 1936 | Graeme Thomson |
| | Francis Graeme Tyrrell | 1936 | 1939 | Edward Stubbs |
| | Maxwell MacLagan Wedderburn | 1939 | 1940 | Andrew Caldecott |
| | Guy Stanley Wodeman | 1940 | 1942 | Andrew Caldecott |
| | Robert Drayton | 1942 | 1946 | Andrew Caldecott |

== See also ==
- Chief secretary (British Empire)
- Governors of British Ceylon
- General Officer Commanding, Ceylon
- Attorney General of Sri Lanka
- Auditor General of Sri Lanka
- Treasurer of Ceylon
- Legal Secretary of Ceylon
- Financial Secretary of Ceylon
