= General Officer Commanding, Ceylon =

Commander of the British Army in Ceylon until World War II

General Officer Commanding, Ceylon (also known as Commander of Troops or Officer Commanding His/Her Majesties Troops, Ceylon) was the designation of the General Officer appointed to command all British Army units stationed in the island of Ceylon during the British colonial administration of the island.

== History ==
The post entitled the holder a seat in the Executive Council of Ceylon and the Legislative Council of Ceylon, advised the Governor of Ceylon on military matters.

Apart from British Army units that were deployed for garrison duty in the island, the officer held command over the Ceylon Defence Force if mobilized. However mobilization could be carried out only under orders from the Governor.

Following independence in 1948, the command was split. With the creation of the Ceylon Army, it head had was referred to as the Commander of the Ceylon Army and the British troops in Ceylon came under the command of the Commander, Ceylon Garrison and UK troops in Ceylon until the withdrawal of British troops from the island.

== Official Residence ==
The GOC Ceylon was entitled to a Class A Quarters issued to government officers for the use of his official residence in Colombo, and had the General's House in Nuwara Eliya as a country house.

== List of General Officers Commanding, Ceylon ==
Portrait	Rank	Name	Appointment	Left office	Unit
	Major	Patrick Alexander Agnew	31 August 1795	1 March 1796	Madras European Regiment
	Major-General	James Stuart	1 March 1796	1 January 1797	78th Regiment of Foot
	Major-General	Welbore Ellis Doyle	1 January 1797	2 July 1797	14th Regiment of Foot
	Lieutenant-Colonel	Peter Bonnevaux	2 July 1797	12 July 1797	10th Madras Native Infantry
	Major-General	Pierre-Frédéric de Meuron	12 July 1797	12 October 1798	Regiment de Meuron
	Colonel	Josiah Champagné	14 March 1799	22 July 1799	80th Regiment of Foot
	Colonel	Hay MacDowall	22 July 1799	March 1804	78th Regiment of Foot
	Major-General	David Douglas Wemyss	March 1804	19 July 1805	18th Regiment of Foot
	Major-General	Thomas Maitland	19 July 1805	19 March 1811	62nd Regiment of Foot
	Major-General	John Wilson	19 March 1811	11 March 1812	5th Garrison Battalion
	General	Sir Robert Brownrigg	11 March 1812	1 February 1820	
	Major general	Edward Barnes	1820		47th (Lancashire) Regiment of Foot
	Major general	James Campbell	22 July 1822		94th Regiment of Foot
	Major general	Hudson Lowe	1826		50th Foot
	Major general	John Wilson	14 October 1831		28th Foot
	Major general	Robert Arbuthnot	1839		76th Regiment of Foot
	Lieutenant general	Colin Campbell	16 April 1841		78th (Highlanders) Regiment of Foot
	Major general	William Smelt	28 January 1847		103rd Regiment of Foot
	Major general	Philip Bainbrigge	23 May 1852		7th Regiment of Foot
	Major general	Thomas Reed	13 September 1854		12th Light Dragoons
	Major general	Henry Frederick Lockyer	1856	1860	97th (The Earl of Ulster's) Regiment of Foot
	Major general	Terence O'Brien	1860	1865	
	Major general	Studholme John Hodgson	1865	1869	54th Regiment of Foot
	Major general	Henry Renny	1869	1874	81st Regiment of Foot
	Major general	John Alfred Street	1874	1879	68th Regiment of Foot
	Major general	William Wilby	1879	1882	King's Own Royal Regiment
	Major general	John Chetham McLeod	1882	1887	42nd Regiment of Foot
	Major general	Wilbraham Lennox	1887	1888	Royal Engineers
	Major general	William Massy	1888	1893	19th Regiment of Foot
	Major general	William Clive-Justice	1893	1897	75th Regiment of Foot
	Major general	F. T. Hobson	1897	1902	
	Major general	Hector MacDonald	1902	1903	92nd Gordon Highlanders
	Brigadier general	G. L. C. Money	1903	1905	Queen's Own Cameron Highlanders
	Brigadier general	R .C. B. Lawrence	1905	1909	1st King's Dragoon Guards
	Brigadier general	A. J. Whitacre Allen	1909	1913	The Buffs
	Brigadier general	Henry Huntly Leith Malcolm	1913	1915	Queen's Own Cameron Highlanders
	Brigadier general	F. Hackett-Thompson	1915	1918	Queen's Own Cameron Highlanders
	Brigadier general	F. A. MacFarlane	1918	1920	
	Colonel commandant	Clifford Coffin	1920	1924	Royal Engineers
	Colonel commandant	Harold Higginson	1924	1927	Royal Dublin Fusiliers
	Brigadier	Austin Girdwood	1927	1931	Northumberland Fusiliers
	Brigadier	E. F. Shewell	1931	1934	Royal Artillery
	Brigadier	C. A. Lyon	1934	1937	Royal Artillery
	Brigadier (local rank)	J. O. Thurburn	1937	1941	Royal Artillery
	Major general	Tim Inskip	1941	1942	13th Frontier Force Rifles
	Lieutenant general	Henry Pownall	1942	1943	Royal Artillery
	Major general	Francis Tuker	March 1944	September 1944	Royal Sussex Regiment, 2nd Gurkha Rifles

== See also ==
- Commander of the Ceylon Defence Force
- Commander-in-Chief, Ceylon
