= Peter Bonnevaux =

Lieutenant-Colonel Peter Bonnevaux

4th Military Governor of British Ceylon
- In office 2 July 1797 – 12 July 1797
- Monarch: George III
- Preceded by: Welbore Ellis Doyle
- Succeeded by: Pierre Frédéric de Meuron

3rd General Officer Commanding, Ceylon
- In office 30 June 1797 – 1797
- Preceded by: Welbore Ellis Doyle
- Succeeded by: Pierre Frédéric de Meuron

Personal details
- Born: Pierre Daillé; 1741 Saumur, France
- Died: 12 July 1797 (aged 55–56) Colombo, British Ceylon

Military service
- Allegiance: Great Britain
- Branch/service: British Army
- Years of service: 1768–1797
- Rank: Lieutenant-Colonel
- Unit: 10th Madras Native Infantry
- Commands: Commandant, Kondapalli; Commandant, Galle; General Officer Commanding, Ceylon

Lieutenant-Colonel Peter Bonnevaux (born Pierre Daillé; 1741 – 12 July 1797) was the fourth Military Governor of British Ceylon and third General Officer Commanding, Ceylon. A French national, Bonnevaux was watchmaker at the Palace of Versailles before leaving for England to escape Protestant prosecution in 1765. Having joined the East India Company's Madras Army, Bonnevaux rose to the rank of lieutenant-colonel in the 10th Madras Native Infantry.

Fighting in the French Revolutionary Wars, Bonnevaux commanded an infantry brigade during the Invasion of Ceylon and afterwards stayed there as commandant of Galle. On 2 July 1797 he was appointed General Officer Commanding and Military Governor of Ceylon, but died ten days later when his curricle overturned as he was leaving Colombo.

== Early life ==
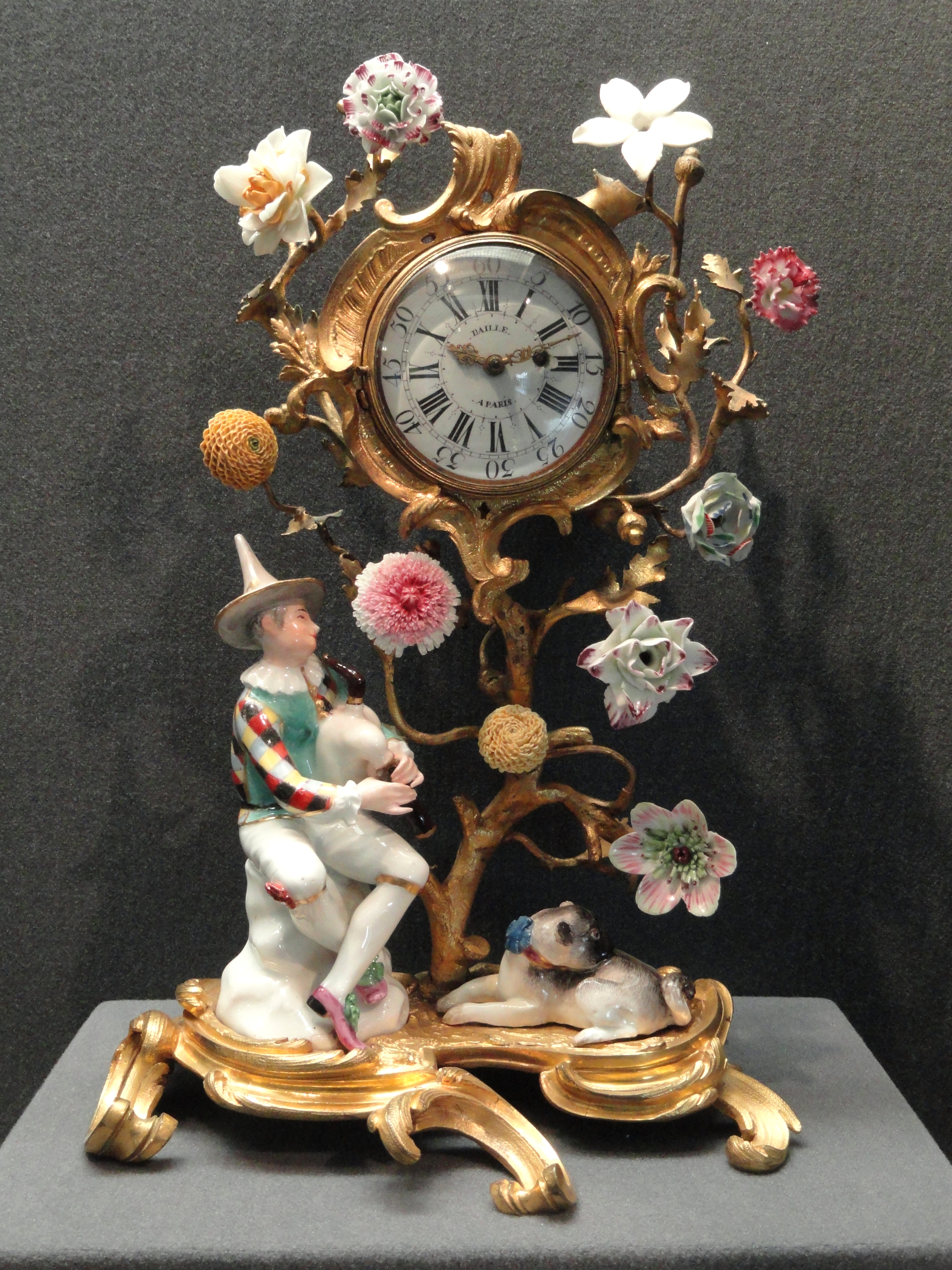
Clock made by Bonnevaux c.1765 with model by Johann Joachim Kändler

Peter Bonnevaux was born Pierre Daillé in Saumur, France, in 1741. His father was Daniel Daillé and his mother's name was Magdalen. Bonnevaux became the watchmaker to the royal court at the Palace of Versailles in 1764, but a year later escaped to England due to French persecution of Protestants.

== Military career ==
Bonnevaux joined the 10th Madras Native Infantry of the East India Company's Madras Army as an ensign on 15 June 1768, advancing to lieutenant on 3 August 1770. He was then promoted to captain on 9 July 1779 and major on 6 February 1788. Two years later Bonnevaux became commandant of Kondapalli Fort. He was promoted to lieutenant-colonel on 18 March 1794.

Bonnevaux was given command of the European Brigade for operations in the Invasion of Ceylon in February 1796. His force was made up of the 52nd, 73rd, and 77th Regiments of Foot. Bonnevaux commanded the brigade during the captures of Negombo and Colombo in the same month. He was appointed commandant of Galle in the following year, and then succeeded Major-General Welbore Ellis Doyle as General Officer Commanding, Ceylon and Military Governor of Ceylon on 2 July. His stint in command was brief, as on 12 July his curricle overturned as he drove out of Colombo, killing him.

== Citations ==
Government offices
Preceded by Welbore Ellis Doyle	Military Governor of British Ceylon; 1797-1797	Succeeded by Pierre Frédéric de Meuron
Military offices
Preceded by Welbore Ellis Doyle	General Officer Commanding, Ceylon; 1797-1797	Succeeded by Pierre Frédéric de Meuron
