= Guy Stanley Wodeman =

Guy Stanley Wodeman CMG

Chief Secretary of Ceylon
- In office 30 May 1940 – 7 April 1942
- Monarch: George VI
- Preceded by: Maxwell MacLagan Wedderburn
- Succeeded by: Robert Drayton

Lieutenant Governor of Ceylon
- In office 11 August 1938 – 22 October 1938
- Monarch: George VI
- Preceded by: Maxwell MacLagan Wedderburn

Personal details
- Born: Guy George Stanley Wodeman; 16 July 1886 Stockton, Durham
- Died: 5 May 1970 (aged 83) Hammersmith, London
- Citizenship: British
- Spouse(s): Phyllis Mary Carpenter (m.1915), Winifred Mary De Winton (m.1937)

Guy George Stanley Wodeman CMG (16 July 1886 – 5 May 1970) was a British civil servant, who served as the Chief Secretary of Ceylon between 1940 and 1942.

Guy George Stanley Wodeman was born 16 July 1886 in Stockton, Durham, England, the son of Henry Wodeman (1843 - 1932), rector of St. Peter's Church in Stockton, and Edith Charlotte Ellen née West (1850 - c.1916). He was the youngest of five boys, Henry Charles Thomas (b.1874), Bertram Howard (b.1875), Arthur Cleveland (b.1877) and Cyril Herbert (b.1881). He went to school at Rossall School, Fleetwood, Lancashire and graduated from Jesus College, Cambridge with a Master of Arts.

Wodeman joined the Ceylon Civil Service on 13 November 1909, where he was appointed as the assistant to the government agent in Sabaragamuwa in October 1910, the police magistrate in Matale in February 1912, the assistant commissioner of excise in April 1913, assistant government agent in Kandy in April 1915, assistant government agent in Matale in August 1915, assistant government agent in Trincomalee in April 1916, assistant government agent in Colombo in October 1918, assistant government agent in Nuwara Eliya in December 1919, assistant government agent in Kegalle in December 1921 and assistant government agent in Matara in March 1923.

He married Phyllis Mary Carpenter in 1915, after he death in 1937 he remarried Winifred Mary De Winton (1891-1967) on 2 April 1938 in Chelsea, London.

On 11 August 1938 he was appointed Lieutenant Governor of Ceylon, a position he held until 22 October. He then served as the deputy Chief Secretary of Ceylon.

In 1939 Wodeman was awarded the Companion of the Order of St Michael and St George in the King's Birthday Honours for his work in the Colonial Administrative Service.

On 3 February 1940 Wodeman was appointed as the acting Chief Secretary of Ceylon, taking over from Sir Maxwell MacLagan Wedderburn, and was permanently appointed in the role on 30 May that year. He remained as Chief Secretary until 7 April 1942, when he retired and was replaced by Sir Robert Drayton.

He died on 5 May 1970 in Hammersmith, London.
