= Legal Secretary of Ceylon =

- Member of: Board of Ministers of Ceylon
- Appointer: Governor of British Ceylon
- Formation: 1931
- First holder: Edward St John Jackson
- Final holder: Robert Drayton
- Abolished: 1947
- Succession: Minister of Justice

The Legal Secretary of Ceylon, was an officer of state of the British Colonial Administration of Ceylon from 1931 to 1947, appointed from the Colonial Legal Service. The Legal Secretary one of three officers of state of the Board of Ministers of the State Council of Ceylon, who serve as the legal advisor to the government; administration of justice; criminal prosecutions and civil proceeding on behalf of the crown; election to the State Council, drafting of legislature and the public trustee. The post was formed under recommendations of the Donoughmore Commission the post replaced the Attorney General as the chief legal advisor to the Governor, it was in turn replaced by the post of Minister of Justice in 1947 under the recommendations of the Soulbury Commission under the Ceylon Independence Act, 1947 and The Ceylon (Constitution and Independence) Orders in Council 1947.

== Departments ==
- Attorney General's Department
- The Fiscals
- The Public Trustee
- Legal Draftsman
- District Courts
- Courts of Requests
- Magistrate's courts
- Village Tribunals

== List of Legal Secretaries ==
- Edward St John Jackson (1932–1936) - Legal Secretary and Attorney General
- John Curtois Howard (1936–1940)
- Robert Harry Drayton (1940–1942)
- John Harry Barclay Nihill (1942–1946)

== See also ==
- Chief Secretary of Ceylon
- Financial Secretary of Ceylon
