= Pierre-Frédéric de Meuron =

Swiss army officer and colonial administrator (1746–1813)

Lieutenant-General Pierre-Frédéric de Meuron
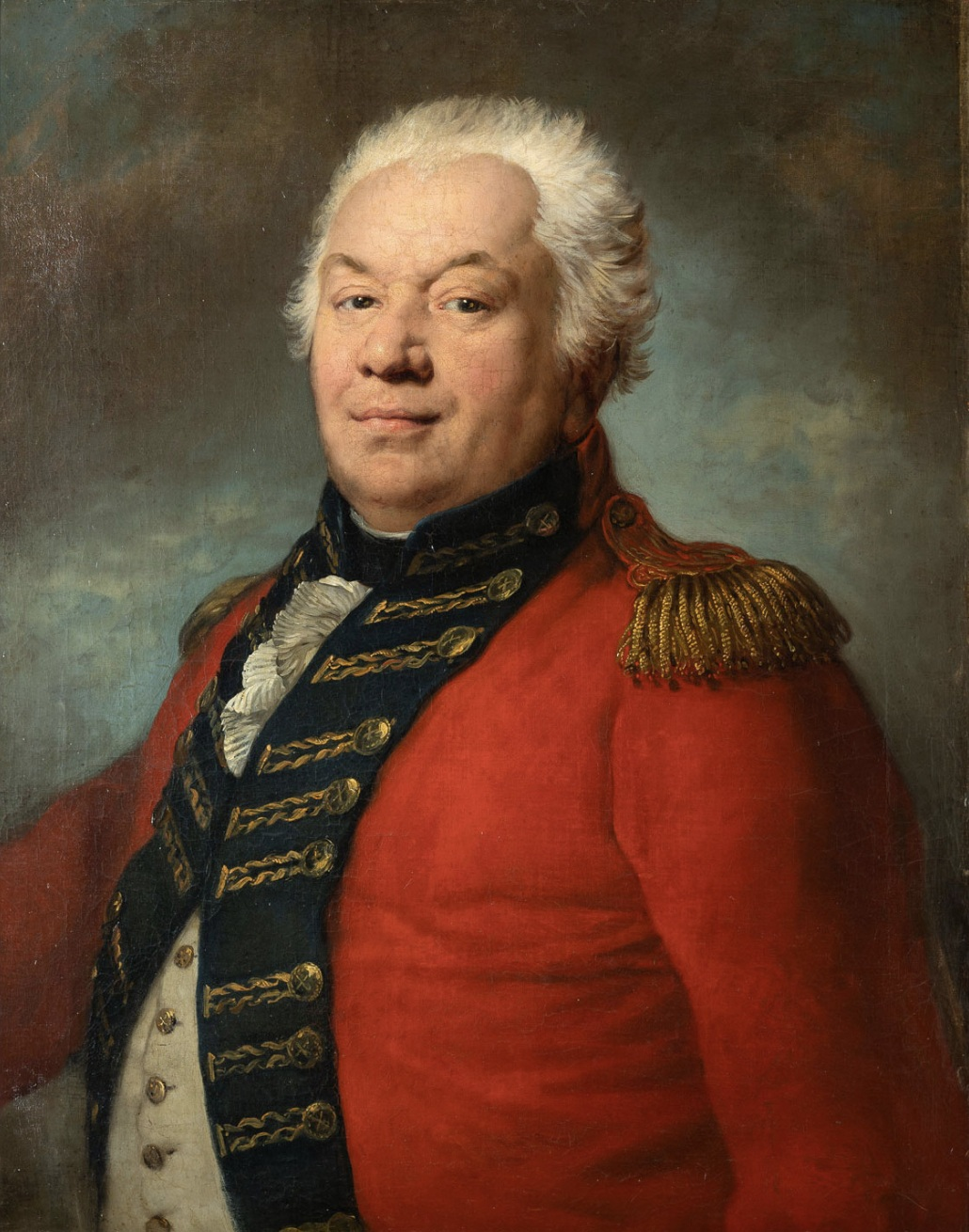
- Portrait by Anton Graff, 1805

5th Military Governor of British Ceylon
- In office 12 July 1797 – 12 October 1798
- Monarch: George III
- Preceded by: Peter Bonnevaux
- Succeeded by: Robert Andrews (as Resident and Superintendent of British Ceylon)

4th General Officer Commanding, Ceylon
- In office 12 July 1797 – ?
- Preceded by: Peter Bonnevaux
- Succeeded by: Josiah Champagne

Personal details
- Born: 17 April 1746 Saint-Sulpice, Principality of Neuchâtel
- Died: 30 March 1813 (aged 66) Neuchâtel, Principality of Neuchâtel

Military service
- Allegiance: Dutch Republic; Great Britain; United Kingdom
- Years of service: 1781–1812
- Rank: Lieutenant-General (British Army)
- Commands: General Officer Commanding, Ceylon; Regiment de Meuron

Pierre-Frédéric de Meuron (17 April 1746 – 30 March 1813) was a Swiss army officer and colonial administrator who served the fifth Military Governor of British Ceylon from 1797 to 1798, and fourth General Officer Commanding, Ceylon. He was also the commanding officer of the Regiment de Meuron, a unit of Swiss mercenaries that had served in Ceylon under the Dutch, but whose transfer of allegiance to Great Britain facilitated the fall of Columbo to the British on 15 October 1796.

== Biography ==
Meuron was born in Saint-Sulpice, Principality of Neuchâtel (now Canton of Neuchâtel, Switzerland). He was the son of Elisabeth Dubois de Dunilac and Théodore de Meuron, a merchant and militia captain. In 1781, he entered Dutch service as the recruiting officer for the Regiment de Meuron, a mercenary regiment founded by his brother, Charles-Daniel de Meuron. Meuron succeeded his brother as colonel of the regiment in 1786.

Meuron commanded the regiment in Ceylon, India, and the Mediterranean. He received the rank of brigadier general in 1795, after the regiment entered British service. He was appointed Military Governor of British Ceylon on 12 July 1797 and occupied this post until 12 October 1798. His successor was Robert Andrews, who served as Resident and Superintendent of British Ceylon. Meuron was promoted to major general in 1798 and to lieutenant general in 1805. He retired in 1812 and died in Neuchâtel on 30 March 1813.

Government offices
Preceded by Peter Bonnevaux	Military Governor of British Ceylon; 1797–1798	Succeeded by Robert Andrews (as Resident and Superintendent of British Ceylon)
Military offices
Preceded by Peter Bonnevaux	General Officer Commanding, Ceylon; 1797-?	Succeeded by Josiah Champagne
