= Hugh Cleghorn (colonial administrator) =

British Colonial Administrator

Sir Hugh Cleghorn FRSE LLD (1751-1836) was the first colonial secretary to Ceylon. He was key in the takeover of Ceylon from Dutch control to the British Empire. In 1795 Cleghorn used his friendship with Comte Charles-Daniel de Meuron, who owned a regiment of Swiss mercenaries, the Regiment de Meuron, that controlled Ceylon for the Dutch, to transfer control to the British. His grandson Hugh Francis Clarke Cleghorn was instrumental in the foundation of the forest department and forest conservation in India.

== Life ==
He was born in Fife around 1751. He attended the High School in Edinburgh 1762–3. He was Professor of Civil and Natural History at St Andrews University from 1773 to 1793. He took a long leave of absence from 1788 to 1790 and traveled with the young Alexander Home, 10th Earl of Home on an extended trip of Europe: France, Switzerland and Italy, lecturing at universities along the route. He was elected a Fellow of the Royal Society of Edinburgh in 1790. His proposers were John Playfair, Alexander Hamilton and James Hutton. In 1790, Cleghorn was a named recipient of £400 in the will and testament of Adam Smith, to be paid upon the death of Smith's cousin, Janet Douglas.

In 1795 Cleghorn traveled to India and Ceylon with Charles Daniel, the Comte de Meuron. The Regiment de Meuron withdrew its support of the Dutch and shortly thereafter, on 15 October 1796, the town and fortress of Columbo surrendered to the British. Cleghorn received £5000 for his role in arranging the Regiment's transfer of allegiance.

In 1798 Cleghorn was appointed Colonial Secretary of Ceylon. However, he did not get on with Governor Frederick North, the first British civilian governor of the island, who arrived on 12 October 1798. Cleghorn resigned his post and returned to Scotland.

Cleghorn had several properties, primarily Stravithie Castle, north of Dunino, a large townhouse, "St Leonards" in St Andrews and the estate of Pitreavie near Dunfermline. All are in Fife. He also had property at Wakefield in England.

In 1829 he was staying at Society in Edinburgh to have a bladder stone removed by Dr Bell.

He died in February 1836.

== Family ==
Cleghorn married Rachel some time around 1795.

Hugh's sons Patrick Cleghorn and John Cleghorn both spent much time in India.

A third son, Peter Cleghorn, was the father of Hugh Francis Clarke Cleghorn FRSE.

His daughter Jenny ("Jessie") Douglas Cleghorn married and lived in Edinburgh.
