= A. J. Whitacre Allen =

British Army general (1857–1939)

Brigadier-General A. J. Whitacre Allen CB
- Born: 7 November 1857; Kelston, Somerset, England
- Died: 1939 (aged 81–82); Maidstone, Kent
- Military career
- Branch: British Army
- Service years: 1876–1913, 1914–1916
- Rank: Brigadier-General
- Unit: The Buffs
- Commands: Officer Commanding the British Troops in Ceylon
- Conflicts: Anglo-Zulu War; Nile Expedition; Mohmand campaign of 1897–1898; Tirah campaign
- Awards: Companion of the Order of the Bath

Brigadier-General Alfred James Whitacre Allen CB (7 November 1857 – 1939) was a British Army officer.

== Military career ==
Born to Major John Whitacre Allen and Eliza Whiteside, he was educated at Winchester College.

He was commissioned into the 3rd Regiment of Foot on 12 February 1876. He served in the Anglo-Zulu War in 1879.

Promoted to captain in 1885, he served as Staff Captain in the Nile Expedition (1884-1885), passed staff college in 1886 and served as aide-de-camp to Major-General, Bengal, 1888-1890; Station Staff Officer, 1st Class, 1890-1892; Deputy Assistant Quarter Master General - Intelligence, Army Headquarters, India, 1892-1895. Promoted to major in 1895, he served in the Mohmand campaign of 1897–1898, where he was Deputy Assistant Adjutant and Quarter Master General on the Tirah campaign and thereafter was the Station Staff Officer, 1st Class, Punjab, 1898-1899; Deputy Assistant-Adjutant-General Punjab, 1899-1900. Promoted to Lieutenant-Colonel in 1901, he was breveted Colonel in 1904 and promoted to the substantive rank of Colonel on 22 February 1907; having served as Assistant-Adjutant-General, 1900-1903; Commandant Deolali Depot, 1903-1905; officiating Assistant-Quartermaster-General Western Command, Poona, 1905-1906. From 28 May 1909 to 1913, he served Officer Commanding the British Troops in Ceylon with the temporary rank of brigadier general and retired on 21 June 1913 in the honorary rank of Brigadier-General.

He was recalled to service during the First World War, which began in the summer of 1914, and was placed in command of the 74th Infantry Brigade, part of the 25th Division of Kitchener's Army, on 18 September 1914 and was granted the temporary rank of brigadier general while employed in this position. He served as the brigade's general officer commanding (GOC) until February 1916 when he was relieved before seeing action. For his services he was appointed a Companion of the Order of the Bath (CB) in the 1908 Birthday Honours, and awarded the Zulu War Medal with clasp, Egypt Medal with clasp, Khedive's Star, India Medal with two clasps and mentioned in dispatches.

In 1889 he married Mary Emily, daughter of Lieutenant-General Sir John Hudson.
