= Robert Andrews (civil servant) =

Resident and Superintendent of British Ceylon
- In office 12 February 1796 – 12 October 1798
- Monarch: George III
- Preceded by: Pierre Frédéric de Meuron (as Military Governor of British Ceylon)
- Succeeded by: Frederick North (as Governor of British Ceylon)

Robert Andrews (c. 1763 – 13 November 1821) was the Resident and Superintendent of British Ceylon. He was appointed on 12 February 1796 and was Resident until 12 October 1798. He was succeeded by Frederick North as Governor of British Ceylon.

Andrews was in the East India Company, in the Madras Civil Service, from 1778, and became Collector of Trinchinopoli. He was Senior Judge of Appeal, in the Madras Presidency.

Government offices
Preceded by Pierre Frédéric de Meuron (as Military Governor of British Ceylon)	Resident and Superintendent of British Ceylon; 1796–1798	Succeeded by Frederick North (as Governor of British Ceylon)
