= Prime Minister's Lodge =

- Interactive map of the Prime Minister's Lodge area
- Alternative names: Prime Minister's Cottage

General information
- Architectural style: British
- Location: 19/23 Grand Hotel Road, Nuwara Eliya, Sri Lanka
- Coordinates: 6.972214°N 80.761932°E
- Owner: Prime Minister's Office

Technical details
- Floor count: 2

Archaeological Protected Monument of Sri Lanka
- Designated: 23 February 2007

Prime Minister's Lodge (also known as the Prime Minister's Cottage) is a country house in Nuwara Eliya, Sri Lanka. It is the vacationing and country residence of the Prime Minister of Sri Lanka. Located within the limits of the Nuwara Eliya Municipal Council along the Queen Elizabeth Drive, close to the Queen's Cottage. The property is administered by the Prime Minister's Office, while the grounds and garden are maintained by the Department of National Botanical Gardens

On 23 February 2007 the building was formally recognised by the Government as an Archaeological Protected Monument.

== See also ==
- Queen's Cottage
- General's House, Nuwara Eliya
