= Welbore Ellis Doyle =

Major-General Welbore Ellis Doyle
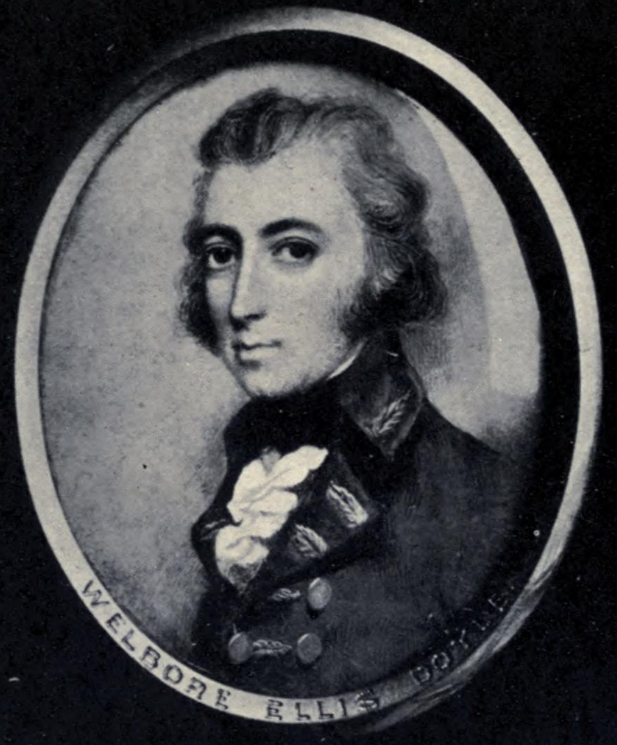

3rd Military Governor of British Ceylon
- In office 1 January 1797 – 2 July 1797
- Monarch: George III
- Preceded by: James Stuart
- Succeeded by: Peter Bonnevaux

2nd General Officer Commanding, Ceylon
- In office 1 January 1797 – 2 January 1798
- Preceded by: James Stuart
- Succeeded by: Peter Bonnevaux

Personal details
- Born: 1758
- Died: 30 June 1797 (aged 38–39)
- Resting place: Colombo, Sri Lanka
- Relations: Sir John Doyle, 1st Baronet (brother)
- Children: 3

Military service
- Allegiance: United Kingdom
- Branch/service: British Army
- Years of service: 1770–1798
- Rank: Major-General
- Commands: General Officer Commanding, Ceylon

Major-General Welbore Ellis Doyle (1758 – 2 January 1798) was a British soldier and administrator who served as the acting governor of Ceylon. He fought for the British in the American Revolutionary War and the War of the First Coalition.

== Early life ==
Welbore Ellis Doyle was born in 1758, to Charles Doyle. His older brother was Sir John Doyle, 1st Baronet.

== Career ==
=== American Revolution ===
On 12 December 1770, Doyle was appointed as an ensign in the 55th Regiment of Foot and was promoted to lieutenant on 17 February 1773. His regiment was sent to fight in the American Revolutionary War. He was promoted to captain-lieutenant on 5 November 1777.

Francis Rawdon-Hastings, 1st Marquess of Hastings formed the Volunteers of Ireland in 1778, and placed Doyle as lieutenant-colonel within it. Doyle led the Volunteers of Ireland at the Battle of Camden, where half of the unit was killed or wounded. Doyle destroyed General Francis Marion's base at Snow's Island and freed 26 prisoners in March 1781. Doyle was wounded twice during the war. Doyle remained on half-pay from the end of the war in 1783 until 1789.

=== War of the First Coalition ===
In 1789, Doyle became a colonel of the 14th Foot when it returned from Jamaica. The 14th Foot fought under the Prince Frederick, Duke of York and Albany during his campaign in Flanders in 1793. Doyle led the storming during the Siege of Valenciennes on 27 July 1793. Doyle was promoted to brevet-colonel after the siege.

Doyle returned to England in 1794, and was attached to Rawdon-Hastings as an adjutant-general, with the rank of brigadier-general. Their 10,000 strong force was sent to fight in the War in the Vendée, but arrived after the French victory at the Battle of Savenay. The force was instead sent to Ostend and then Flushing. It joined an offensive with François Sébastien Charles Joseph de Croix, Count of Clerfayt and pushed to the Scheldt.

Doyle was sent back to England, promoted to major general, and made governor of Southampton on 26 February 1795. Doyle organised an expedition to Quiberon to aid the Vendeans. It was initially meant to be led by Rawdon-Hastings, but Doyle was placed in command instead.

In 1796, Doyle was made a colonel of the 53rd (Shropshire) Regiment of Foot. In November, he was made command-in-chief and acting governor of Ceylon.

== Personal life ==
Doyle married Francis Rainsford, the great-granddaughter of Mark Rainsford, in 1774 and fathered two children with her. One of their children, Carlo Joseph Doyle, was named in honour of his godfather, Emperor Joseph II. It was rumoured that Rawdon-Hastings had an affair with Francis.

Doyle suffered from the environment of Ceylon and died on 2 January 1798. He was buried in Colombo. In his will, Doyle bequeathed all of his property to Rawdon-Hastings, who would take care of Francis and the two children. In 1802, Franis married Prince Joseph of Monaco..

== Works cited ==
=== Books ===
- Barnes, James; Barnes, Patience, eds. (2012). The American Revolution through British Eyes: A Documentary Collection. Kent State University Press. ISBN 9781612776415.
- Conrad, Dennis, ed. (1995). The Papers of General Nathanael Greene: Vol. VIII: 30 March-10 July 1781. Vol. 8. University of North Carolina Press. ISBN 0807822124.
- Doyle, Arthur (1911). A Hundred Years of Conflict: Being Some Records of the Services of Six Generals of the Doyle Family 1756-1856. Longman.
- Rainsford, Marcus (2013). An Historical Account of the Black Empire of Hayti. Duke University Press. ISBN 9780822395560.

=== Journals ===
- "The Volunteers of Ireland". The American Catholic Historical Researches. 3 (4). American Catholic Historical Society: 339–351. 1907. doi:10.2307/44374704. JSTOR 44374704.
- Ward, S. (1970). "1551. The St. George Diary, 1794-1795". Journal of the Society for Army Historical Research. 48 (194). Society for Army Historical Research: 122–124. doi:10.2307/44227009. JSTOR 44227009.

Government offices
Preceded by James Stuart	Military Governor of British Ceylon; 1797	Succeeded by Peter Bonnevaux
Military offices
Preceded by James Stuart	General Officer Commanding, Ceylon; 1797	Succeeded by Peter Bonnevaux
Preceded by Gerard Lake	Colonel of the 53rd (Shropshire) Regiment of Foot; 1796–1797	Succeeded by Charles Crosbie
