= Joseph Reinhart (artist) =

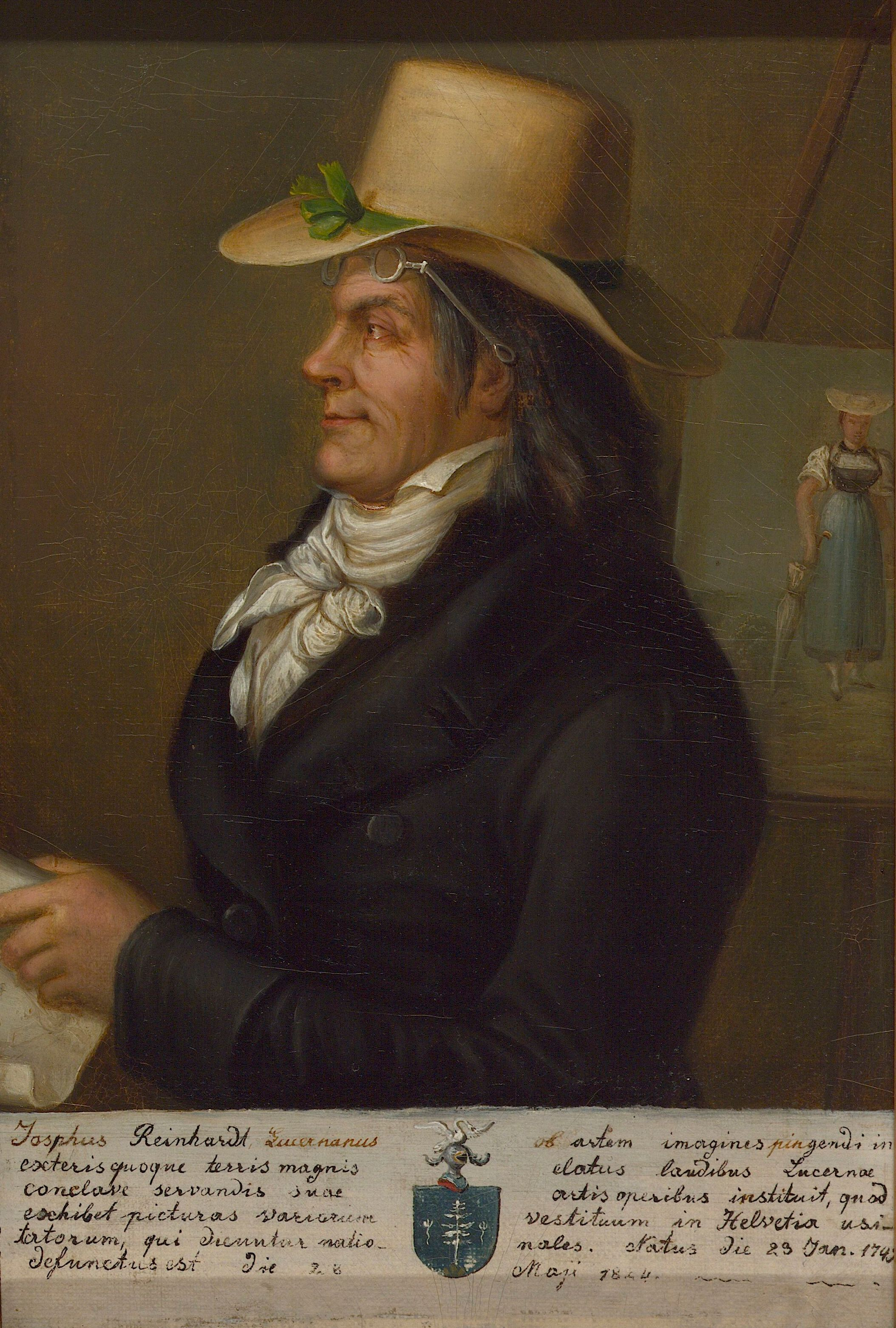
Portrait of Joseph Reinhart by an unknown artist (Zentral- und Hochschulbibliothek Luzern)

Joseph Reinhart (also called Josef Alois Alfons Reinert or Joseph Reinhard; 23 January 1749 – 28 May 1824) was a Swiss artist and costume designer.

He was born in Lucerne to Joseph Ignaz Reinerts and Anna Maria Bättig. In 1765 he received a scholarship from the Lucerne government to study with an unknown artist in Lucca and in Rome, where he spent two years at the Accademia di San Luca in the circle of Pompeo Batoni and Domenico Corvi. On 19 February 1776 he married Anna Schriber, and on 1 January 1777 his daughter Clara was born, who later helped in his workshop as a draftsman.

Reinhart painted many pictures depicting traditional costumes on behalf of the silk ribbon manufacturer Johann Rudolf Meyer. He gained fame primarily through his pictures of costume from all over Switzerland, particularly from the Canton of Basel-Landschaft.

The art historian Sabine Rewald has described Reinhart's style as combining "archaizing mannerisms with close, candid observation and considerable economy of means". Reinhart's work was a significant influence on the 20th-century painter Balthus, who changed his style after discovering and copying several of Reinhart's paintings in the Historisches Museum Bern in 1932.

== Public collections ==
Collections of Reinhart's works are in the Historisches Museum Bern and in the Kunstmuseum Luzern. Pictures and drawings by his daughter Clara Reinhard (1777–1848) have also been preserved. The Kunstmuseum Luzern presented an exhibition of both artists' work from 10 December 2005 to 5 March 2006.

== Gallery ==
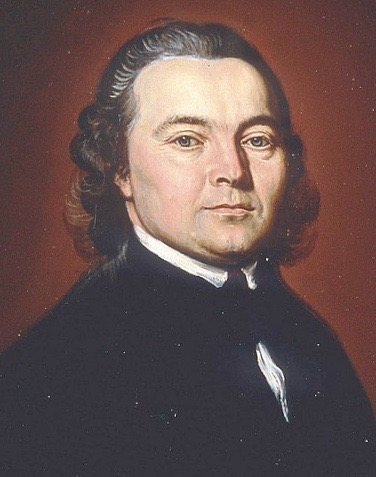
Pastor Johann Jakob Pfleger, 1788

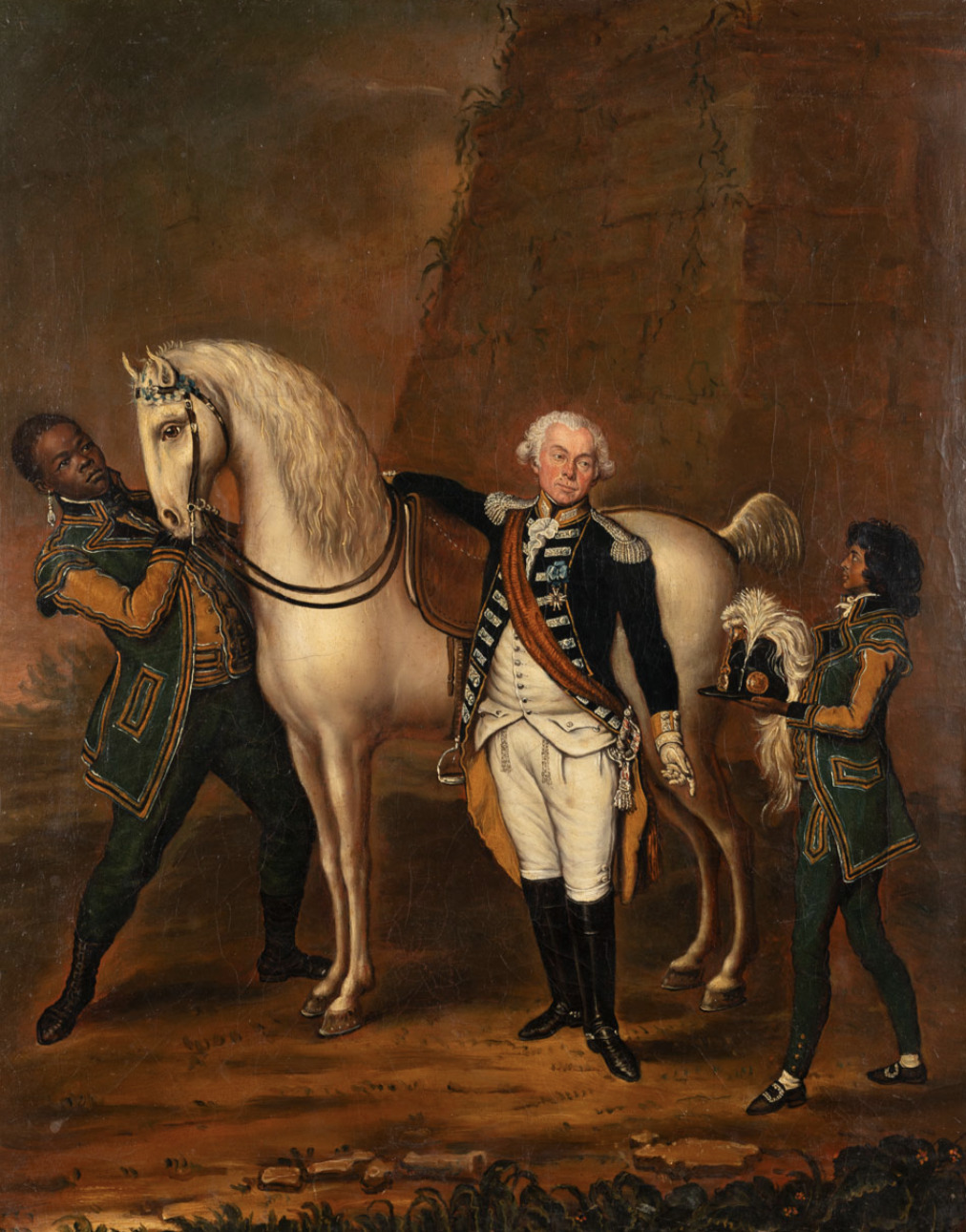
Portrait of Charles-Daniel de Meuron with his slaves Pedro and Vendredi, 1789

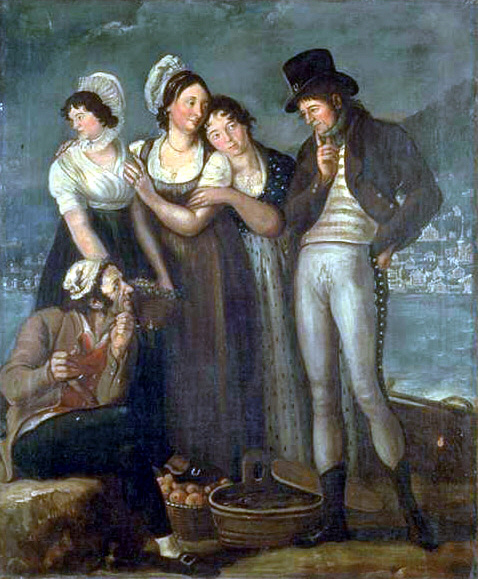
Group of Five Figures in a Rowboat on Lake Zurich, 1802

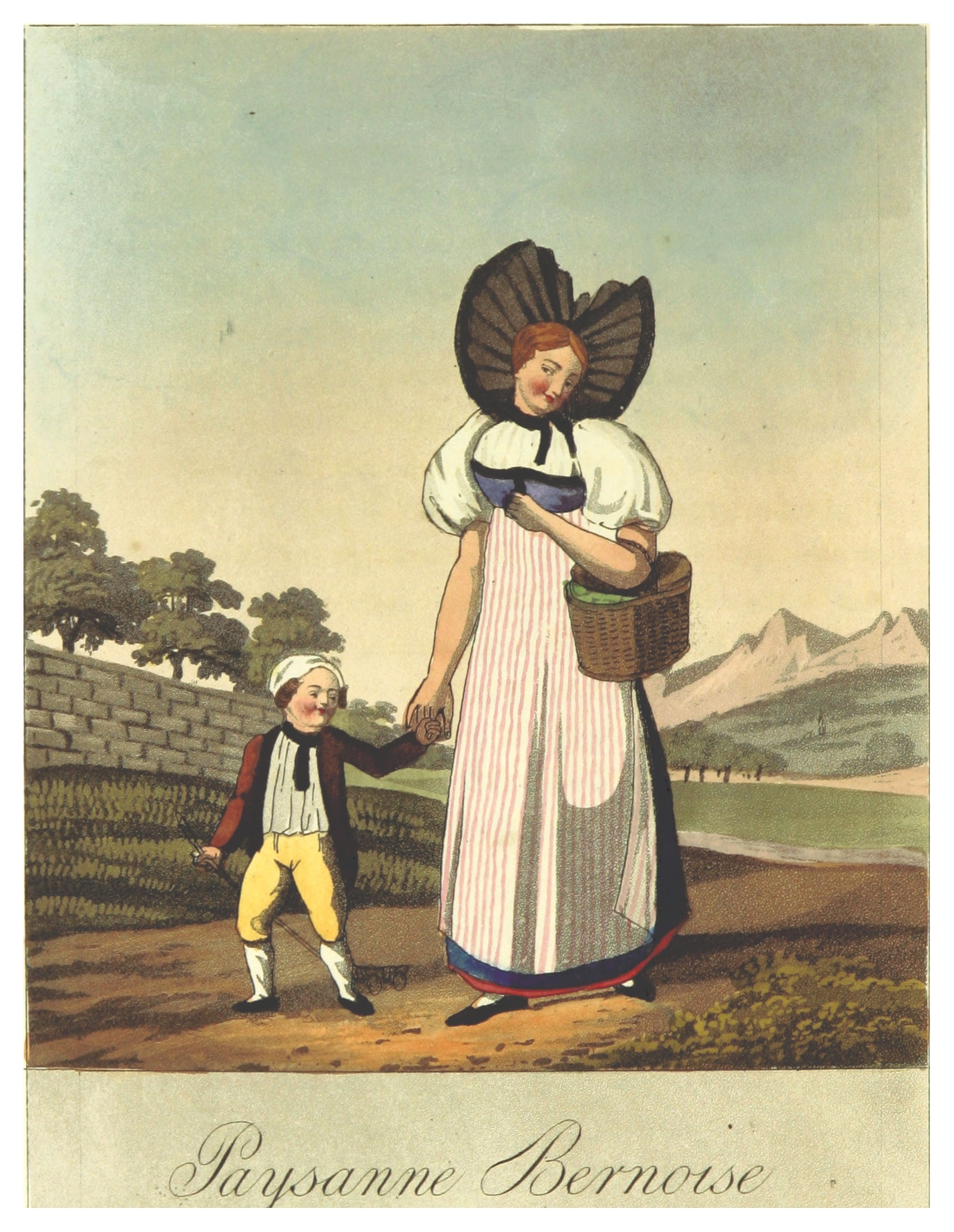
Bernoise Peasant, 1822

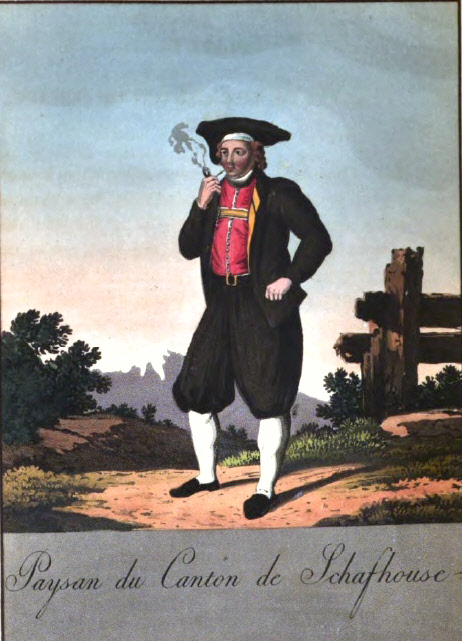
Peasant from the Canton of Schaffhausen, before 1824
