= Austin Girdwood =

Brigadier-General Austin Girdwood CB CMG DSO*
- Born: 24 April 1875; Binstead, Isle of Wight
- Died: 13 March 1951 (aged 75); Westminster, London
- Military career
- Allegiance: United Kingdom
- Branch: British Army
- Rank: Brigadier-General
- Commands: Service Battalion, Border Regiment; 96th Infantry Brigade; 158th (Royal Welch) Infantry Brigade; Officer Commanding the British Troops in Ceylon
- Conflicts: Mahdist War; Second Boer War; First World War
- Awards: Companion of the Order of the Bath; Companion of the Order of St Michael and St George; Distinguished Service Order & Bar

Brigadier-General Austin Claude Girdwood, CB, CMG, DSO & Bar (24 April 1875 – 13 March 1951) was a British Army officer.

== Military career ==
Commissioned into the Northumberland Fusiliers on 6 June 1896, he was promoted Lieutenant in April 1898 and Captain in July 1900. He took part in the Sudan campaign and was present at the Battle of Omdurman and gained the Queen's Sudan Medal and Khedive's Medal with clasp. He thereafter saw action in the Second Boer War taking part in the fighting at Belmont, Enslin, Modder River, Magersfontein, Venterskroon and Rhenoster River and was severely wounded near Kleinfontein on 24 October 1901. He was awarded the Distinguished Service Order and was mentioned in despatches. He was also awarded the Queen's South Africa Medal with four clasps and the King's South Africa Medal with two clasps. He went on to serve in the Mohmand Expedition of 1908. In 1908, he qualified for Staff College, Camberley having passed its exams, yet there were no vacancies. He was admitted to staff college in 1909 on special selection.

He served in France during World War I, gaining promotion to major in September 1915, temporary lieutenant colonel commanding a Service battalion of the Border Regiment, 16 July-20 August 1917 and temporary brigadier general from 21 August 1917, commanding the 96th Infantry Brigade. He was made a breveted lieutenant colonel in January 1918. For his war service he was made a Companion of the Order of St Michael and St George in the 1919 New Year Honours, gained the Belgian Croix de Guerre and was awarded a bar to the DSO and six times mentioned in despatches.

After the war he served as the assistant commandant of the Royal Military College, Sandhurst, and thereafter served with British forces in Iraq. He was appointed a Companion of the Order of the Bath in the 1927 New Year Honours while serving as the brigade commander, 158th (Royal Welch) Infantry Brigade. From 1927 to 1931, he served as Officer Commanding the British Troops in Ceylon with the rank of Brigadier, where he was ex-officio member of the Legislative Council of Ceylon.
