= Charles Leigh (British Army officer) =

British Army officer (1748–1815)

General Charles Leigh
- Born: 1748
- Died: 7 August 1815 (aged 66–67)
- Military career
- Allegiance: United Kingdom
- Branch: British Army
- Rank: General
- Conflicts: American Revolutionary War; Flanders Campaign

General Charles Leigh (1748 – 7 August 1815) was a British Army officer.

== Military career ==
Educated at Eton College, Leigh was commissioned into the 3rd Regiment of Guards on 12 March 1764. He took part in the Battle of Long Island in August 1776, the Battle of White Plains in October 1776 and the Battle of Fort Washington in November 1776 during the American Revolutionary War. He went on to command the flank battalion of guards at the Siege of Valenciennes in June 1793 and the Siege of Dunkirk in August 1793 during the Flanders Campaign.

Leigh raised the 82nd Regiment of Foot (Prince of Wales's Volunteers) in September 1793. He went on to be Commander-in-Chief of Saint Kitts in 1795 and, having been promoted to full general on 25 September 1803, he became Commander-in-Chief of Martinique in September 1805. He also served as Lieutenant-Governor of the Isle of Wight from 1812 to 1815.

Leigh served as colonel of the 82nd (The Prince of Wales's Volunteers) Regiment of Foot from 1793 to 1797, colonel of the 20th (the East Devonshire) Regiment of Foot from 1797 to 1809 and colonel of the 3rd (the East Kent) Regiment of Foot from 1809 to 1815.

His son, Lt-Col George Leigh, married Augusta Byron, the half-sister of the poet Lord Byron.

Military offices
Preceded by New post	Colonel of the 82nd Regiment of Foot (Prince of Wales's Volunteers); 1793–1797	Succeeded by James Stuart
Preceded by West Hyde	Colonel of the 20th (the East Devonshire) Regiment of Foot; 1797–1809	Succeeded by Sir John Stuart
Preceded by Sir Ralph Abercromby	Commander-in-Chief, Windward and Leeward Islands; 1797–1799	Succeeded by Sir Thomas Trigge
Preceded by Thomas Hall	Colonel of the 3rd (the East Kent) Regiment of Foot; 1809–1815	Succeeded by Sir Henry Clinton
