= Charles-Daniel de Meuron =

Swiss army officer and mercenary (1738–1806)

Lieutenant-General Charles-Daniel de Meuron
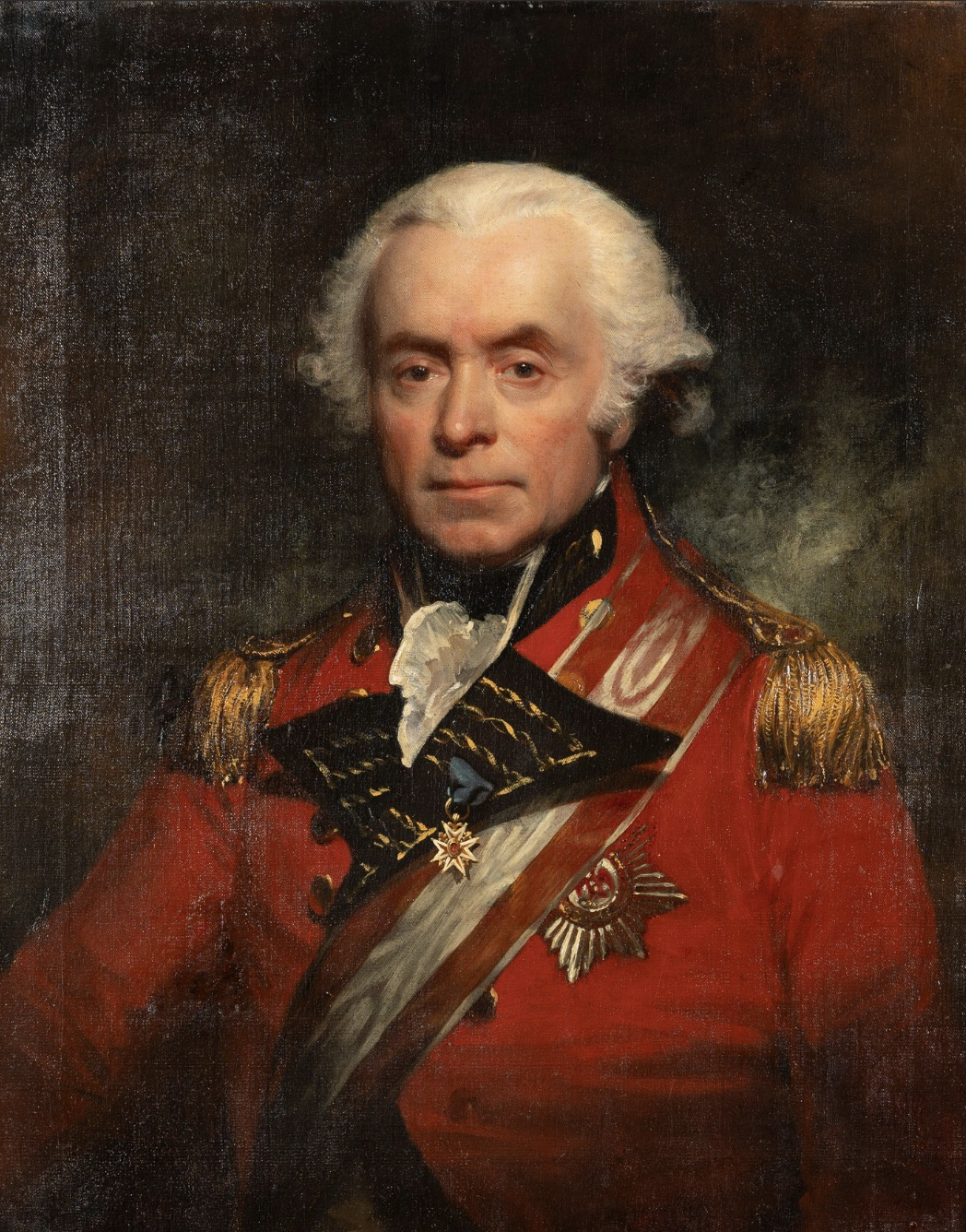
- Portrait by Thomas Hickey, c. 1802
- Born: 6 May 1738; Saint-Sulpice, Neuchâtel, Principality of Neuchâtel
- Died: 4 April 1806 (aged 67); Neuchâtel, Principality of Neuchâtel
- Military career
- Allegiance: France; Dutch East India Company; Great Britain; United Kingdom
- Branch: Troupes de la Marine; French Royal Army; British Army
- Service years: 1755–1806
- Rank: Lieutenant-general (British Army)
- Units: Hallwyl Regiment; Swiss Guards
- Commands: Regiment de Meuron

Lieutenant-General Charles-Daniel de Meuron (6 May 1738 – 4 April 1806) was an army officer and mercenary from the Principality of Neuchâtel who served in the French Revolutionary and Napoleonic Wars. He raised the Regiment de Meuron, which under his command served in both the army of the Dutch East India Company and the British Army.

== Early life ==
Charles-Daniel de Meuron was born in Saint-Sulpice, Neuchâtel, Principality of Neuchâtel on 6 May 1738. He was the son of Théodore de Meuron, a tanner, innkeeper and militia captain, and his wife Elisabeth Dubois. In 1751, de Meuron began an apprenticeship as a merchant in La Brévine, before switching to another merchant based in Liestal. By the next year, he was apprenticing in Strasbourg. In 1755, de Meuron was commissioned into the Hallwyl Regiment, a Swiss regiment of the French Troupes de la Marine, at the rank of ensign. Initially stationed in Rochefort, his unit was embarked on the 74-gun Florissant, which was ordered sail to Martinique in 1758 during the Seven Years' War. On 3 November 1758, Florissant on was badly damaged in an engagement with the 70-gun HMS Buckingham, forcing the French ship to return to France.

In 1762, de Meuron married the Frenchwoman Anne-Marie Filhon de Morveaux in Rochefort. A year later, the Hallwyl Regiment was disbanded with the end of the war, and he started working as a merchant, dealing in colonial goods. De Meuron rejoined the French military in 1765, joining the French Royal Army's Swiss Guards at the rank of second lieutenant; he was eventually promoted to colonel during his thirteen years of service. In 1773, de Meuron was awarded the Order of Military Merit. He attempted on multiple occasions to initiate colonial projects using his contacts at the French court; in 1775, de Meuron unsuccessfully proposed that he be allowed to raise a Swiss regiment for service in the French colony of Cayenne.

== Dutch East India Company service ==
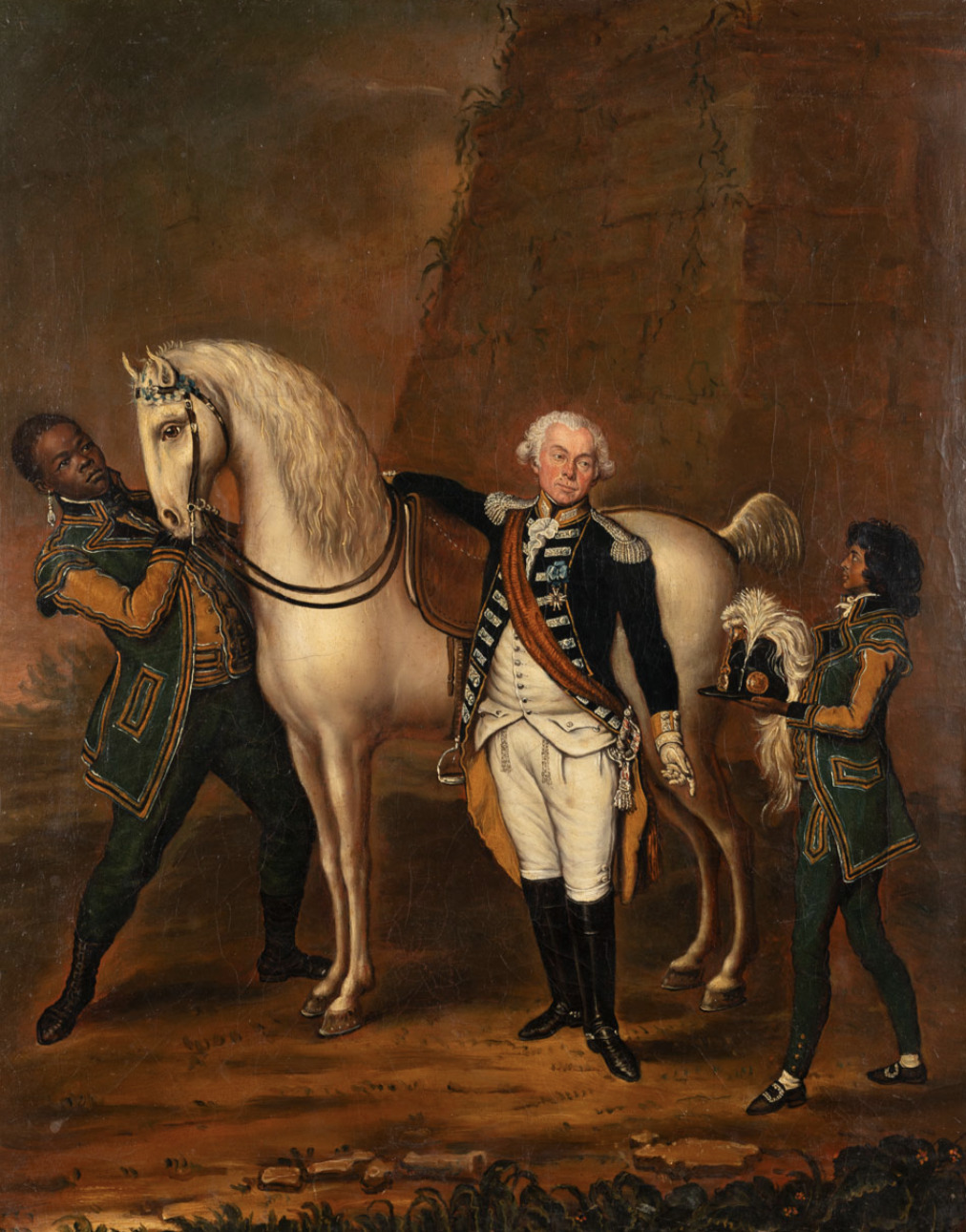
1789 portrait of de Meuron with his slaves Pedro and Vendredi by Joseph Reinhart

In 1781, with the support of his contacts in the French court, de Meuron was allowed to raise a mercenary regiment for service in the Dutch Cape Colony, an overseas possession of the Dutch East India Company (VOC). The regiment, known as the Regiment de Meuron, arrived at the Cape Colony in 1783. Little is known of de Meuron's time in Africa, although contemporary records indicated he owned 12 slaves. In 1786, de Meuron returned to Europe to negotiate with VOC officials regarding additional costs for the regiment. Between 1787 and 1795, he spent time in Holland, Prussia, France and Switzerland, engaging in both commercial dealings and scientific activities with financial support from the Countess Duhamel, a personal friend. During this period, de Meuron operated a colonial goods store in Paris which sold goods imported from the Cape Colony.

In Saint-Sulpice, Neuchâtel, he established a cabinet of curiosities which would go on to form the basis of Neuchâtel's natural history, ethnological and historical collection. De Meuron had acquired a large portion of the cabinet's collection during his time in the Cape Colony, which had been sent to Switzerland. In addition to ethnographic and historical objects, de Meuron also had two of his slaves, a Mozambican named Pedro and an Indian named Vendredi, shipped to Europe. The two men arrived in Vlissingen in 1788 and served at de Meuron's residence in Saint-Sulpice, where both succumbed to a respiratory infection in the winter of 1792.

== British service and death ==
As a result of his poor health, de Meuron had handed command of the Regiment de Meuron over to his brother Pierre Frédéric de Meuron in 1786; Pierre-Frédéric took over control of the regiment upon his arrival at the Cape Colony in 1787. However, de Meuron remained the regiment's colonel and continued to handle the unit's recruitment. In 1795, during the War of the First Coalition, he rejoined his unit, which was now stationed in Dutch Ceylon. As de Meuron believed the VOC had not fulfilled its obligations to him, he signed a secret agreement with Britain agreeing not to the resist the British invasion of Ceylon in 1796 and transfer his unit to the British Army. The Regiment de Meuron served in the Fourth Anglo-Mysore War, taking part in the siege of Seringapatam in 1799. It subsequently served in both the Peninsular War and War of 1812. Despite his unit still being in India, de Meuron himself returned to Europe in 1797. He travelled to London and then to Berlin before returning to Neuchâtel in 1800. He was promoted to lieutenant-general in the British Army in 1802, and in the same year the Irish painter Thomas Hickey painted a portrait of him. De Meuron also divorced from his wife in 1802 as well. He died four years later in Neuchâtel on 4 April 1806.
