= 82nd Regiment of Foot (Prince of Wales's Volunteers) =

- Active: 1793–1881
- Country: Kingdom of Great Britain (1793–1800); United Kingdom (1801–1881)
- Branch: British Army
- Type: Infantry Regiment
- Role: Infantry
- Garrison/HQ: Peninsula Barracks, Warrington
- Engagements: French Revolutionary Wars; Napoleonic Wars; Crimean War; Indian Rebellion

The 82nd Regiment of Foot (Prince of Wales's Volunteers) was an infantry regiment of the British Army, raised in 1793. Under the Childers Reforms it amalgamated with the 40th (the 2nd Somersetshire) Regiment of Foot to form the Prince of Wales's Volunteers (South Lancashire Regiment) in 1881.

== History ==
=== Formation ===
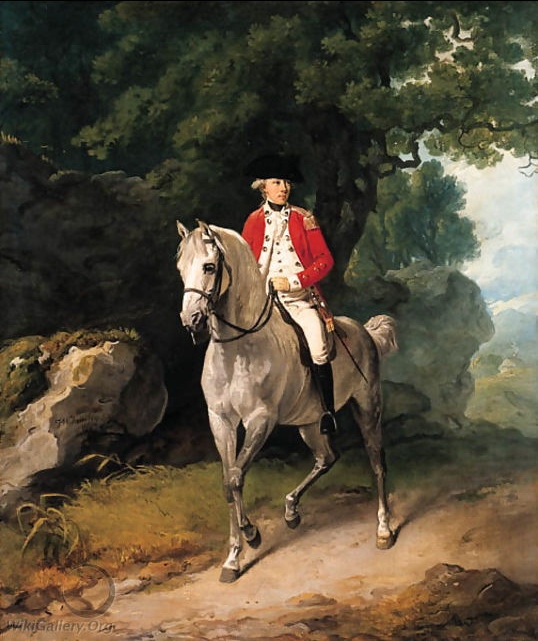
General Henry Pigot, colonel of the regiment throughout the Napoleonic Wars

The regiment was raised by General Charles Leigh as the 82nd Regiment of Foot, in response to the threat posed by the French Revolution, on 27 September 1793. It embarked for the West Indies in June 1795 and was deployed to Santo Domingo in the Dominican Republic in August 1795. On arrival, the regiment was sent to Port-au-Prince to reinforce the garrison there. Over the following year they repelled several attacks from French troops before returning to England in January 1799. The regiment also took part in an expedition to Quiberon Bay in June 1800 and then transferred to Menorca in July 1800 before returning home in June 1802. It absorbed the Prince of Wales's Volunteers in 1802, incorporating their name to become the 82nd Regiment of Foot (Prince of Wales's Volunteers).

=== Napoleonic Wars ===
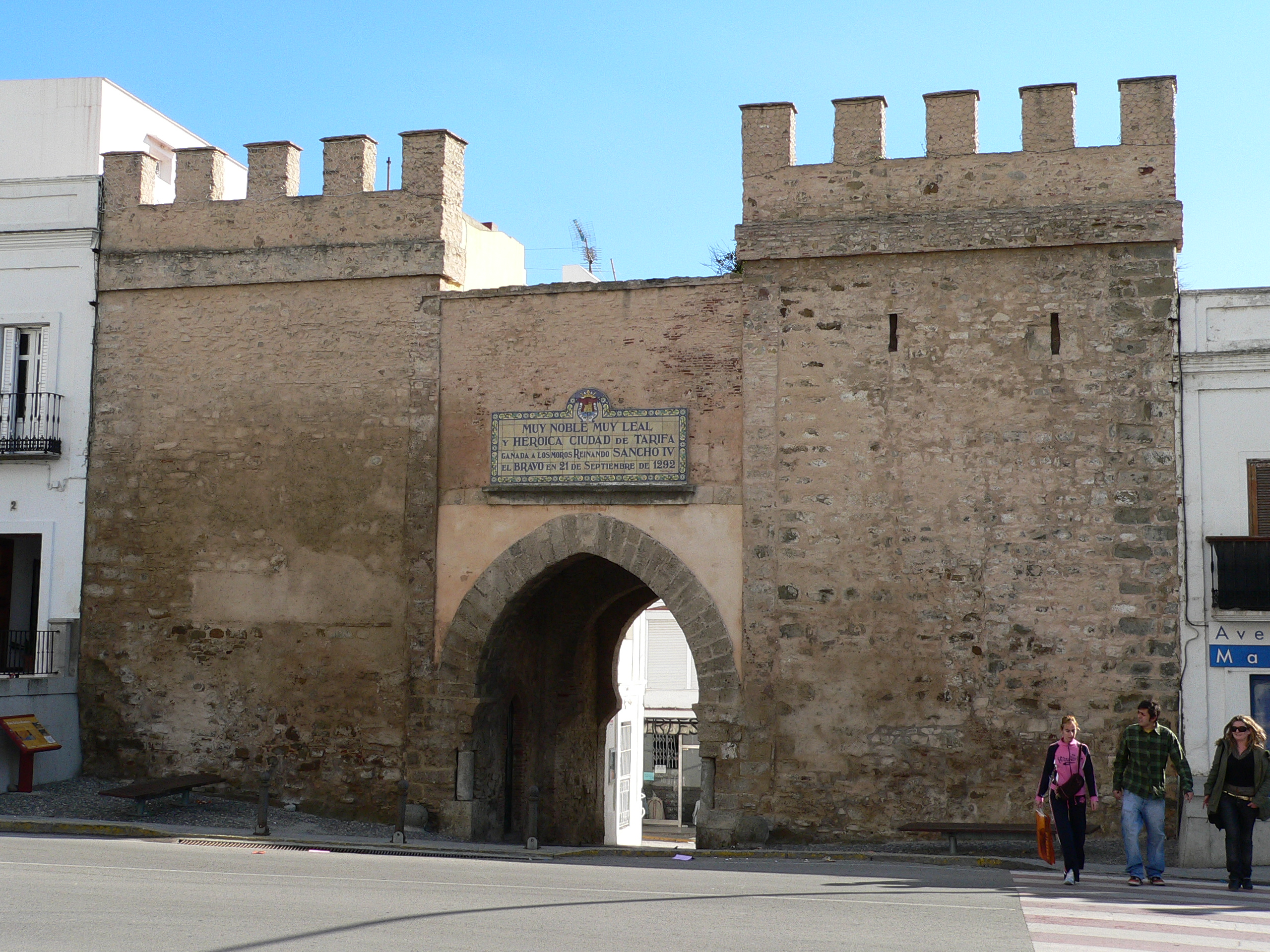
Puerta de Jerez, a Tarifa city gate from the Middle Ages

A second battalion was raised in August 1804 but remained in the United Kingdom throughout the Napoleonic Wars. The 1st battalion saw action at the Battle of Copenhagen in August 1807 during the Gunboat War. It embarked for Portugal in early August 1808 for service in the Peninsular War and saw action at the Battle of Roliça in August 1808, the Battle of Vimeiro later that month and the Battle of Corunna in January 1809 as well as the subsequent evacuation. The battalion then took part in the disastrous Walcheren Campaign in autumn 1809.

The battalion returned to the Peninsula in spring 1811 and saw action at the Battle of Barrosa in March 1811, the Siege of Tarifa in December 1811 and the Battle of Vitoria in June 1813 as well as the Siege of San Sebastián in July 1813. It then pursued the French Army into France and fought at the Battle of the Pyrenees in July 1813, the Battle of Nivelle in November 1813 and the Battle of the Nive in December 1813 as well as the Battle of Orthez in February 1814.

The battalion then embarked for North America for service in the War of 1812. It saw action on the Canadian frontier in 1814 which later earned the battle honour 'Niagara'. The battalion left for home in June 1815 but, shortly after arriving in England, it embarked for Ostend from where it marched to Paris. Meanwhile, the second battalion was disbanded in December 1815. On the return journey from France, in January 1816, the brig Boadicea was wrecked in heavy storms off the east coast of Ireland while carrying 290 troops and 34 women and children from the regiment: 190 people died when the ship went down off Courtmacsherry.

=== The Victorian era ===
The regiment embarked for Mauritius in January 1819 and returned home in March 1832. It then sailed for Gibraltar in January 1837, on to the West Indies in December 1839 and on to Canada in April 1843 before returning home in May 1848. It then embarked for the Ionian Islands in January 1855; it also saw action at the Siege of Sevastopol in summer 1855 during the Crimean War.

The regiment returned to India in February 1857 to help suppress the Indian Rebellion. It took part in the recapture of Cawnpore in July 1857 and then took part in the reinforcement of Lucknow defending the residency until it was relieved in November 1857. It transferred to Aden in 1869 and returned home in 1870.

As part of the Cardwell Reforms of the 1870s, where single-battalion regiments were linked together to share a single depot and recruiting district in the United Kingdom, the 82nd was linked with the 40th (the 2nd Somersetshire) Regiment of Foot, and assigned to district no. 14 at Peninsula Barracks, Warrington. On 1 July 1881 the Childers Reforms came into effect and the regiment amalgamated with the 40th (the 2nd Somersetshire) Regiment of Foot to form the Prince of Wales's Volunteers (South Lancashire Regiment).

== Battle honours ==
Battle honours won by the Regiment were:

- Peninsular War: Roliça, Vimiera, Vitoria, Pyrenees, Nivelle, Orthez, Peninsula
- American War of 1812: Niagara
- Crimean War: Sevastopol
- Indian Mutiny: Lucknow

== Colonels of the Regiment ==
Regimental colonels were:

82nd Regiment of Foot

- 1793–1797: Gen. Charles Leigh
- 1797–1798: Gen. James Stuart
- 1798–1836: Gen. Sir Henry Pigot, GCMG

82nd Regiment of Foot (Prince of Wales's Volunteers) - (1802)

- 1836–1841: Gen. Sir John Wilson, KCB
- 1841–1850: Lt-Gen. Sir Andrew Pilkington, KCB
- 1850–1856: Lt-Gen. Francis Miles Milman
- 1856–1859: Lt-Gen. Nicholas Hamilton, KH
- 1859–1872: Gen. Hon. Thomas Ashburnham, CB
- 1872–1881: Gen. William Samuel Newton

== Sources ==
- Jarvis, Brevet-Major (1866). "Historical record of the Eighty-Second Regiment or Prince of Wales's Volunteers". W.O. Mitchell.
