= G. L. C. Money =

British Army general (1848–1929)

Brigadier-General G. L. C. Money CB DSO DL JP
- Born: 14 September 1848
- Died: 16 November 1929 (aged 81)
- Military career
- Allegiance: United Kingdom
- Branch: British Army
- Rank: Brigadier-General
- Unit: Queen's Own Cameron Highlanders
- Commands: 1st Battalion, Queen's Own Cameron Highlanders; Officer Commanding the British Troops in Ceylon
- Conflicts: Anglo-Egyptian War; Mahdist War
- Awards: Companion of the Order of the Bath, Distinguished Service Order

Brigadier-General Gordon Lorn Campbell Money, CB, DSO, DL, JP (14 September 1848 – 16 November 1929) was a British Army officer.

== Military career ==
Born to William J. H. Money, of the Bengal Civil Service, and Elizabeth Moffat, daughter of William Moffat, of Eden Hall, Roxburghshire. He was commissioned into 79th Highlanders following training at the Royal Military College, Sandhurst on 8 February 1868. He was promoted Lieutenant in 1871, Captain in 1880, and Major in 1884. He took part in the Gordon Relief Expedition in 1884 and on 11 May 1885 he was appointed Assistant Military Secretary to Lieutenant General Sir Frederick Stephenson, commanding in Lower Egypt, and in that capacity took part in the operations in the Sudan in 1883 and 1886, and served until 1887. He was awarded the Distinguished Service Order for action at Battle of Ginnis, Egypt Medal and the fourth class of the Order of Osmanieh. In May 1894 took command of the Queen's Own Cameron Highlanders from Lieutenant Colonel A. Y. Leslie. In 1895, he was appointed ADC to Queen Victoria and in 1897 he sailed, as Commanding Officer, with the 1st Battalion to Egypt. He commanded the battalion at the Battle of Atbara and Battle of Omdurman where his horse was shot under him. He was present at the Memorial Service for General Gordon at Khartoum. He was given the honor of carrying Kitchener's dispatches home to the Queen. For his services he was appointed a Companion of the Order of the Bath, as well as the Queen's Sudan Medal, Khedive's Star and the Khedive's Sudan Medal (1897). He commanded the 1st Battalion Cameron Highlanders until 21 May 1899. In 1901, he was ADC to King Edward VII and was promoted to Colonel in 1903 and temporary Brigadier-General with his appointment to Officer Commanding the British Troops in Ceylon from 1903 to 1905. Money accompanied the coffin of Queen Victoria in her funeral procession in 1901, and marched in the King's coronation procession in 1902. He retired on 14 September 1905. Money was later appointed a Deputy Lieutenant and Justice of Peace for Berwickshire.
