= General's House, Nuwara Eliya =

General's House
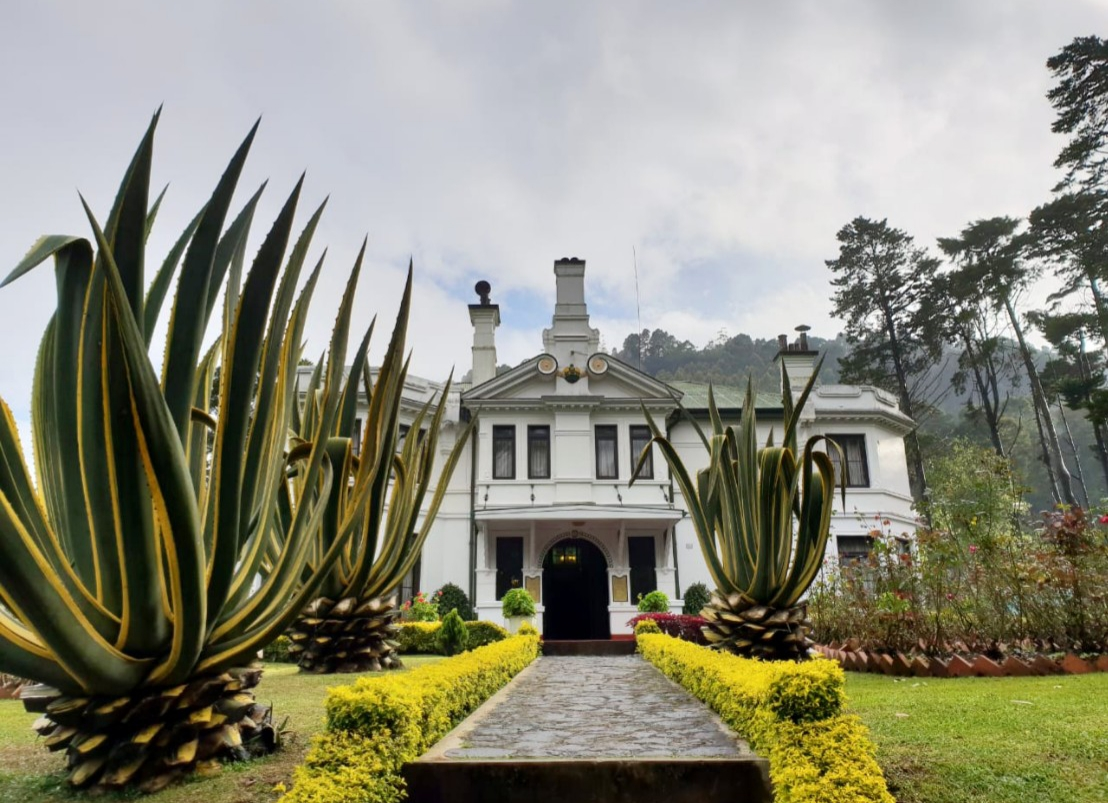
- Interactive map of the General's House area

General information
- Location: Grand Hotel Drive, Nuwara Eliya, Sri Lanka
- Coordinates: 6.971112°N 80.762907°E
- Current tenants: Parliament of Sri Lanka
- Client: Government of Sri Lanka

General's House is a country house in Nuwara Eliya, Sri Lanka. It is the vacationing and country residence of Members of Parliament. Located within the limits of the Nuwara Eliya Municipal Council along the Grand Hotel Drive, next to The Hill Club. It is maintained by the Members Services Office of the Parliament Secretariat.

== History ==
In 1904 the Colonial Secretary authorised the construction of a new residence for the General Officer Commanding at Nuwara Eliya. In 1906 a sum of £20,882 was allocated for the acquisition of the site. Built as an English country house, during the late 19th century by the British Colonial administration of the island for the use of the British General Officer Commanding, Ceylon as a vacationing residence in the cold highlands of Nuwara Eliya. Following independence in 1948 the house became the official vacationing residence of the Commander of the Ceylon Army and later was transferred to Parliament Secretariat. The nineteen room bungalow is currently available for the exclusive use by members of parliament and their families, at a heavily subsidised rate.

== Haunting ==
The house is said to be haunted by the ghost of an English lady who was found dead in one of the rooms under mysterious circumstances.

== See also ==
- Queen's Cottage
- Prime Minister's Lodge
- Parliament of Sri Lanka
