= Robert Drayton =

British Colonial Administrator

Sir Robert Harry Drayton CMG

Chief Secretary of Ceylon
- In office 1942–1946
- Monarch: George VI
- Preceded by: Guy Stanley Wodeman
- Succeeded by: Post abolished

Personal details
- Born: 14 April 1892 Exeter, Devon, England
- Died: 20 February 1963 (aged 70) Weybridge, Surrey, England
- Citizenship: British
- Spouse: Gertrude Edith née Phillips
- Children: Denys, Dianne, Ruth
- Education: Exeter School, University of London

Military service
- Branch/service: British Army
- Years of service: 1914–1918
- Rank: Lieutenant
- Unit: Machine Gun Corps

Sir Robert Harry Drayton CMG (14 April 1892 – 20 February 1963), was a lawyer and a senior colonial civil servant who worked in Palestine, Tanganyika, Ceylon, Jamaica and Pakistan. He served as the Chief Secretary of Ceylon from 1942 to 1947 and as the Legal Secretary of Ceylon.

Robert Harry Drayton was born 14 April 1892 in Exeter, Devon, the oldest son of Harry Godwin Drayton (1865–1927), a bookseller, and Emma Rose Hetty née Brealy (1866–1926).

Drayton was educated at Exeter School before being articled to Roberts and Andrew, of Exeter. At the outbreak of World War I he enlisted in the Public Schools Battalions, serving as a sergeant, and was appointed as a lieutenant in the Machine Gun Corps, fighting in France from January 1916 to September 1917. After graduating from the University of London with a law degree, he qualified as a solicitor in 1919, joining the Treasurer Solicitor's Department.

On 16 October 1920 he married Gertrude Edith Phillips (1886–1967), an Australian who had seen war service as a theatre nursing sister with ANZAC forces in Gallipoli, at Christ Church, Holborn, Middlesex. They had a son and two daughters: Denys (1923–2012), a major in the British India Army (7th Gurkha Rifles), Aide-de-camp to the British High Commissioner in Malaya, Sir Henry Gurney and Superintendent of the Uganda Police Force; Dianne (1928–2015), a senior administrative assistant at Reuters and the founding secretary of the Reuter Society; and Ruth.

Drayton joined the Colonial Legal Service and was appointed the assistant legal secretary in Mandatory Palestine in 1920 and in 1922 the assistant Attorney General (which subsequently became the Solicitor General) in Palestine. In 1931 he was appointed legal draftsman to the Palestine Government and in 1933, he compiled and catalogued the laws, decrees, regulations, rules, which were issued in Palestine in addition to the British Royal laws and decrees enforced in the Mandate, The Laws of Palestine : in force on the 31st day of December 1933.

Drayton passed the bar at Gray's Inn in 1934, becoming a barrister, following which he was appointed as the Attorney General for Tanganyika.

In 1939 he was transferred to Ceylon and appointed as the Legal Secretary of Ceylon in 1940, before succeeded Guy Stanley Wodeman as Chief Secretary of Ceylon in 1942.

In the 1942 Birthday Honours he was made a Companion of the Order of St Michael and St George and on 22 February 1944 he was knighted, as part of the 1944 New Year Honours list, for his service as Chief Secretary of Ceylon. He returned to England in 1947 when Ceylon gained its independence and served for three years as the Director of the Statutory Publications Office, the agency responsible for the publication and indexing of statutes.

In 1950 Drayton returned to Asia as chief draftsman to the Constituent Assembly of Pakistan, serving in the role for three years.

Drayton died on 20 February 1963 at The Hospital in Weybridge, Surrey.

== Bibliography ==
- Drayton, Robert Harry (1934). The Laws of Palestine : in force on the 31st day of December 1933. Jerusalem: Waterlow and Sons.
- Drayton, Robert Harry, ed. (1950). The Statutes: From the Twentieth Year of King Henry the Third to the [tenth Chapter of the Twelfth, Thirteenth, and Fourteenth Years of King George the Sixth] A.D. 1235-[1948]. Vol. 6. London: H.M. Stationery Office.
