= Patrick Alexander Agnew =

Major-general Patrick Alexander Agnew

1st Military Governor of British Ceylon
- In office August 1795 – 1 March 1796
- Monarch: George III
- Preceded by: None; Office Created
- Succeeded by: James Stuart

Personal details
- Born: 1765
- Died: 1813 (aged 47–48)

Patrick Alexander Agnew of Dalreagle (1765–1813) was the first Military Governor of British Ceylon in Trincomalee. He was appointed in August 1795 and was governor until 1 March 1796. He was succeeded by James Stuart. In 1811 he became major general of the East India Company.

== Family ==
Patrick Alexander Agnew of Dalreagle was son of Lieutenant Colonel Alexander Agnew 3rd of Dalreagle, Judge Advocate for North Britain (1722 – 1768) and the great grandson of Alexander Agnew 1st of Dalreagle, a natural son of Sir Andrew Agnew of Lochnaw 3rd Baronet. He was born in 1764 and married on 14 April 1794 to Margaret Mackintosh (d. 1814). He died on 8 January 1813 and is buried at St Swithins, Walcot near Bath. A descendant of his was Sir Patrick Dalreagle Agnew KBE (1868 – 1925), Indian Administrator and Officiating Judge, Chief Court Punjab.

== Career ==
He was commissioned on 20 April 1744 as an ensign into the Madras European Regiment. He took part in two campaigns against the Tippoo as a staff officer. He was deputy adjutant general to Lord Cornwallis (1792), and later chief of staff to the commander at the capture of Ceylon. He was military secretary to General George Harris (1799), in the next campaign against the Tippoo and later that year was appointed adjutant general for the army. As a lieutenant colonel he commanded the force to put down the Polygar rebellion (1801), for which he was commended by Lord Clive. He was appointed colonel of the 21st Native Infantry (1804). Two years later he was recalled to London to account for the mutinies against the introduction of the new turban, which he is said to have recommended. He was exonerated and returned to India as adjutant general to the Java Expedition; awarded the Java medal when he returned with dispatches.

Government offices
Preceded by None; Office Created	Military Governor of British Ceylon; 1795–1796	Succeeded by James Stuart
