= James Stuart (British Army officer, born 1741) =

General James Stuart
- Portrait by Thomas Lawrence, 1801

2nd Military Governor of British Ceylon
- In office 1 March 1796 – 1 January 1797
- Monarch: George III
- Preceded by: Patrick Alexander Agnew
- Succeeded by: Welbore Ellis Doyle

1st General Officer Commanding, Ceylon
- In office 1796–1796
- Preceded by: New Command
- Succeeded by: Welbore Ellis Doyle

Personal details
- Born: 2 March 1741 Blairhall Perthshire, Scotland
- Died: 29 April 1815 Charles Street, Berkeley Square, London
- Resting place: St. James's Chapel, London, England
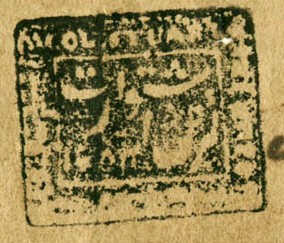
- Signature

Military service
- Allegiance: United Kingdom
- Branch/service: British Army
- Rank: General
- Commands: General Officer Commanding, Ceylon; Madras Army
- Battles/wars: American Revolutionary War; Second Anglo-Mysore War; Third Anglo-Mysore War; Fourth Anglo-Mysore War; Second Anglo-Maratha War

General James Stuart (1741–1815) was a British Army officer who served in North America during the American Revolutionary War and took part in various campaigns in British India. He was the first General Officer Commanding, Ceylon and second Military Governor of British Ceylon. He was appointed on 1 March 1796 and was Governor until 1 January 1797. He was succeeded by Welbore Ellis Doyle.

== Early life ==
Stuart was born on 2 March 1741. He was the third son of John Stuart of Blairhall in Perthshire. His mother was Anne, daughter of Francis Stuart, 7th Earl of Moray. Stuart was educated at schools in Culross and Dunfermline, Scotland. He studied law at the University of Edinburgh and then joined the British Army, serving in the American War of Independence.

== Military career ==
=== India and Ceylon ===
Promoted to major in the 78th Foot, he arrived in India in 1782 and was promoted to lieutenant-colonel on 14 February. He took part in Sir Eyre Coote's campaign against Hyder in the Second Anglo-Mysore War, and was present at the siege of Cuddalore where he commanded the attack on the right of the main position in the assault of 13 July 1782.

He served in the campaign of 1790, under General Sir William Medows, against Tipu Sultan, attacking the fortresses of Dindigul and Palghaut. He served under Cornwallis during the campaigns of 1791–2, and led the siege of Seringapatam, commanding the centre column in the assault of 6 February 1792. Promoted to colonel in August, he returned to Madras in 1794.

Promoted to major-general in 1795, he took command of the expedition against Dutch possessions in Ceylon that year. After the whole island was secured in 1796, Stuart became commander-in-chief in the same year of the forces in Madras.

He was made colonel of the 82nd Regiment of Foot in 1797, transferring the following year to the 72nd Regiment of Foot, a position he held until his death.

In 1799 he commanded the Bombay Army in the last war against Tipu, which occupied Coorg, and repulsed Tipu at Seedaseer on 6 March. On 15 March he joined with Major General George Harris (afterwards Lord Harris) before the 1799 Battle of Seringapatam and took charge of the operations on the northern side of the city. After its capture he received the thanks of both Houses of Parliament.

== Later career and death ==
He became commander-in-chief of the Madras Army in 1801. Promoted to lieutenant-general in 1802, he took part in the Second Anglo-Maratha War in 1803 but in 1805 returned to England in bad health. He was promoted to the rank of full general on 1 January 1812.

He died without issue at Charles Street, Berkeley Square, London, on 29 April 1815 and was buried in a vault in St. James's Chapel, Hampstead Road, London.

Government offices
Preceded by Patrick Alexander Agnew	Military Governor of British Ceylon; 1796–1797	Succeeded by Welbore Ellis Doyle
Military offices
New office	General Officer Commanding, Ceylon; 1796–1797	Succeeded by Welbore Ellis Doyle
Preceded by Robert Abercromby	C-in-C, Bombay Army; 1797–1800	Succeeded by Oliver Nicolls
Preceded by John Braithwaite	C-in-C, Madras Army; 1801–1804	Succeeded by John Cradock
Military offices
Preceded by Hon. Sir Adam Williamson	Colonel of the 72nd (Highland) Regiment of Foot; 1798–1815	Succeeded by Sir Rowland Hill, 1st Viscount Hill
Preceded by Charles Leigh	Colonel of the 82nd (The Prince of Wales's Volunteers) Regiment of Foot; 1797–1798	Succeeded by Sir Henry Pigot
