= Regiment de Meuron =

Régiment de Meuron
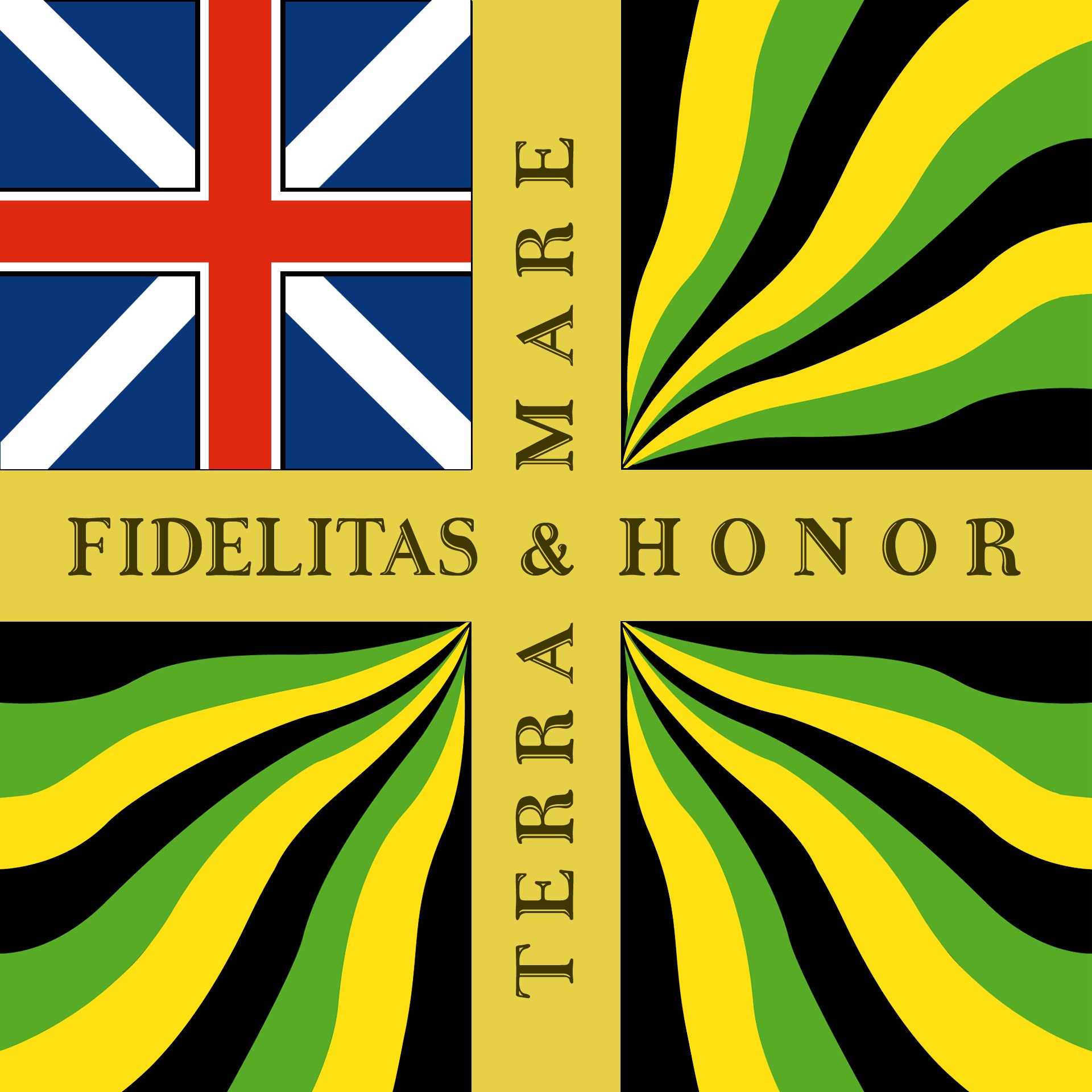
- The regiment's colours in British service
- Active: 1781–1816
- Allegiance: Dutch East India Company (1781–1795); Great Britain (1795–1800); United Kingdom (1801–1816)
- Branch: British Army (1795–1816)
- Type: Line Infantry
- Patron: Charles-Daniel de Meuron
- Colors: Red Coats with Sky Blue (Light Blue) Facings (when in British Service)
- Engagements: Fourth Anglo-Mysore War; Napoleonic Wars; Peninsular War; War of 1812; Pemmican War
- Battle honours: Siege of Seringapatam (1799); Battle of Plattsburgh

The Regiment de Meuron was a regiment of infantry originally raised in Switzerland in 1781 for service with the Dutch East India Company (VOC). At the time the French, Spanish, Dutch and other armies employed units of Swiss mercenaries. The regiment was named for its commander, Colonel Charles-Daniel de Meuron, who was born in Neuchâtel in 1738.

== Dutch service ==
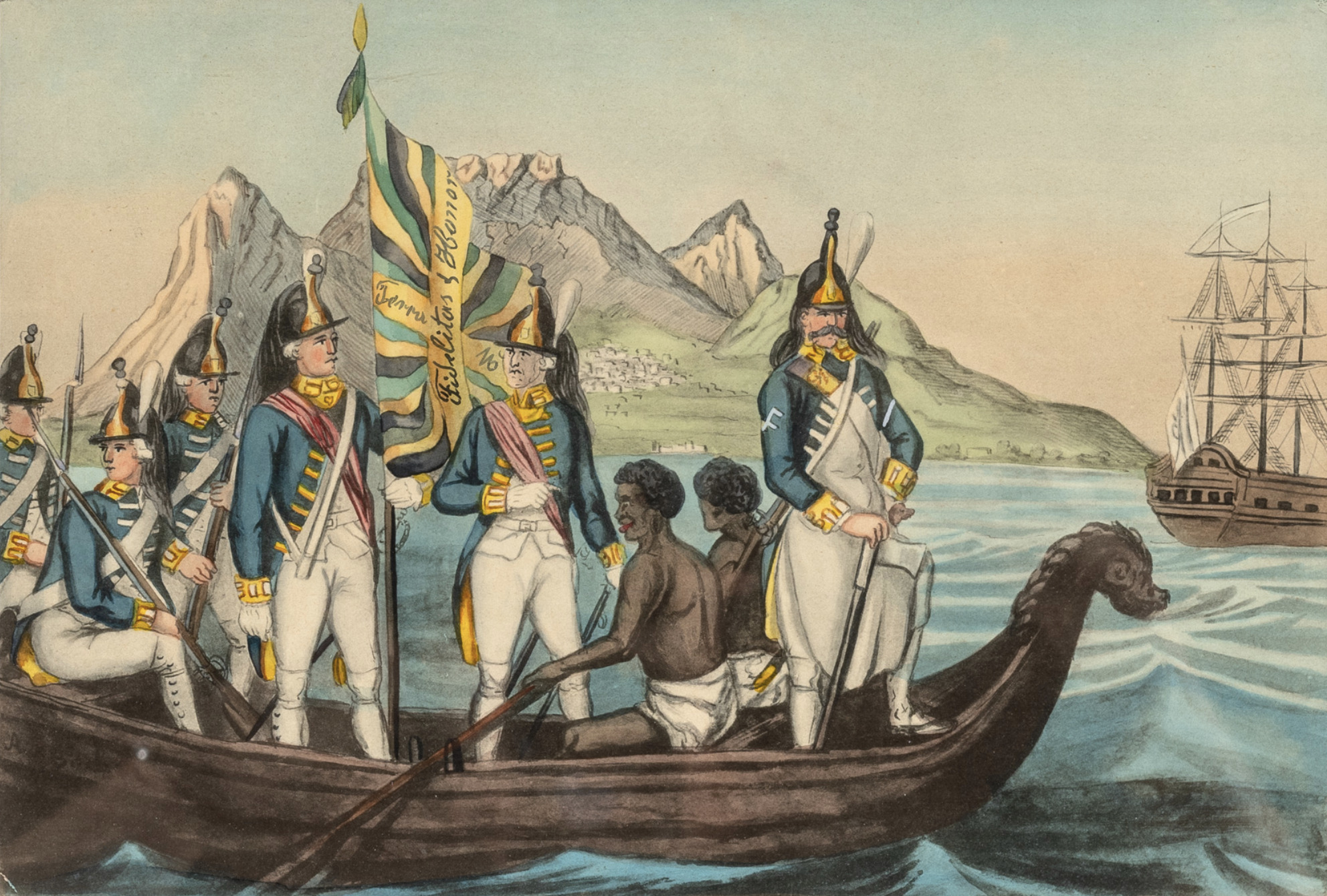
The regiment arriving in the Cape Colony

The regiment served the Dutch East India Company (VOC) in the VOC colonies of the Cape Colony and Ceylon. In 1795, while the regiment was stationed in Ceylon, revolutionary French forces invaded the Netherlands, overthrew the Dutch Republic and replaced it with the Batavian Republic. As a result, the regiment's pay by the VOC fell into abeyance. Later that year the Kew Letters were issued by the deposed stadtholder, William V, Prince of Orange, ordering the surviving Dutch colonies to surrender themselves to the British for safe keeping. The governor of Ceylon did not immediately do so, instead seeking clarification of the situation in the Netherlands. A delegation of Swiss soldiers and officers approached Count de Meuron, who retained the status of regimental proprietor, to discuss their overdue pay and the uncertain political situation.

== Transition ==
As the governor was awaiting clarification, the British Secretary of State for War, Henry Dundas, acting on intelligence, convinced Prof. Hugh Cleghorn, of the University of Aberdeen, to travel to Neuchâtel to negotiate with Charles Daniel. Cleghorn persuaded Charles Daniel to come with him to Madras to facilitate negotiations with Pierre Frédéric de Meuron, Charles Daniel's brother and the commander of the regiment in Ceylon. Charles Daniel was able to smuggle a letter to his brother Pierre Frederick via a ball of Edam cheese. Subsequently, the Swiss agreed to hand over control of the regiment to the British, on the condition that they would not be required to serve against their former Dutch employers.

The defection of the Swiss greatly reduced the strength of the Dutch forces in Ceylon and the Swiss provided fortification details to the British. The Dutch put up a pro-forma resistance using their own troops, and then surrendered Columbo to the British on 15 February 1796. (Note: The Regiment de Meuron may not have participated in the battle, but they were listed among the units that would share in the prize money awarded in 1802 for the capture of the town and fortress of Columbo.) The regiment formally entered British service, with the understanding that the British would enroll them at the same rate as regular British soldiers and give them the back pay owed by the VOC. The British subsequently took over control of the colony as British Ceylon. Professor Cleghorn received £5000 as a reward for his role in the project. He also became the Chief Secretary of Ceylon. However, Cleghorn and Governor Frederick North, the first British civilian governor of the island, did not get on. Cleghorn resigned his post and returned to Scotland.

== British service ==
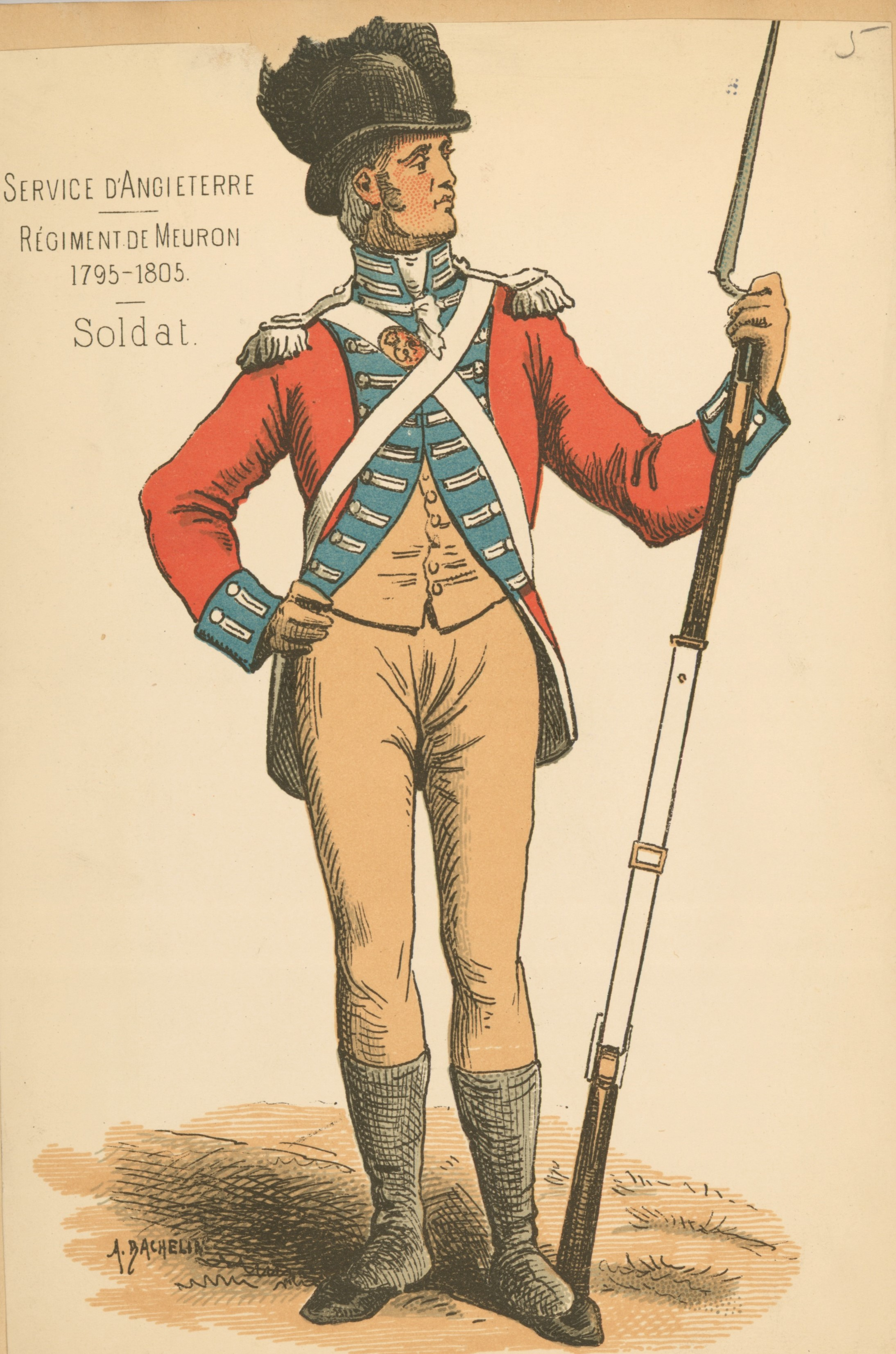
A regimental private between 1795 and 1805

In August 1799, Colonel the Count De Meuron was breveted a Major-General in the British Army. Colonel Pierre Frederick Count De Meuron was breveted a Major-General in the Army, effective 1 January 1798. The order was issued in 1802 and backdated. Charles Daniel was eventually promoted to Lieutenant General, but then returned to Switzerland. Pierre Frederick remained in Ceylon with the regiment, and for a while was Acting Governor for the Colony until North arrived on 12 October 1798.

The Meuron Regiment subsequently served in the Fourth Anglo-Mysore War of 1799, the Mediterranean, and Peninsula Campaigns of the Napoleonic Wars 1806 to 1812. The first mention of the regiment in combat for the British was during the siege of Seringapatam in 1799. Over time, especially by the time of the Peninsular campaigns, difficulties in obtaining replacements from Switzerland led to the regiment recruiting some Spanish and Portuguese recruits.

The regiment was finally posted to Canada to serve in the War of 1812. During the war, the Regiment served at the Battle of Plattsburgh. Later some of its soldiers also served at the Red River Colony. Some 150 recently discharged soldiers from the Regiment de Meuron and De Watteville's Regiment, still retaining their uniforms, participated in the Pemmican War. Rue des Meurons in the Winnipeg suburb of Saint Boniface is named after the regiment.

== Fate ==
In 1816 the Meuron Regiment, together with other Swiss units in British service, was disbanded.

== Garrison Cemetery, Seringapatam ==
The Garrison Cemetery is located in Seringapatam, India, on the banks of the river Cauvery, about 300m from the Bangalore Mysore Highway. It consists of about 307 graves of the European officers killed in the siege of Seringapatam in 1799, and their family members. The cemetery includes 80 graves of the officers of the Regiment de Meuron, and the rest of the graves are their family members.

== Notes, citations and references ==
Notes

Citations

References

- A. Baur & Co. Ltd.: 100 years in Sri Lanka. (1897-1997). (1997). (A. Baur & Co.).
- de Meuron, Guy (1982). Le Régiment Meuron, 1781-1816. Editions d'En bas. ISBN 978-2-8290-0028-7.
- David C.J.Howell, An Account of HM's De Meuron Regiment, Swiss Mercenaries in the Service of the Crown 1795-1816, Tichborne Press, Leicester 2023 PB 270pp
