= Maxwell MacLagan Wedderburn =

Sir Maxwell MacLagan Wedderburn KBE

Acting Governor of British Ceylon
- In office 30 June 1937 – 16 October 1937
- Monarch: George VI
- Preceded by: Reginald Edward Stubbs
- Succeeded by: Andrew Caldecott

Personal details
- Born: 25 March 1883
- Died: 30 June 1953 (aged 70)

Sir Maxwell MacLagan Wedderburn KBE (25 March 1883 – 30 June 1953) was an acting Governor of British Ceylon. He was appointed on 30 June 1937 and was acting Governor until 16 October 1937. He was succeeded by Andrew Caldecott.

Government offices
Preceded by Reginald Edward Stubbs	acting Governor of British Ceylon; 1937-1937	Succeeded by Andrew Caldecott
