= Governor of British Ceylon =

Colonial administrator

Governor of Ceylon
- Flag of Governor of Ceylon

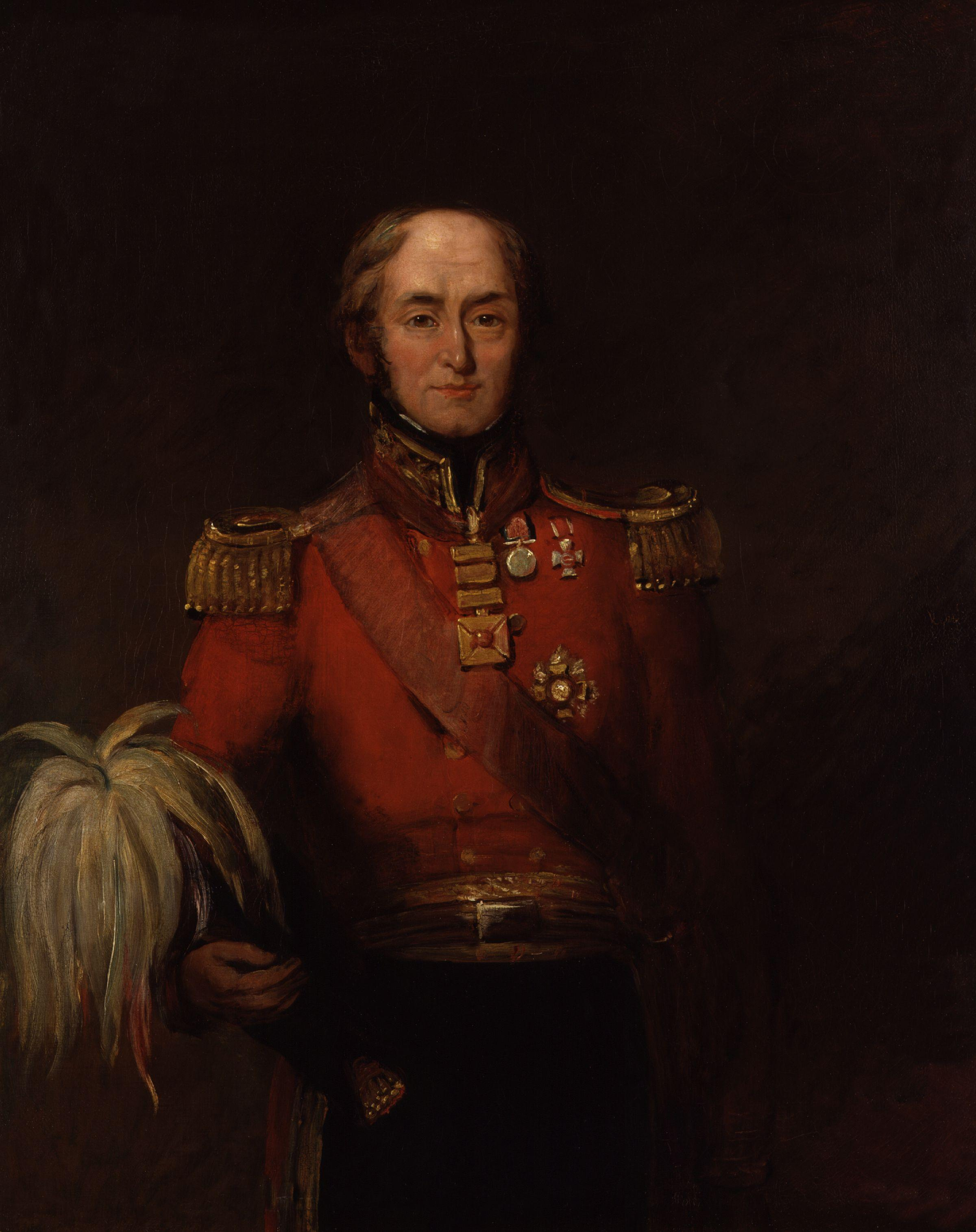
- Longest serving Edward Barnes; 1 February 1820–2 February 1822; 18 January 1824–13 October 1831
- Style: His Excellency
- Residence: Government House
- Appointer: Monarch of the United Kingdom
- Precursor: Governor of Ceylon
- Formation: August 1795
- First holder: Patrick Alexander Agnew as Military Governor
- Final holder: Henry Monck-Mason Moore
- Abolished: 4 February 1948
- Succession: Governor-General of Ceylon

The governor of Ceylon was the representative in Ceylon of the British Crown from 1795 to 1948. In this capacity, the governor was president of the Executive Council and Commander-in-Chief of the British Forces in Ceylon. The governor was the head of the British colonial administration in Ceylon, reporting to the Colonial Office.

With Ceylon gaining self-rule and dominion status with the creation of Dominion of Ceylon in 1948, this office was replaced by the Governor-General, who represented the British monarch as the head of state. The office of Governor-General was itself abolished in 1972 and replaced by the post of President when Sri Lanka became a republic.

== Appointment ==
The governor, appointed by the British monarch (on the advice of the prime minister and the secretary of state for the colonies), maintained executive power in Ceylon throughout British rule.

== Powers and functions ==
The governor was the head of the executive administration in the island. Initially limited to the coastal regions, the authority of the governor was extended to the provinces of the Kingdom of Kandy following the Kandyan Convention in 1815. The governor had absolute power in the island deriving it from the traditional powers of the Dutch governors and the king of Kandy and reporting to the secretary of state for the colonies. it was in the Colebrooke Reforms which first defined the role of the governor as "the representative of the Sovereign the Monarch who rules over the Parliament of the United Kingdom". These reforms introduced the first legislator which was expanded over the next century in the reforms that took place. Upon independence in 1948, the office of the Governor was abolished and replaced with that of the Governor-General as the representative of the sovereign.

The governor was the commander-in-chief of British Forces in Ceylon, except only during World War II, when Admiral Sir Geoffrey Layton was appointed Commander-in-Chief, Ceylon with power exceeding that of the governor.

=== Ceremonial ===
In November each year, the governor would receive the annual tribute from the sultan of Maldives. The governor was the ex-officio Chancellor of the University of Ceylon and patron of the Royal College Colombo.

== Council ==
Following the Colebrooke Reforms the Executive Council of Ceylon and the Legislative Council of Ceylon was established with the Governor chairing both these councils. In 1931, the Legislative Council was replaced by the State Council of Ceylon with limited self-government.

== Style and title ==
The title of the position was "Governor of Ceylon" and was styled Excellency and enjoyed precedence over all other government officials in Ceylon. He was referred to as 'His Excellency' and addressed as 'Your Excellency'. This practice as constituted to the office of President.

== Privileges ==
=== Residence ===
The governor's main residence and office was the King's House in Colombo and secondary residence was the King's Pavilion in Kandy. The vacationing residence of the governor, Queen's Cottage, was located in the hill station of Nuwara Eliya.

=== Guard ===
The Governor's Bodyguard was a mounted guard that functioned as a ceremonial guard for the governor when attending state functions. A ceremonial native regiment of Lascoreens was maintained by the office of the governor to provide a ceremonial guard on special occasions such as the Maldivian Tribute or royal visits.

== Staff ==
The governor's office was housed at King's House and had a permanent staff. It consisted of the secretary to the governor, a private secretary, an aide-de-camp, the maha mudaliyar, an office assistant and support staff.

== List of governors ==
Acting governor

No.	Portrait	Name (Birth–Death)	Term of office			Sovereign	Ref.
No.	Portrait	Name (Birth–Death)	Took office	Left office	Time in office	Sovereign	Ref.
Military Governors (1795–1798)
1		Patrick Alexander Agnew (1765–1813) (in Trincomalee)	31 August 1795	1 March 1796	183 days	George III	
2		James Stuart (1741–1815)	1 March 1796	1 January 1797	306 days	George III	
3		Welbore Ellis Doyle (1758–1797)	1 January 1797	2 July 1797	182 days	George III	
4		Peter Bonnevaux (c. 1752–1797)	2 July 1797	12 July 1797 †	10 days	George III	
5		Pierre Frédéric de Meuron (1788–1813)	12 July 1797	12 October 1798	1 year, 92 days	George III	
Resident and Superintendent (1796–1798)
1		Robert Andrews (1763–1821)	12 February 1796	12 October 1798	2 years, 242 days	George III	
Governors (1798–1948)
1		Frederick North (1766–1827)	12 October 1798	19 July 1805	6 years, 280 days	George III	
2		Thomas Maitland (1760–1824)	19 July 1805	19 March 1811	5 years, 243 days	George III	
		John Wilson (1780–1856); Acting	19 March 1811	11 March 1812	358 days	George III	
3		Robert Brownrigg (1759–1833)	11 March 1812	1 February 1820	7 years, 327 days	George III	
		Edward Barnes (1776–1838); Acting	1 February 1820	2 February 1822	2 years, 1 day	George III; George IV	
4		Edward Paget (1775–1849)	2 February 1822	6 November 1822	277 days	George IV	
		James Campbell (c. 1773–1835); Acting	6 November 1822	18 January 1824	1 year, 73 days	George IV	
5		Edward Barnes (1776–1838)	18 January 1824	13 October 1831	7 years, 268 days	George IV; William IV	
		John Wilson (1780–1856); Acting	13 October 1831	23 October 1831	10 days	William IV	
6		Robert Wilmot-Horton (1784–1841)	23 October 1831	7 November 1837	6 years, 15 days	William IV; Queen Victoria	
7		James Alexander Stewart-Mackenzie (1784–1843)	7 November 1837	15 April 1841	3 years, 159 days	Queen Victoria	
8		Colin Campbell (1776–1847)	15 April 1841	19 April 1847	6 years, 4 days	Queen Victoria	
		James Emerson Tennent (1804–1869); Acting	19 April 1847	29 May 1847	40 days	Queen Victoria	
9		George Byng, 7th Viscount Torrington (1812–1884)	29 May 1847	18 October 1850	3 years, 142 days	Queen Victoria	
		Charles Justin MacCarthy (1811–1864); Acting	18 October 1850	27 November 1850	40 days	Queen Victoria	
10		George William Anderson (1791–1857)	27 November 1850	18 January 1855	4 years, 52 days	Queen Victoria	
		Charles Justin MacCarthy (1811–1864); Acting	18 January 1855	11 May 1855	113 days	Queen Victoria	
11		Henry George Ward (1797–1860)	11 May 1855	30 June 1860	5 years, 50 days	Queen Victoria	
		Henry Frederick Lockyer (1797–1860); Acting	30 June 1860	30 July 1860	30 days	Queen Victoria	
		Charles Edmund Wilkinson (1807–1870); Acting	30 July 1860	22 October 1860	84 days	Queen Victoria	
12		Charles Justin MacCarthy (1811–1864)	22 October 1860	1 December 1863	3 years, 40 days	Queen Victoria	
		Terence O'Brien (died 1865); Acting	1 December 1863	21 March 1865	1 year, 110 days	Queen Victoria	
		Hercules Robinson (1824–1897); Acting	21 March 1865	16 May 1865	56 days	Queen Victoria	
13		Hercules Robinson (1824–1897)	16 May 1865	4 January 1872	6 years, 233 days	Queen Victoria	
		Henry Turner Irving (1833–1923); Acting	4 January 1872	4 March 1872	60 days	Queen Victoria	
14		William Henry Gregory (1817–1892)	4 March 1872	4 September 1877	5 years, 184 days	Queen Victoria	
15		James Robert Longden (1827–1891)	4 September 1877	10 July 1883	5 years, 309 days	Queen Victoria	
		John Douglas (1835–1885); Acting	10 July 1883	3 December 1883	146 days	Queen Victoria	
16		Arthur Hamilton-Gordon (1829–1912)	3 December 1883	28 May 1890	6 years, 176 days	Queen Victoria	
17		Arthur Elibank Havelock (1844–1908)	28 May 1890	24 October 1895	5 years, 149 days	Queen Victoria	
		Edward Noël Walker (1842–1908); Acting	24 October 1895	10 February 1896	109 days	Queen Victoria	
18		Joseph West Ridgeway (1844–1930)	10 February 1896	19 November 1903	7 years, 282 days	Queen Victoria; Edward VII	
		Sir Everard im Thurn (1852–1932); Acting	19 November 1903	3 December 1903	14 days	Edward VII	
19		Henry Arthur Blake (1840–1918)	3 December 1903	11 July 1907	3 years, 220 days	Edward VII	
		Hugh Clifford (1866–1941); Acting	11 July 1907	24 August 1907	44 days	Edward VII	
20		Henry Edward McCallum (1852–1919)	24 August 1907	24 January 1913	5 years, 153 days	Edward VII; George V	
		Reginald Edward Stubbs (1876–1947); Acting	24 January 1913	18 October 1913	267 days	George V	
21		Robert Chalmers (1858–1938)	18 October 1913	4 December 1915	2 years, 47 days	George V	
		Reginald Edward Stubbs (1876–1947); Acting	4 December 1915	15 April 1916	133 days	George V	
22		John Anderson (1858–1918)	15 April 1916	24 March 1918 †	1 year, 343 days	George V	
		Reginald Edward Stubbs (1876–1947); Acting	24 March 1918	10 September 1918	170 days	George V	
23		William Henry Manning (1863–1932)	10 September 1918	1 April 1925	6 years, 203 days	George V	
		Cecil Clementi (1875–1947); Acting	1 April 1925	18 October 1925	200 days	George V	
		Edward Bruce Alexander (1872–1955); Acting	18 October 1925	30 November 1925	43 days	George V	
24		Hugh Clifford (1866–1941)	30 November 1925	June 1927	1 year, 6 months	George V	
		Arthur George Murchison Fletcher (1878–1954); Acting	June 1927	20 August 1928	1 year, 2 months	George V	
25		Herbert Stanley (1872–1955)	20 August 1928	11 February 1931	2 years, 175 days	George V	
		Bernard Henry Bourdillon (1883–1948); Acting	11 February 1931	11 April 1931	59 days	George V	
26		Graeme Thomson (1875–1933)	11 April 1931	20 September 1933	2 years, 162 days	George V	
		Graeme Tyrrell (1876–1964); Acting	20 September 1933	23 December 1933	94 days	George V	
27		Reginald Edward Stubbs (1876–1947)	23 December 1933	30 June 1937	3 years, 189 days	George V Edward VIII; George VI	
		Maxwell MacLagan Wedderburn (1883–1953); Acting	30 June 1937	16 October 1937	108 days	George VI	
28		Andrew Caldecott (1884–1951)	16 October 1937	19 September 1944	6 years, 339 days	George VI	
29		Henry Monck-Mason Moore (1887–1964)	19 September 1944	4 February 1948	3 years, 138 days	George VI	

== See also ==
- Dutch governors of Zeylan
- Governor-General of Ceylon
- History of Sri Lanka
