= Lushington =

Lushington is a surname. Notable people with the surname include:

- Edmund Law Lushington (1811–1883), English academic
- Henry Lushington (1812–1855), English colonial administrator, chief secretary to the government of Malta
- Charles Manners Lushington (1819–1864), MP for Canterbury
- Franklin Lushington (1823–1901), British judge and friend of Edward Lear
- Godfrey Lushington (1832–1907), British civil servant and advocate of prison reform
- Vernon Lushington (1832–1912), British judge and civil servant
- Alfred Wyndham Lushington (1860–1920), Anglo-Indian botanist
- Augustus Nathaniel Lushington (b. 1869), first African American to earn a Doctorate of Veterinary Medicine
- Susan Lushington (1870–1953), British musician and promoter of music, daughter of Venon
- Kate Lushington, Canadian theatre artist and teacher
- Stephen Lushington (disambiguation), several people

== See also ==
- Lushington Baronets
- Lushington Falls
