= Edmund Lushington =

Edmund Lushington may refer to:

- Edmund Law Lushington, British classical scholar
- Edmund Henry Lushington, Chief Justice of Ceylon
