= William Norris =

William Norris or Norreys may refer to:

== Law and politics ==
- William Norris (1501–68) (1501–1568), English politician, Member of Parliament for Liverpool
- William Norreys (Berkshire MP) (c. 1548–1579), English politician and soldier; Member of Parliament for Berkshire
- Sir William Norris, 1st Baronet (c. 1658–1702), English politician, Member of Parliament for Liverpool
- Sir William Norris (judge) (1795–1859), English jurist, Chief Justice of British Ceylon, father of William Edward Norris
- William Albert Norris (1927–2017), American jurist, judge for the United States Court of Appeals for the Ninth Circuit
- William Norris III (1936–2016), American judge

== Military ==
- William Norreys (c.1441–1507), English Lancastrian soldier during the War of the Roses
- William Hutchinson Norris (1800–1893), American military officer and politician who founded the city of Americana in Brazil
- William Norris (Confederate signal officer) (1820–1896)
- William C. Norris (general) (1926–2024), United States Air Force general

== Other ==
- William Norris (antiquarian) (1719–1791), English clergyman and antiquarian
- William Norris (locomotive builder) (1802–1867), American steam locomotive builder
- William Norris (English cricketer) (1830–1889), English clergyman and cricketer
- William Edward Norris (1847–1925), British author
- William Foxley Norris (1859–1937), English clergyman, Dean of York
- William Norris (Wellington cricketer) (1908–1988), New Zealand cricketer
- William Norris (CEO) (1911–2006), American business executive, CEO of Control Data Corporation
