= Alexander Johnston (1775–1849) =

Chief Justice of British Ceylon, 1811-1819

Sir Alexander Johnston
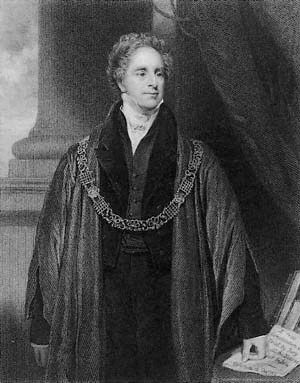

3rd Chief Justice of Ceylon
- In office 6 November 1811 – 1819
- Governor: John Wilson
- Preceded by: William Coke; As Acting
- Succeeded by: Ambrose Hardinge Giffard

Puisne Justice of the Supreme Court of Ceylon
- In office 1807–1811

Acting Chief Justice of Ceylon
- In office 3 April 1806 – 5 April 1807
- Preceded by: Codrington Edmund Carrington
- Succeeded by: Edmund Henry Lushington; As Acting

2nd Advocate Fiscal of Ceylon
- In office 7 August 1802 – 1806
- Preceded by: James Dunkin
- Succeeded by: James Dunkin

Personal details
- Born: Carnsalloch, Dumfriesshire, Scotland
- Died: 6 March 1849 London, United Kingdom
- Occupation: British privy councillor, founder and vice-president of the Royal Asiatic Society, lawyer, colonial official
- Known for: being the Chief Justice of Ceylon and founder of Royal Asiatic Society

Sir Alexander Johnston, PC, FRS (died 6 March 1849), was a British colonial official who served as third Chief Justice of Ceylon and second Advocate Fiscal of Ceylon. He introduced a range of administrative reforms in Sri Lanka, introducing numerous liberal ideas and supporting the rights of natives. He was also an orientalist and along with Henry Thomas Colebrooke and others he was a founding member of the Royal Asiatic Society of Great Britain and Ireland.

== Early life ==
Johnston was born in Carnsalloch, Dumfriesshire in Scotland to Samuel Johnston and Hester Napier, daughter of Francis Napier, 6th Lord Napier. Johnston moved with his family when his father obtained a posting in Madurai under Lord Macartney in the Madras Presidency in 1781. Alexander received his early education from Christian Friedrich Schwarz, the missionary as well as under Sir Thomas Munro. He could speak Tamil, Telugu, and Hindustani languages from an early age.

== Colonial career ==
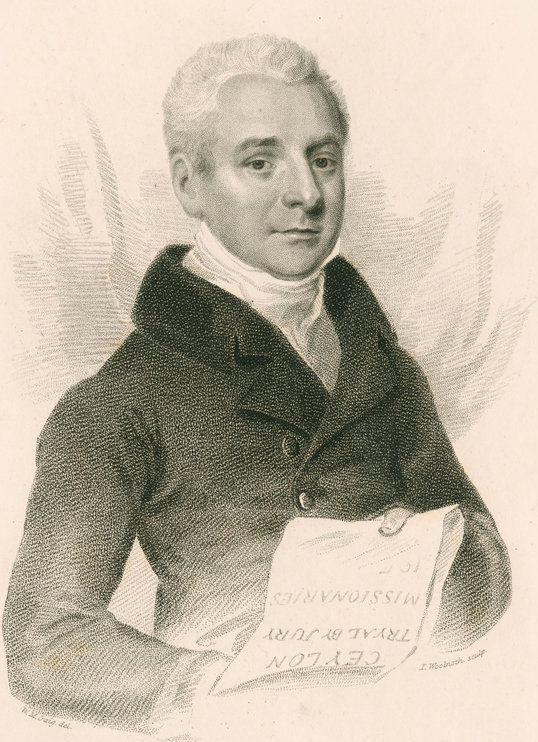
Portrait of Johnston

At the age of eleven, Alexander was offered a commission in the Dragoons but he chose instead to join the family to return to England in 1792. At the advice of Lord Macartney he studied law, initially at Göttingen and then at Lincoln's Inn. In 1799 he accepted a post as Advocate General in Ceylon in 1799 shortly after his marriage to Louisa Campbell (1766–1852), the daughter of Captain Lord William Campbell of the Royal Navy. He became a chief justice in 1805 and in 1809 he was asked to provide suggestions for the administration of Ceylon, many of which were included in the charter for the East India Company in 1813. He was knighted in 1811 and by 1817 he took up an honorary position as an admiralty judge.

Johnston was responsible for bringing the Mahavamsa, Sri Lanka's historical epic, to European attention when he sent manuscripts of it and other Sinhala chronicles to Europe for publication during his tenure as Chief Justice. Jonhston encouraged the translation of the Mahavamsa and other works in order to bring British colonial law into alignment with local traditions and values.

The reforms that Sir Alexander Johnston made included universal public education, freedom of religious practice, abolishment of slavery, employment of natives in government, and the codification of laws including the traditional views of Hindus, Muslims, and Buddhists.

Johnston returned to England in 1819.

== Retirement ==
Johnston stood as a liberal representing the Dumfries burghs in 1840 but failed. After retirement Johnston founded the Royal Asiatic Society. He died on 6 March 1849 at London and was buried at Carnsalloch, Dumfriesshire.

== Personal ==
His son Alexander Robert Johnston was a colonial official in Mauritius and Hong Kong before going to England (and died in the United States in 1888).

Legal offices
Preceded by William Coke; As Acting	Chief Justice of Ceylon; 1811–1819	Succeeded by Ambrose Hardinge Giffard
Preceded by	Puisne Justice of the Supreme Court of Ceylon; 1807–1811	Succeeded by
Preceded by Codrington Edmund Carrington	Acting; Chief Justice of Ceylon; 1806–1807	Succeeded by Edmund Henry Lushington
Preceded by James Dunkin	Advocate Fiscal of Ceylon; 1802–1806	Succeeded by James Dunkin
