= William Beltran =

French–American ophthalmologist

Academic background
- Education: DVM, 1994, École nationale vétérinaire d'Alfort; PhD, 2006, Cornell University
- Thesis: Cellular and molecular studies of ciliary neurotrophic factor receptor alpha expression and ciliary neurotrophic factor mediated neuroprotection in the canine retina (2006)

Academic work
- Institutions: University of Pennsylvania School of Veterinary Medicine

William Anthony Beltran is a French–American ophthalmologist. He is a professor of ophthalmology in the Department of Clinical Sciences and Advanced Medicine and director of the Division of Experimental Retinal Therapies at the University of Pennsylvania School of Veterinary Medicine. In 2020, Beltran was elected a Member of the National Academy of Medicine for his research focus on inherited retinal degeneration.

== Early life and education ==
Beltran was raised in Colombia and France while also spending his summers in Provence. He completed his Doctor of Veterinary Medicine at the École nationale vétérinaire d'Alfort in 1994 before moving to North America for his PhD at Cornell University.

== Career ==
Following his PhD, Beltran followed Gustavo Aguirre to the University of Pennsylvania School of Veterinary Medicine (Penn Vet) and participated in his laboratory on retinal neuroprotection. While working alongside Aguirre, Beltran received the 2004 Foundation Career Development Award before joining the faculty at Penn Vet in 2006 as an assistant professor of ophthalmology. As an assistant professor, Beltran continued to collaborate Aguirre while focusing his research on therapies for retinitis pigmentosa. Together, they developed gene therapies to treat canine models of achromatopsia, Vitelliform macular dystrophy, and forms of retinitis pigmentosa. Following this, Beltran co-authored a study which discovered new features in canine eyes that had the potential to improve treatments for blinding retinal diseases in humans.

As a result of his research into inherited blinding disorders, Beltran received the 2016 ARVO Foundation's Pfizer Ophthalmics Carl Camras Translational Research Award. The award recognized his work investigating the signaling pathways affected by X-linked retinitis pigmentosa. In 2020, Beltran was elected a Member of the National Academy of Medicine for his research focus on inherited retinal degeneration. He was specifically recognized for helping to develop gene therapies for treating both early- and late-stage inherited retinal degeneration. The following year, Beltran was awarded funding from Fighting Blindness Canada to continue his research into cell replacement therapy for retinitis pigmentosa.
