= David Hopkin (magistrate) =

British magistrate

Sir David Hopkin

Chief Metropolitan Stipendiary Magistrate
- In office 5 April 1982 – July 1992
- Preceded by: Sir Evelyn Russell
- Succeeded by: Sir Peter Badge

Sir David Armand Hopkin (10 January 1922 – 21 August 1997) was a British barrister, magistrate, and boxing administrator. He was Chief Metropolitan Stipendiary Magistrate from 1982 to 1992, Chairman of the British Boxing Board of Control from 1983 to 1993, and President of the same body from 1991 until 1997.

The son of Welsh Labour politician Daniel Hopkin, also sometime a Metropolitan Stipendiary magistrate, and of Edmée Hopkin, David Hopkin was educated at St Paul's School, London, University College, Aberystwyth, and Corpus Christi College, Cambridge, where he read Modern Languages. He served in the British Army from 1942 to 1947, first in the Intelligence Corps, then in the Pioneer Corps, supervising Italian prisoners of war in Egypt. He attained the rank of honorary major.

After being called to the bar by Gray's Inn in 1949, Hopkin joined the staff of the Director of Public Prosecutions in 1950, where he remained until 1970, rising to become deputy director of Public Prosecutions. Among the notable cases with which he was involved was the prosecution of the Richardson brothers and of Frankie Fraser in 1965 and of the Kray twins in 1968.

He was appointed a Metropolitan Stipendiary Magistrate in 1970, and in 1982 he became Chief Metropolitan Stipendiary Magistrate, receiving the customary knighthood in 1987. He retired in July 1992; at time, he was the longest-serving Chief Metropolitan Stipendiary Magistrate in modern times.

Hopkin was involved with boxing administration since the 1950s, when he was invited to join the Southern Area Council of the British Boxing Board of Control by the boxing promoter Jack Solomons. As chairman and president of the Board of Control, he campaigned for the standardisation of boxing regulations and the reform of the constitution of the European Boxing Union.
