= Utuwankande Sura Saradiel =

Ceylonese gang leader

- උතුවන්කන්දේ සුර සරදියෙල්
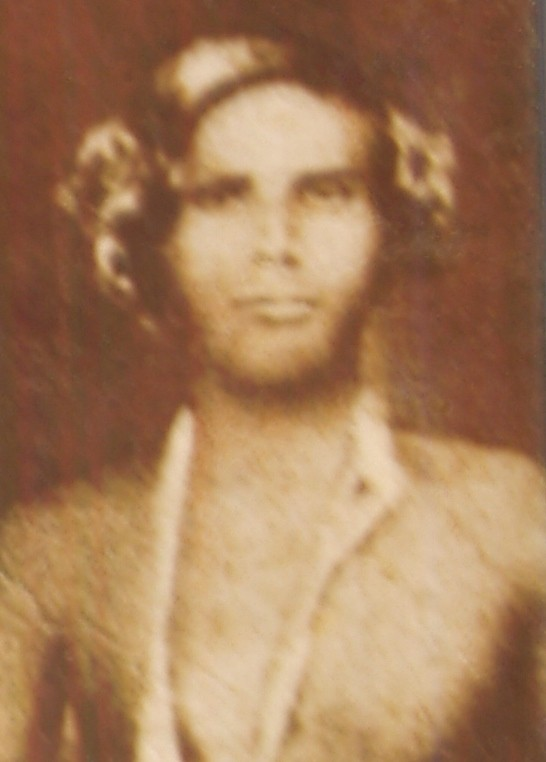
- Saradiel after taken into Custody in 1864.
- Born: Deekirikevage Saradiel; 25 March 1832; Kegalle District
- Died: 7 May 1864 (aged 32); Bogambara Prison, Kandy
- Cause of death: Executed by the British on the gallows
- Citizenship: British Ceylon
- Education: Beligammana Temple; Ilukgoda Temple
- Occupation(s): Outlaw, Robbery
- Partner(s): Mamale Marikkar; Mahammudu Sawath; Nasardeen; Sirimala; Ukkinda; Modara Tanne Henda
- Parents: Adasi Appu (father); Pichohamy (mother)

Deekirikevage Saradiel called Utuwankande Sura Saradiel, translation:Saradiel the Hero of Mountain Utuwan (Sinhala: උතුවන්කන්දේ සුර සරදියෙල්; 25 March 1832 – 7 May 1864) was a Ceylonese gang leader and bandit who became known as the "Robin Hood of Sri Lanka". Some Sri Lankan scholars place him in the context of regional insurgencies of against British Colonial rule rather than a manifestation of local lawlessness or economic justice. Due to superstition he was believed to have the power of not being seen and that he was bullet proof. Many believe that this is because he had Henaraja "yantra" on his arm which lent him such powers.

== Outlaw ==
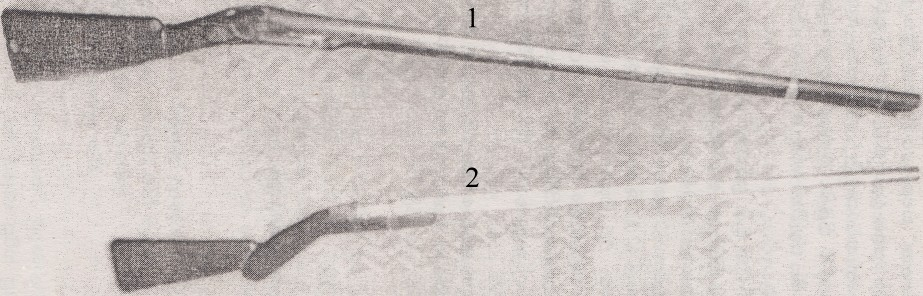
Gunpowder firearms used By Uthuwankande Sura Saradiel & his mate Mammale Marikkar 1-Firearm used by Mammale Marikkar 2-Firearm used by Uthuwankande Sura Saradiel

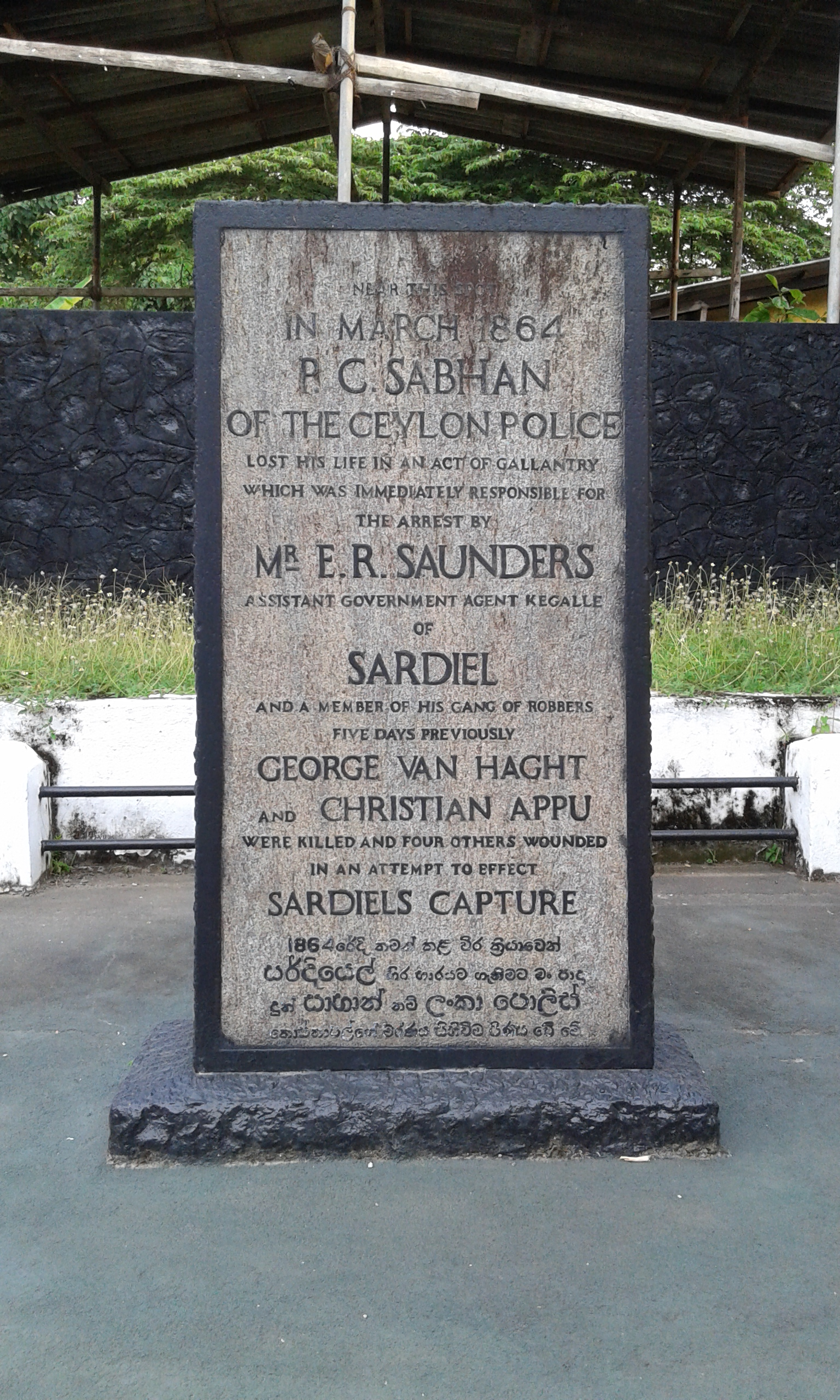
Constable Sabhan Memorial Mawanella.

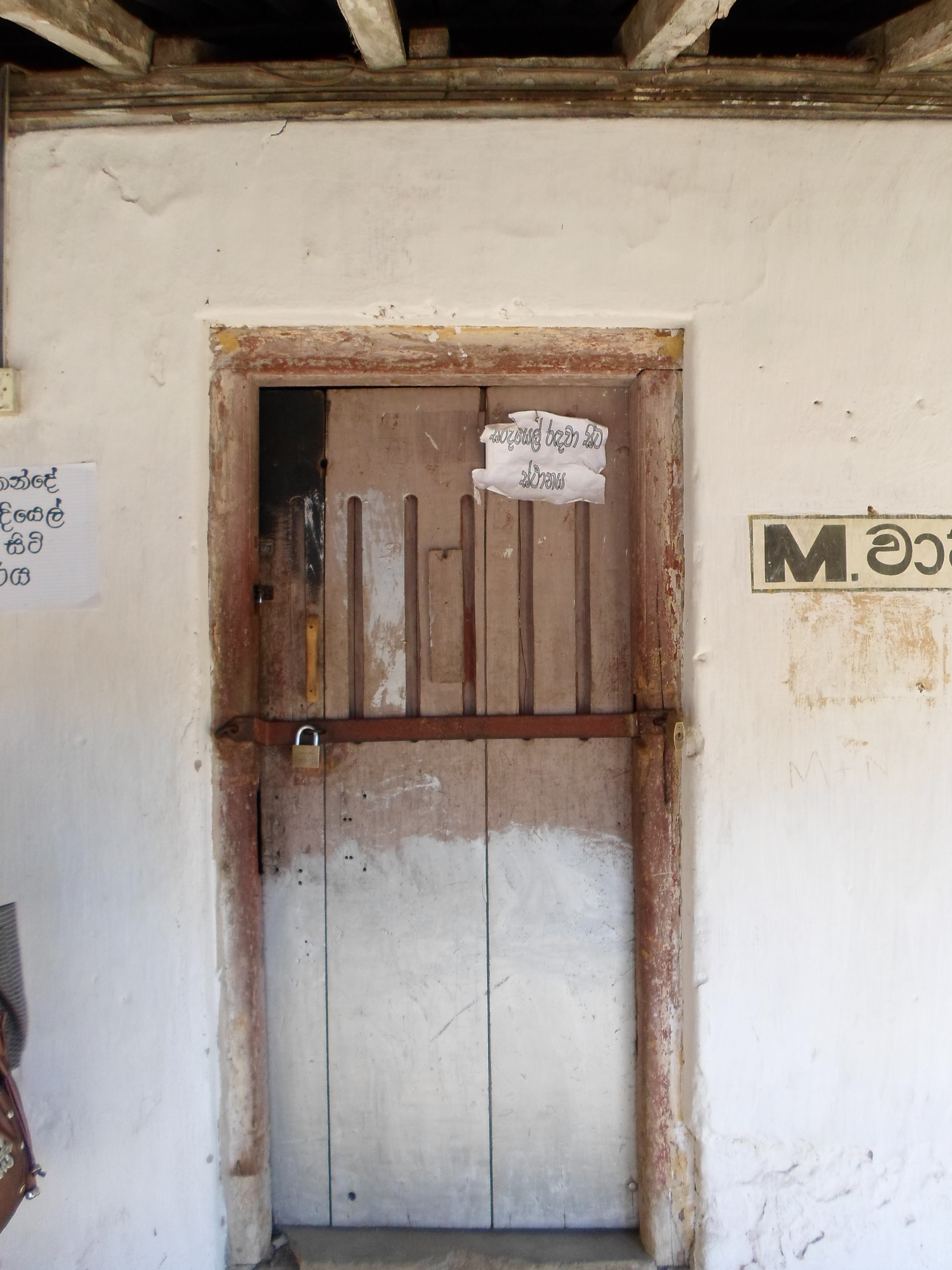
The Prison Cell of Utuwankande Sura Saradiel.

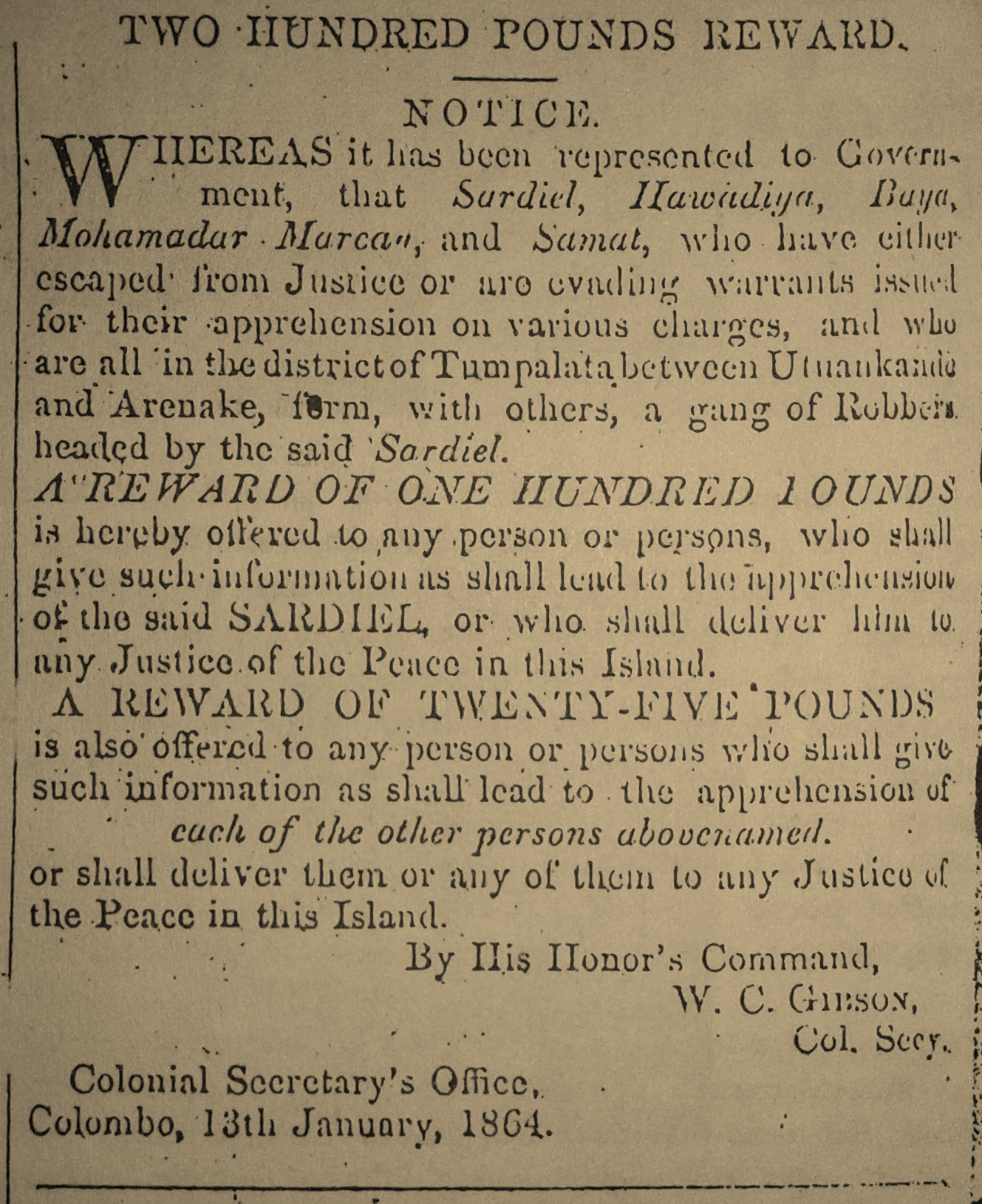
Arrest Warrant Reward Notice (Ceylon Gazette 13th Jan 1864)

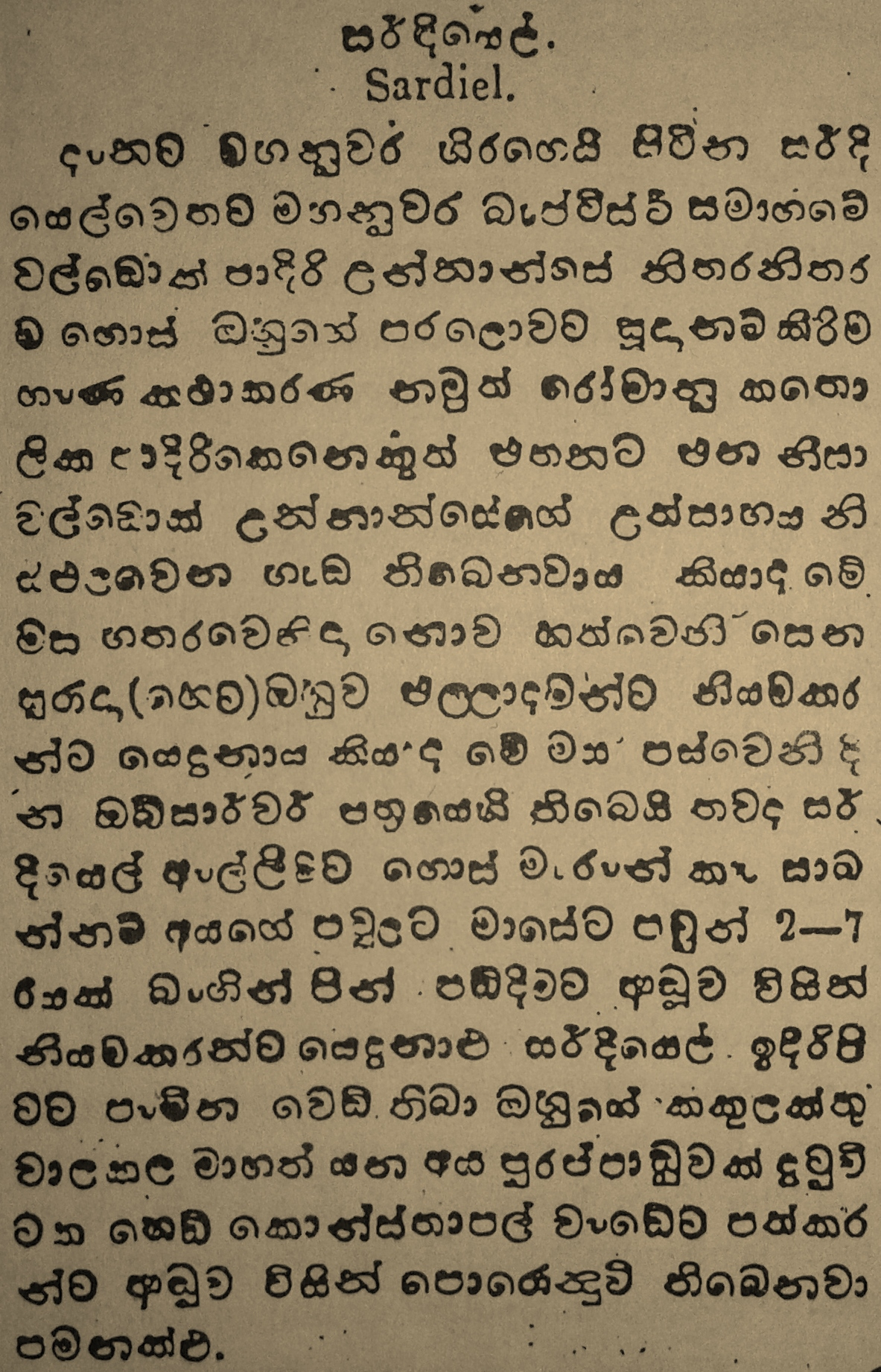
Lakrivikirana Paper (06th May 1864) on Sura Saradiel.

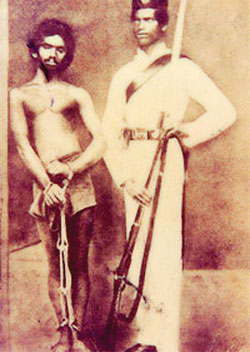
Sura Saradiel's lifelong friend Mammale Marikkar after taken into Custody in 1864.

Saradiel briefly took to thievery, distributing his stolen items amongst the poor villagers. However he left the area to Colombo and worked as a barrack boy at the Rifle Barracks, learning much about weapons before leaving, taking several firearms with him.

Thereafter he took to highway robbery, becoming a notable outlaw in the district for much of his exploits. Charges were brought on him for killing Natakoti Chettiar, who was a rich merchant and he was arrested. Due to a lack of evidence, he was set free. A warrant for his arrest was issued after a robbery at the Molligoda Walauwa. He then briefly left the area, going to his father's in Chilaw. When his father refused to shelter him, he returned to the mountain of Utuwankande, which he had made his hideout for numerous raids.

He was arrested at Pillawatte near Negombo after a struggle that led to the police informant being stabbed by him. Saradiel was taken to court in Hultsdorf, Colombo to stand trial for murder, yet he managed to escape from Mahara Prison. Soon after he was arrested at Utuwankande only to escape again.

Returning to Utuwankande hill in Mawanella he formed a gang of robbers, made raids on carriages and coaches on the highway to Kandy from Colombo. Soon these attacks spread to Rambukkana, Polgahawela and Kurunegala. Resulting in his exploits becoming famous throughout the island and the British administrators increasing the police units in the area. Travellers resorted to armed escorts.

In an effort to capture him he was surrounded at his mother's home, when he went to visit her. In the shootout that ensued he escaped and made his way to Matale. At this point Sirimale, one of Saradiel's band defected and became an informant to the police.

== Final arrest and execution ==
On 21 March 1864 he was drawn to a house in Mawanella. On a tip off, a police party surrounded the house. They found Saradiel there with Mammalay Marikkar. Sgt. Ahamath fired at Saradiel first and wounded him; Mammalay Marikkar fired killing Constable Shaban. Escaping from the house, Sgt. Ahamath stood guard outside the only door, preventing the bandits' escape. The Assistant Government Agent Kegalle F.R. Saunders soon arrived on the scene with a detachment of Ceylon Rifles. Seeing that resistance was futile, the two surrendered.

Taken to Kandy, they were tried at Kandy Assize by an English-speaking jury before Justice Henry Byerley Thomson, with Richard Morgan prosecuting as crown advocate. The jury found them guilty: Both were sentenced to death. They were taken to the gallows on 7 May 1864, with many coming to see the famed Saradiel. Before his execution he addressed the crowd. A folk lore to the effect that a letter from the Queen Victoria, which accidentally read: 'kill him, not let him go', when it was supposed to be: 'kill him not, let him go', was misinterpreted and he was sentenced to death; is fake.

== Legacy ==
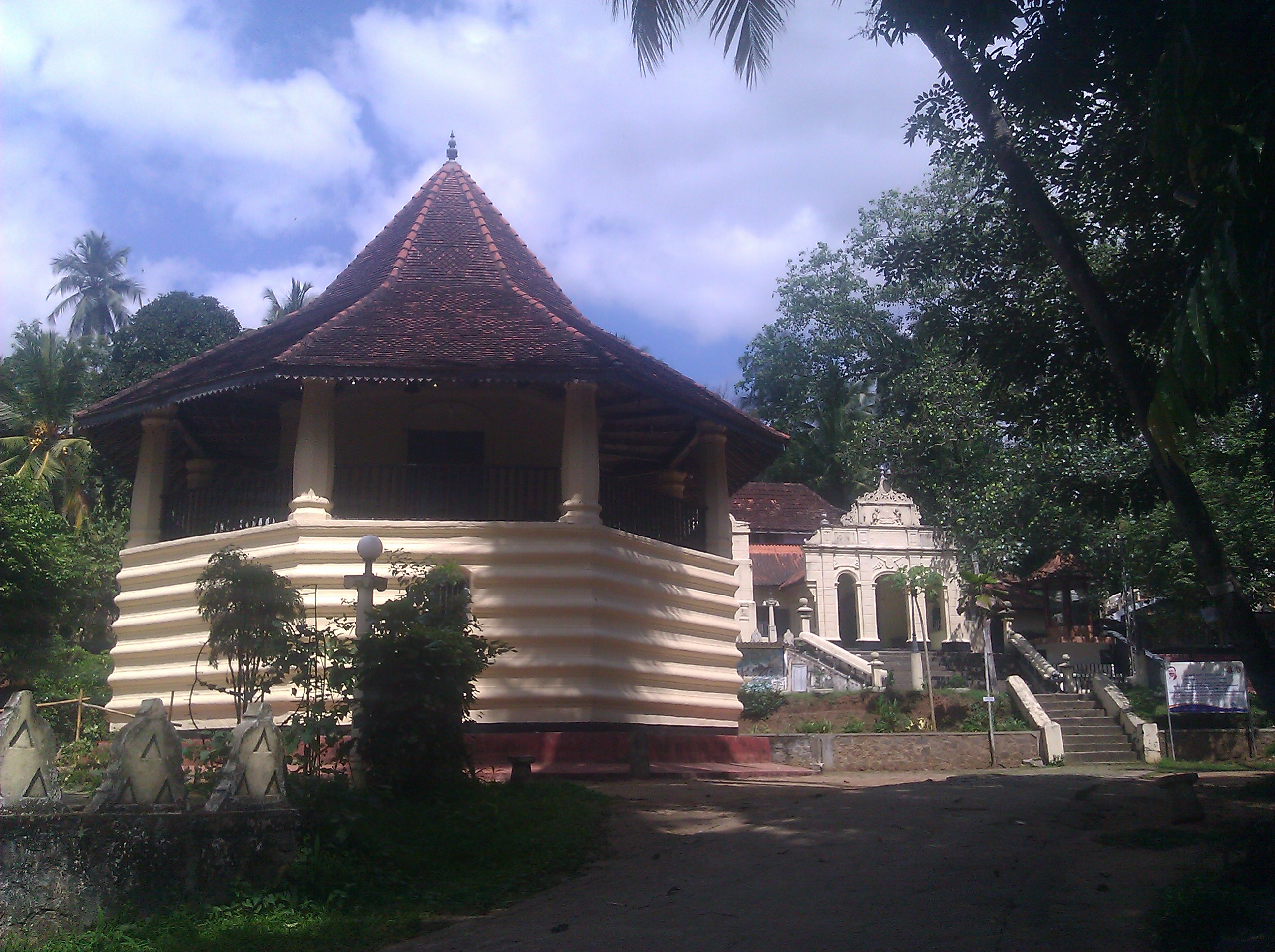
Beligammana Raja Maha Viharaya, one of the temples where Sura Saradiel studied when younger.

Saradiel distributed much of his plunder among the poor, and never stole from them. Due to this he was referred to as the "Robin Hood of Sri Lanka", most of his raids were targeting British and their native supporters, who had gained wealth as the lower and medium levels of the colonial administration, he gained popularity among the poor villagers who were opposed to the British. As a result, many consider his actions just and a Saradiel rebel against British rule rather than a bandit.

Constable Shaban was killed on 21 March 1864 in the attempt to apprehend Saradiel, and was the first Ceylonese policeman to be killed in the line of duty. March 21 is when fallen Sri Lanka Police are commemorated.

His brother was the sculptor of Saint Joseph on the facade of St Joseph's Church Wennappuwa.

== See also ==
- Robin Hood
- Jesse James
- Ned Kelly
