= Arthur Buller =

Arthur Buller may refer to:

- Arthur William Buller (1808–1869), British politician
- Arthur Henry Reginald Buller (1874–1944), British-Canadian botanist
