= Albert de Rutzen =

British judge

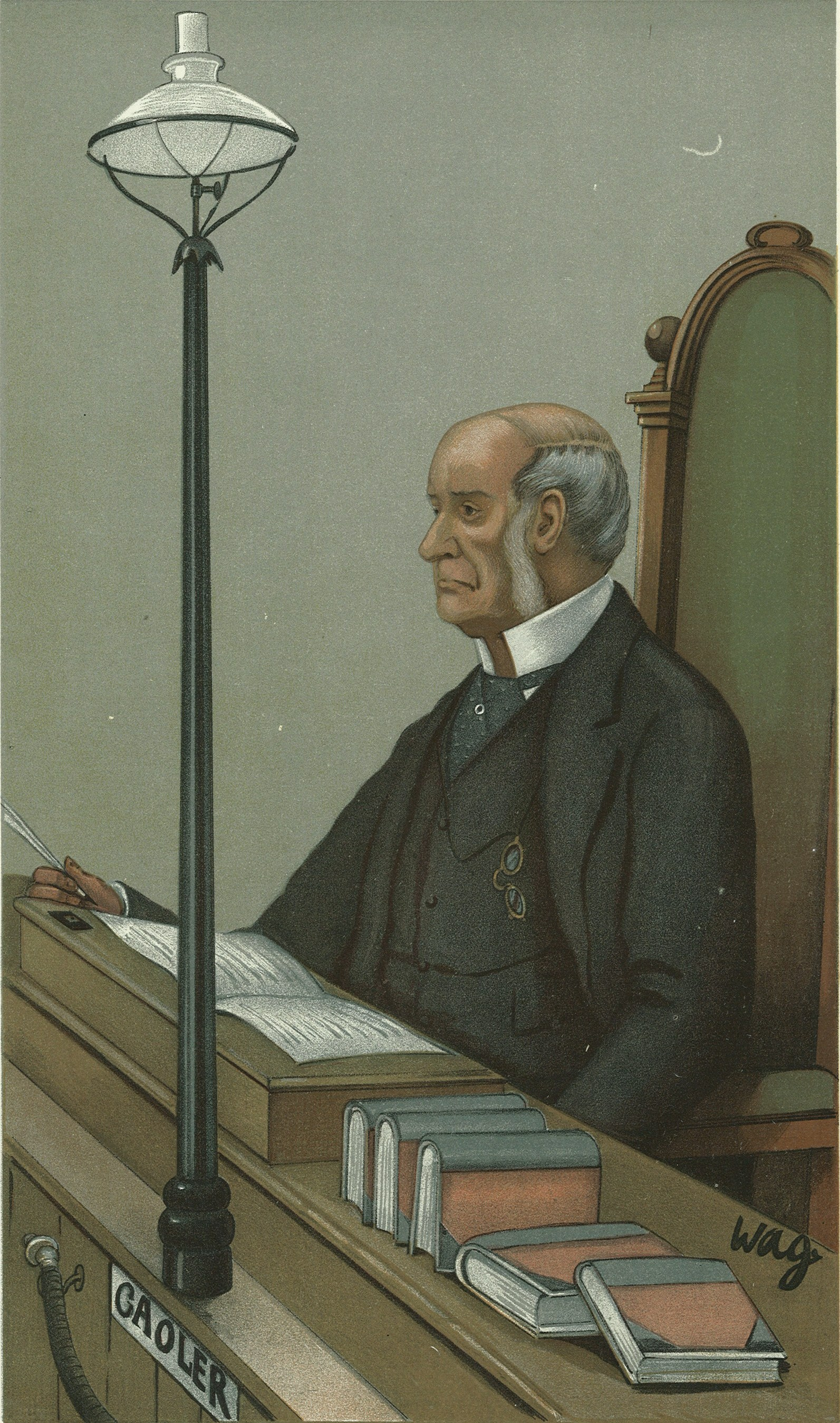
Vanity Fair caricature by "Wag" (Arthur George Witherby), 1900.

Sir Albert de Rutzen was chief magistrate of the Metropolitan Police Courts in the United Kingdom. He was knighted in 1901.

De Rutzen was born Albert Richard Francis Maximilian De Rutzen, the son of Baron Charles Frederick De Rutzen (1795-1874), in 1830. He was born in Pall Mall, London.

De Rutzen was stipendiary magistrate of Merthyr Tydfil in Wales from 1872 to 1876. He became a Metropolitan Police magistrate in London in 1876 to 1913, becoming Chief Magistrate in 1901, when he was knighted.

In 1910, de Rutzen issued the arrest warrant for Dr Crippen and his mistress Ethel Le Neve, for the murder of Crippen's wife. Crippen and Le Neve were on a ship to Canada were arrested on their arrival in Quebec. Crippen was convicted and executed and Le Neve was acquitted.

In 1872, de Rutzen married Horatia Augusta Stepney Gulston (1840-1924) of Carmarthenshire, the daughter of magistrate Alan James Gulston. They had five children together: Emmeline Augusta Louisa (b. 1873), Gwendoline Mary (b.1875), and Alan Frederick James (b.1876), who were all born in Carmarthenshire, and two children born in London: Alberta Dorothea (b.1877) and Violet Frances (b.1881). Sir Albert De Rutzen died in London on 22 September 1913, aged 83.
