= Attorney General of Sri Lanka =

Sri Lankan government's chief legal officer

- Incumbent; Parinda Ranasinghe Jr. since 12 July 2024 (Acting: 1 July – 12 July 2024)
- Attorney General's Department
- Style: The Honourable
- Nominator: President of Sri Lanka
- Appointer: The president; with Constitutional Council advice and consent
- Term length: No fixed term
- Formation: February 19, 1801; 225 years ago
- First holder: James Dunkin as Advocate Fiscal of Ceylon
- Deputy: Solicitor General of Sri Lanka
- Website: www.attorneygeneral.gov.lk

The attorney general of Sri Lanka is the Sri Lankan government's chief legal adviser, and its primary lawyer in the Supreme Court of Sri Lanka. The attorney general is usually a highly respected senior advocate, and is appointed by the ruling government. The current attorney general is Parinda Ranasinghe Jnr. The president does not have any power to make orders, mandatory or otherwise, to the attorney general. He heads the Attorney General's Department which is the public prosecutor.

Unlike the attorney general of the United States, the attorney general of Sri Lanka does not have any executive authority and is not a political appointee; those functions are performed by the minister of justice. The attorney general is assisted by the solicitor general of Sri Lanka and several additional solicitors general.

== Appointment ==
Under section 54 of the Constitution of Sri Lanka, the president of Sri Lanka appoints the attorney general on advice of the government. The general practice is the serving solicitor general succeeds the outgoing attorney general. However, there have been instances where exceptions have been made.

Under the 17th Amendment and 19th Amendment to the Constitution, the attorney general along with the chief justice, the judges of the Supreme Court and the Court of Appeal, the members of the Judicial Service Commission, and four other officials are placed in a constitutionally guaranteed position of security from removal from office.

== Powers and duties ==
The powers and duties of the attorney general are derived from the Administration of Justice Law, No. 44 of 1973 and the Code of Criminal Procedure Act.

== Salary and entitlements ==
Traditionally the attorney general is addressed by the honorific The Honourable. The attorney general draws a monthly salary and pensionable allowance (as at 2017) of Rs 240,000 and other allowances of 332,800. He/she is entitled to an official vehicle and an official residence or an allowance of Rs 50,000 in place of such. Further a books allowance of Rs 30,000 and allowance for not engaging in private practice of Rs 150,000 is provided. The position is pensionable, and holders are entitled to government duty free permits.

== List of attorneys general ==
Data based on:

- Amerasinghe, A. Ranjit B. (1986), The Supreme Court of Sri Lanka: the first 185 years, Sarvodaya

#	Attorney General	Province	Took office	Left office	Appointed by
Advocate Fiscal of Ceylon (1801–1833)
1	James Dunkin		19 February 1801	1802	Frederick North
2	Alexander Johnston	Scotland	7 August 1802	1806	Frederick North
3	James Dunkin		22 April 1806	1808	Thomas Maitland
4	William Coke	England	5 September 1808	1811	Thomas Maitland
5	Ambrose Hardinge Giffard	Ireland	26 February 1811	1821	Thomas Maitland
6	Henry Matthews		1 November 1821	1829	Edward Barnes
7	William Norris		28 February 1829	1833	Edward Barnes
King's Advocate of Ceylon (1833–1838)
8	William Ogle Carr	England	2 April 1833	1838	Robert Wilmot-Horton
Queen's Advocate of Ceylon (1838–1884)
9	John Stark		10 December 1838	1840	James Alexander Stewart-Mackenzie
10	Arthur William Buller		17 October 1840	1848	James Alexander Stewart-Mackenzie
11	Henry Collingwood Selby		23 June 1848	1858	George Byng
12	Henry Byerley Thomson		3 May 1858	1863	Henry George Ward
13	Richard Morgan		1 January 1863	1876	Charles Justin MacCarthy
14	Richard Cayley	England	4 April 1876	1879	William Henry Gregory
15	Bruce Burnside	Bahamas	24 October 1879	1883	James Robert Longden
16	Francis Fleming		4 July 1883	1884	James Robert Longden
Attorney General of Ceylon (1884–1972)
16	Francis Fleming		1 January 1884	1886	Arthur Hamilton-Gordon
17	Samuel Grenier		30 September 1886	1892	Arthur Hamilton-Gordon
18	Charles Layard	Western	1 November 1892	1902	Arthur Havelock
19	Alfred Lascelles	England	18 June 1902	1911	Joseph West Ridgeway
20	Anton Bertram		18 May 1911	1918	Henry McCallum
21	Henry Gollan		15 October 1918	1924	John Anderson
22	Lancelot Henry Elphinstone		6 October 1924	1929	William Manning
23	Edward St. John Jackson		12 May 1929	1936	Herbert Stanley
24	John Curtois Howard		27 July 1936	1936	Reginald Edward Stubbs
25	John William Ronald Illangakoon		1 October 1936	1942	Reginald Edward Stubbs
26	Manikku Wadumestri Hendrick de Silva		7 July 1942	1946	Henry Monck-Mason Moore
27	Chellappah Nagalingam		25 January 1946	1947	Henry Monck-Mason Moore
28	Alan Edward Percival Rose		23 October 1947	1951	Henry Monck-Mason Moore
29	Hema Henry Basnayake		11 October 1951	1956	Herwald Ramsbotham
30	Edward Fredrick Noel Gratiaen		2 May 1956	1957	Oliver Ernest Goonetilleke
31	Douglas St. Clive Budd Jansze		1 April 1957	1966	Oliver Ernest Goonetilleke
32	Abdul Caffoor Mohamad Ameer		1966	1970	William Gopallawa
Attorney General of Sri Lanka
33	Victor Tennekoon	Central	1 July 1970	1975	William Gopallawa
34	Shiva Pasupati		5 June 1975	1988	William Gopallawa
35	Pandikoralalage Sunil Chandra De Silva		1988	1992	J. R. Jayewardene
36	Tilak Marapana	Sabaragamuwa	1992	1995	Ranasinghe Premadasa
37	Shibly Aziz		1995	1996	Chandrika Kumaratunga
38	Sarath N. Silva		1996	1999	Chandrika Kumaratunga
39	Kandapper Kamalasabayson	Eastern	1999	2007	Chandrika Kumaratunga
40	Chitta De Silva	Western	2007	2008	Mahinda Rajapaksa
41	Mohan Peiris		2008	2011	Mahinda Rajapaksa
42	Eva Wansundera	North Western	2011	2012	Mahinda Rajapaksa
43	Palitha Fernando		17 July 2012	23 October 2014	Mahinda Rajapaksa
44	Yuwanjana Wijayatilake		23 October 2014	10 January 2016	Mahinda Rajapaksa
45	Suhada Gamlath		10 January 2016	11 February 2016	Maithripala Sirisena
46	Jayantha Jayasuriya		11 February 2016	29 April 2019	Maithripala Sirisena
47	Dappula de Livera		29 April 2019	25 May 2021	Maithripala Sirisena
48	Sanjay Rajaratnam		26 May 2021	12 July 2024	Gotabaya Rajapaksa
49	Parinda Ranasinghe Jr.		12 July 2024	present	Ranil Wickramasinghe

== See also ==
- Chief Justice of Sri Lanka
- Solicitor General of Sri Lanka
