= William Coke =

Sir William Coke

Puisne Justice of the Supreme Court of Ceylon
- In office 28 October 1810 – 1 September 1818
- Succeeded by: Henry Byrne

Provisional Chief Justice of Ceylon
- In office 6 March 1809 – 1811
- Nominated by: Edmund Henry Lushington
- Appointed by: Alexander Johnston

4th Advocate Fiscal of Ceylon
- In office 5 September 1808 – 1811
- Governor: Thomas Maitland
- Preceded by: James Dunkin
- Succeeded by: Ambrose Hardinge Giffard

Personal details
- Born: 1776 England
- Died: 1 September 1818 (aged 41–42) Trincomalee, British Ceylon
- Education: Christ Church, Oxford, University of Oxford

Sir William Coke (1776 – 1 September 1818) was a Puisne Justice of the Supreme Court of Ceylon as well as acting as Provisional Chief Justice of Ceylon and the fourth Advocate Fiscal of Ceylon.

Coke arrived in Ceylon on 15 September 1808. He was appointed on 5 September 1808, succeeding James Dunkin, and held the office until 1811. He was succeeded by Ambrose Hardinge Giffard.

Coke died of dysentery when in Trincomalee for a Criminal Session.

Legal offices
Preceded by	Puisne Justice of the Supreme Court of Ceylon; 1810– 1818	Succeeded by Henry Byrne
Preceded by Edmund Henry Lushington	Provisional Chief Justice of Ceylon; 1809–1811	Succeeded by Alexander Johnston
Preceded by James Dunkin	Advocate Fiscal of Ceylon; 1808–1811	Succeeded by Ambrose Hardinge Giffard
