= John Dickinson (magistrate) =

British barrister and chief magistrate (1848–1933)

Sir John Dickinson (17 November 1848 – 29 October 1933) was a British barrister who was chief magistrate of the Metropolitan Police Courts from 1913 until 1920. On his retirement he was replaced by Sir Chartres Biron.

He was the fourth son of Joseph Dickinson M.D. of Liverpool, educated at Cheltenham School. He matriculated at Trinity College, Cambridge in 1867, graduating LL.B. in 1870 and LL.M. in 1874. He entered the Inner Temple in 1868 and was called to the bar in 1871. A Metropolitan Police Magistrate at Thames Police Court from 1890, he became Chief Metropolitan Stipendiary Magistrate at Bow Street in 1913, receiving the customary knighthood. He retired in 1920.
