= William Ogle Carr =

Chief Justice of British Ceylon from 1854 to 1856

Sir William Ogle Carr

9th Chief Justice of Ceylon
- In office 17 April 1854 – 1856
- Appointed by: George William Anderson
- Preceded by: Anthony Oliphant
- Succeeded by: William Carpenter Rowe

8th King's Advocate of Ceylon
- In office 2 April 1833 – 1838
- Governor: Robert Wilmot-Horton
- Preceded by: William Norris
- Succeeded by: John Stark

Personal details
- Born: 13 November 1802 George Street, Bloomsbury, Middlesex, England
- Died: 24 April 1856 (aged 53) Colombo, Western Province, British Ceylon
- Resting place: Galle Face Cemetery, Colombo, Sri Lanka
- Spouse: Elizabeth Maria Clement
- Children: William Ogle Carr; Clement Morton Carr; Frances Margaret Carr

Sir William Ogle Carr (13 November 1802 – 24 April 1856) was the ninth Chief Justice of Ceylon and eighth King's Advocate of Ceylon. He was appointed on 17 April 1854, succeeding Anthony Oliphant, and was Chief Justice until 1856. He was succeeded by William Carpenter Rowe.

Carr took J. G. Hildebrand on the bench. In the following year he functioned as Senior Puisne Justice before being confirmed in the post. When Chief Justice Oliphant retired in 1854 Carr took the middle seat.

Legal offices
Preceded by Anthony Oliphant	Chief Justice of Ceylon; 1854-1856	Succeeded by William Carpenter Rowe
Preceded by William Norris	King's Advocate of Ceylon; 1833-1838	Succeeded by John Stark
