= Henry Matthews (judge) =

English judge (1789–1828)

Puisne Justice of the Supreme Court of Ceylon
- In office 10 October 1827 – 1828

6th Advocate Fiscal of Ceylon
- In office 1 November 1821 – 1829
- Governor: Edward Barnes
- Preceded by: Ambrose Hardinge Giffard
- Succeeded by: William Norris

Personal details
- Born: 1789 England
- Died: 20 May 1828 (aged 38–39)
- Relations: John Matthews (father)
- Children: Henry Matthews, 1st Viscount Llandaff
- Education: King's College, Cambridge

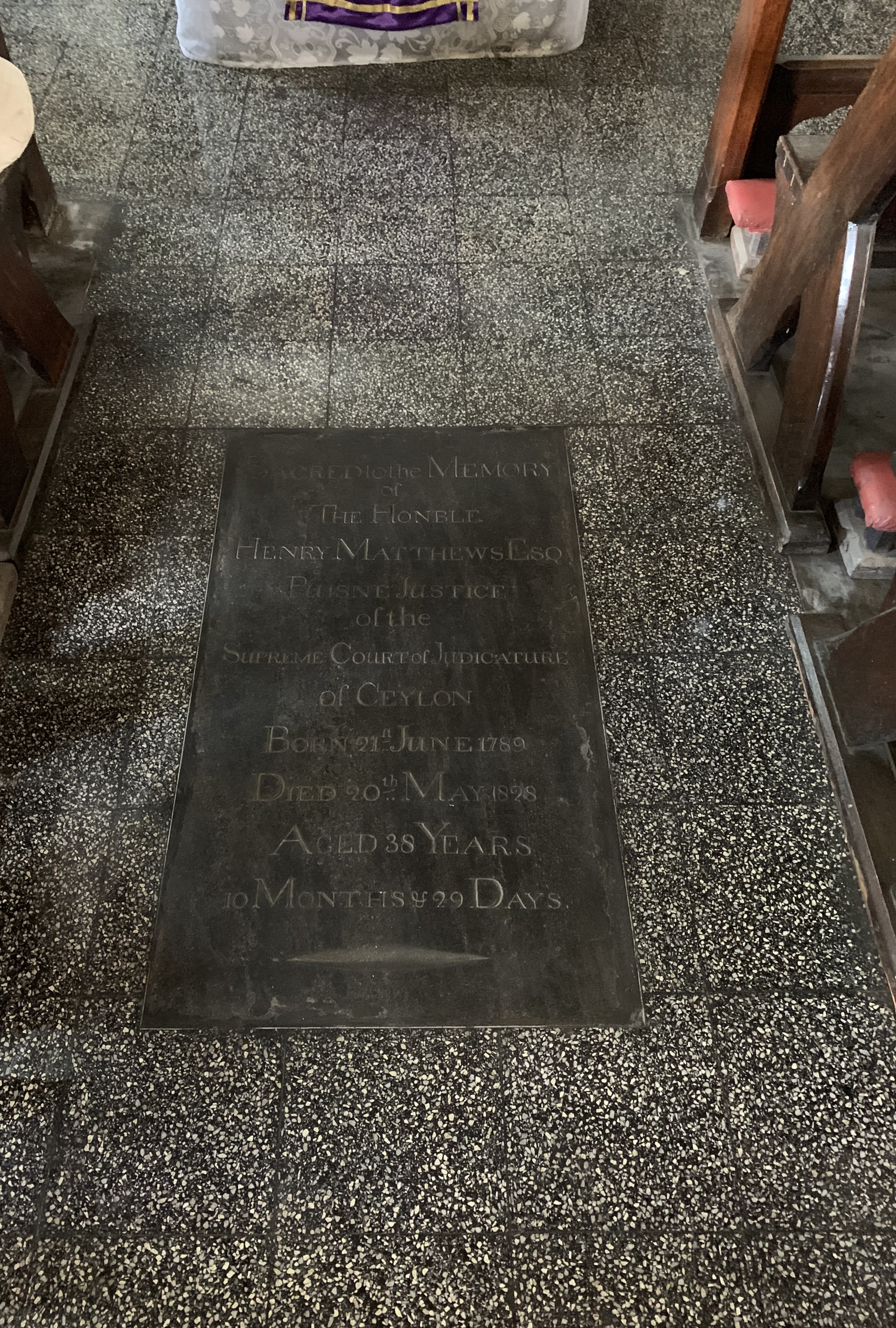

Henry Matthews (1789 – 20 May 1828) was a Puisne Justice of the Supreme Court of Ceylon and the sixth Advocate Fiscal of Ceylon. He was appointed on 1 November 1821, succeeding Ambrose Hardinge Giffard, and held the office until 1829. He was succeeded by William Norris.

Legal offices
Preceded by	Puisne Justice of the Supreme Court of Ceylon; 1827 – 1828	Succeeded by
Preceded by Ambrose Hardinge Giffard	Advocate Fiscal of Ceylon; 1821–1829	Succeeded by William Norris
