= Charles Murray-Aynsley =

British colonial judge (1893–1967)

Sir Charles Murray Murray-Aynsley

1st Chief Justice of the Colony of Singapore
- In office 1946–1955
- Preceded by: Position established
- Succeeded by: Sir John Whyatt

Chief Justice of Tonga
- In office 1930–1935

Chief Justice of Grenada
- In office 1935–1938

Personal details
- Born: 28 November 1893
- Died: 30 August 1967 (aged 73) Florence, Italy
- Education: St John's College, Cambridge
- Occupation: Colonial judge

Sir Charles Murray Murray-Aynsley (28 November 1893 – 30 August 1967) was a British colonial judge who served as Chief Justice of Singapore from 1946 to 1955.

== Early life and education ==
Murray-Aynsley was born on 28 November 1893, the only son of Rev Alfred Murray-Aynsley. He served with the King's Royal Rifle Corps (1914–1919), and while serving in France (1915–16), he was severely wounded. He was educated at Marlborough College, St Paul's School, and at St John's College, Cambridge where he received double firsts in history and law.

== Career ==
In 1920, Murray-Aynsley was called to the Bar by the Inner Temple and practised on the North-eastern circuit from 1920 to 1927. He then joined the Colonial Judicial Service and went to Belize, British Honduras as District Commissioner and acted as Attorney-General on several occasions. He served as Chief Justice of Tonga (1930–1935); Chief Justice of Grenada (1935–1938), and Puisne Judge of the Federated Malay States and Supreme Court of the Straits Settlements. During the Second World War he was interned as a POW in Singapore. From 1946 until his retirement in 1955 he served as Chief Justice of Singapore.

== Personal life and death ==
Murray-Aynsley married Elsa Goldberg in 1920 and following her death in 1950 he married Ann-Maria Curth. He had no children.

Murray-Aynsley died on 30 August 1967 in Florence, Italy.

== Honours ==
Murray-Aynsley was created a Knight Bachelor in the 1950 Birthday Honours.
