= Laurence Rivers Dunne =

Sir Laurence Rivers Dunne, MC (4 October 1893 – 30 June 1970) was a British barrister and magistrate who served as Chief Metropolitan Stipendiary Magistrate from 1948 to 1960.
