= Kenneth Barraclough =

British barrister and magistrate

Sir Kenneth James Priestley Barraclough, CBE, TD, JP (22 March 1907 – 3 April 2001) was a British barrister and magistrate who was Chief Metropolitan Stipendiary Magistrate between 1975 and 1978.

He was also a colonel in the Inns of Court Regiment.
