= Henry Byrne (judge) =

Puisne Justice of the Supreme Court of Ceylon
- In office 15 November 1818 – 1819
- Preceded by: William Coke
- Succeeded by: Richard Ottley

Personal details
- Profession: Barrister

Henry Byrne was a barrister who served as a Puisne Justice of the Supreme Court of Ceylon.

Legal offices
Preceded by William Coke	Puisne Justice of the Supreme Court of Ceylon; 1818–1819	Succeeded by Richard Ottley
