= Chief Justice of Grenada =

The chief justice of Grenada is the head of the Supreme Court of Grenada which consists of the High Court with three justices and a two-tier Court of Appeal.

The original High Court of Grenada was replaced by the Windward and Leeward Islands Supreme Court and the Windward and Leeward Islands Court of Appeal in 1939; both of the latter were replaced in 1967 by the Eastern Caribbean Supreme Court which performs both functions. The Eastern Caribbean Supreme Court, known in Grenada as the Supreme Court of Grenada and the West Indies Associated States, is headquartered in St Lucia, and is now the superior court of record for Grenada and the other Caribbean states which comprise the Organisation of Eastern Caribbean States.

== Chief justices ==
- 1763 Grenada became British colony
- c.1770 James Brebner
- 1783–1787 William Lucas
- 1788–1804 Thomas Bridgewater
- 1805–1808 George Smith (afterwards Chief Judge of Trinidad, 1808)
- 1809–1812 Archibald Gloster (afterwards Chief Justice of Dominica, 1812)
- 1814–1820 Sir Richard Ottley (afterwards a judge in Ceylon, 1820 and later Chief Justice of Ceylon, 1827)
- 1820–1833 Jeffery Hart Bent (afterwards Chief Justice of St Lucia, 1833)
- c.1838-c.1847 John Sanderson
- 1847–1863 William Darnell Davis
- 1863–1895 John Foster Gresham
  - 1881–1882 Henry Rawlins Pipon Schooles (acting)
- 1895–1897 Joseph Turner Hutchinson (afterwards Chief Justice of Cyprus, 1898)
- 1897–1905 Sir Charles James Tarring
- 1906–1909 John Bayldon Walker
- 1909–1914 Robert Stewart Johnstone
- 1914–1916 F Hardyman Parker
- 1916–1921 Thomas Haycraft (afterwards Chief Justice of Palestine, 1921)
- 1921–1925 George O'Donnell Walton
- 1927–?1931 James Stanley Rae (afterwards Chief Justice of the Leeward Islands, c.1931)
- 1931–1935 Robert Stephen Vere de Vere
- 1935–1938 Sir Charles Murray Murray-Aynsley (afterwards Chief Justice of Singapore, 1946)
- 1939 Windward and Leeward Islands Supreme Court and Court of Appeal established. See Chief Justice of the Leeward Islands
- 1967 Eastern Caribbean Supreme Court established
- 1974 Grenada became independent
- 1979–1985 Robert Archibald Nedd
  - 1986 Dennis Byron (acting)
  - 1987 James Patterson (Acting)
- 1987–1990 Sir Samuel Horatio Graham
- 1990–1991 Carol Bristol
- 1991 OECS Court restored.
