= Chief Metropolitan Stipendiary Magistrate =

The Chief Metropolitan Stipendiary Magistrate, known as Chief Metropolitan Police Magistrate until 1949, and also known as the Chief Metropolitan Magistrate and Chief Magistrate of the Police Courts of the Metropolis, was a senior British magistrate based in London. The most senior metropolitan stipendiary magistrate (full-time magistrates appointed for London and the surrounding counties), the Chief Metropolitan Magistrate had responsibilities for the administration of the London magistrates' courts as well as the appointment of metropolitan stipendiary magistrates. He also had special responsibilities in relation to extradition proceedings. The Chief Metropolitan Magistrate was based at Bow Street Magistrates' Court.

The position was abolished on 31 August 2000 by the Access to Justice Act 1999, which unified the stipendiary bench of England and Wales and renamed stipendiary magistrates to District Judge (Magistrates’ Courts). The position of Chief Metropolitan Magistrate, which had no equivalent outside of London, was replaced with that of Senior District Judge (Chief Magistrate), also known as Chief Magistrate, who has leadership responsibility for all District Judges (Magistrates’ Courts) in England and Wales.

The most famous Chief Metropolitan Magistrate was the novelist Henry Fielding, who founded the Bow Street Runners, London's first intermittently funded, full-time police force.

== List of Chief Metropolitan Stipendiary Magistrates ==
- 1739/1740–1746: Sir Thomas de Veil
- 1748–1754: Henry Fielding
- 1754–1780: Sir John Fielding
- 1780–1793: Sir Sampson Wright
- 1793–1800: Sir William Addington
- 1800–1806: Sir Richard Ford
- 1806–1813: James Read
- 1813–1820: Sir Nathaniel Conant
- 1820–1821: Sir Robert Baker
- 1821–1832: Sir Richard Birnie
- 1832–1839: Sir Frederick Adair Roe
- 1839–1864: Thomas James Hall
- 1864–1876: Sir Thomas Henry
- 1876–1890: Sir James Ingham
- 1890–1899: Sir John Bridge
- 1899–1901: Sir Franklin Lushington
- 1901–1913: Sir Albert de Rutzen
- 1913: Sir Henry Curtis Bennett
- 1913–1920: Sir John Dickinson
- 1920–1933: Sir Henry Chartres Biron
- 1933–1940: Sir Rollo Frederick Graham-Campbell
- 1940–1941: Sir Robert Ernest Dummett
- 1941–1948: Sir Bertrand Watson
- 1948–1960: Sir Laurence Rivers Dunne
- 1960–1967: Sir Robert Henderson Blundell
- 1967–1975: Sir Frank Milton
- 1975–1978: Sir Kenneth James Priestley Barraclough
- 1978–1982: Sir Evelyn Charles Sackville Russell
- 1982–1992: Sir David Armand Hopkin
- 1992–1997: Sir Peter Gilmour Noto Badge
- 1997–2000: Graham Edward Parkinson
