= James Dunkin =

Inaugural Attorney General of Sri Lanka

1st & 3rd Advocate Fiscal of Ceylon
- In office 19 February 1801 – 1802
- Governor: Frederick North
- Preceded by: Office Created
- Succeeded by: Alexander Johnston
- In office 22 April 1806 – 1808
- Governor: Thomas Maitland
- Preceded by: Alexander Johnston
- Succeeded by: William Coke

James Dunkin was the first and third Advocate Fiscal of Ceylon. He was appointed on 19 February 1801 and held the office until 1802. Dunkin was appointed again in 1806. He was succeeded by Alexander Johnston.

Legal offices
Preceded by Alexander Johnston	Advocate Fiscal of Ceylon; 1806–1808	Succeeded by William Coke
Preceded by Office Created	Advocate Fiscal of Ceylon; 1801–1802	Succeeded by Alexander Johnston
