= Richard Ottley (judge) =

Chief Justice of British Ceylon from 1827 to 1833

Sir Richard Ottley

5th Chief Justice of Ceylon
- In office 1 November 1827 – 1833
- Appointed by: Edward Barnes
- Preceded by: Ambrose Hardinge Giffard
- Succeeded by: Charles Marshall

Puisne Justice of the Supreme Court of Ceylon
- In office 8 May 1820 – 1 November 1827
- Preceded by: Henry Byrne

Personal details
- Born: 1782
- Died: 1845 (aged 62–63)
- Spouse(s): Sarah Elizabeth Ottley, née Young

Sir Richard Ottley (1782–1845) was the fifth Chief Justice of the Supreme Court of Judicature of Ceylon.

He was the son of Drewry Ottley of St Vincent in the West Indies, and was married to 2nd baronet William Young's daughter, Sarah Elizabeth. He owned two slaves that had been left to him as a legacy of his grandmother, Mrs Jackson.

In 1814 he was appointed Chief Justice of Grenada. He sailed to Ceylon in 1820 to take up the position of judge after having been knighted (22 March 1820) and was promoted to Chief Justice of Ceylon on 1 November 1827, succeeding Ambrose Hardinge Giffard. He held that position until 1833, when he was succeeded by Charles Marshall.

He resided at 50 York Street, Portman Square in London after retiring his judgeship.

Legal offices
Preceded by Ambrose Hardinge Giffard	Chief Justice of Ceylon; 1827-1833	Succeeded by Charles Marshall
Preceded by Henry Byrne	Puisne Justice of the Supreme Court of Ceylon; 1820–1819	Succeeded by
Preceded by Archibald Gloster	Chief Justice of Grenada; 1814-1820	Succeeded by Jeffery Hart Bent
