= Henry Collingwood Selby =

11th Queen's Advocate of Ceylon
- In office 23 June 1848 – 1858
- Governor: George Byng
- Preceded by: Arthur William Buller
- Succeeded by: Henry Byerley Thomson

Henry Collingwood Selby was the 11th Queen's Advocate of Ceylon. He was appointed on 23 June 1848, succeeding Arthur William Buller, and held the office until 1858. He was succeeded by Henry Byerley Thomson.

Legal offices
Preceded by Arthur William Buller	Queen's Advocate of Ceylon; 1848–1858	Succeeded by Henry Byerley Thomson
