= Charles Marshall (judge) =

Chief Justice of British Ceylon from 1833 to 1836

Sir Charles Marshall

6th Chief Justice of Ceylon
- In office 18 February 1833 – 3 March 1836
- Appointed by: Robert Wilmot-Horton
- Preceded by: Richard Ottley
- Succeeded by: William Norris

Puisne Justice of the Supreme Court of Ceylon
- In office 1829 – 18 February 1833

Provisional Puisne Justice of the Supreme Court of Ceylon
- In office 14 June 1828 – 1829

Personal details
- Born: 1788
- Died: 5 February 1873 (aged 84–85) London, England
- Education: Jesus College, Cambridge

Sir Charles Marshall (1788 – 5 February 1873) was the sixth Chief Justice of Ceylon.

Marshall was the only son of Samuel Marshall, a lawyer and serjeant at law, and was educated at Westminster School. He matriculated at Jesus College, Cambridge in 1806, graduating B.A. in 1810, and M.A. in 1814. He was called to the Bar at the Inner Temple in 1815.

Marshall was knighted in 1832 and appointed Chief Justice of Ceylon on 18 February 1833, succeeding Richard Ottley. In 1835 he fought a duel with Sir John Wilson, in command of British troops in Ceylon, which took place in the Cinnamon Gardens, Colombo, once a plantation. He held the position until his resignation on 3 March 1836, when he was succeeded by William Norris.

Marshall produced the first book on Sri Lankan Law. He also published Term Reports Common Pleas and Marshall on Insurance. In 1851 he married Mary, the widow of John Cox and sister-in-law of the Rev John Oliver, warden of the London Diocesan Penitentiary. He died at his London home of 5 Kensington Garden Terrace in 1873.

Legal offices
Preceded by Richard Ottley	Chief Justice of Ceylon; 1833–1836	Succeeded by William Norris
Preceded by	Puisne Justice of the Supreme Court of Ceylon; 1828– 1833	Succeeded by
