= William Carpenter Rowe =

Chief Justice of British Ceylon from 1857 to 1859

Sir William Carpenter Rowe

10th Chief Justice of Ceylon
- In office 1857–1859
- Appointed by: Henry George Ward
- Preceded by: William Ogle Carr
- Succeeded by: Edward Shepherd Creasy

Personal details
- Born: 1801 Launceston, Cornwall, England
- Died: 9 November 1859 (aged 58) Point de Galle, Ceylon

Sir William Carpenter Rowe (bapt. 28 July 1801 – 9 November 1859) was an English jurist and the tenth Chief Justice of Ceylon.

== Early Days ==
He was born in Launceston, Cornwall, the eldest son of Dr. Coryndon Rowe, and Ann. He was educated at Winchester College and Balliol College, Oxford.

== Career ==
He was knighted in January 1856. The following February he was appointed Chief Justice of Ceylon to succeed William Ogle Carr. He held the post until 1859 when he was succeeded in turn by Edward Shepherd Creasy.

While resident in Ceylon he was elected the fourth President of the Ceylon Branch of the Royal Asiatic Society, serving from 1859 to his death.

== Personal life ==
He was married to Frances Elizabeth Storey and lived whilst in Ceylon at The Lodge, Kandy, where they had one child. He died after a short illness on 9 November 1859 at Point de Galle, Ceylon. He was buried at All Saints Church, Galle Fort, Ceylon, aged 58.

Legal offices
Preceded by William Ogle Carr	Chief Justice of Ceylon; 1857-1859	Succeeded by Edward Shepherd Creasy
