= Richard Morgan (Ceylonese judge) =

Ceylonese lawyer

Hon. Sir Richard Morgan
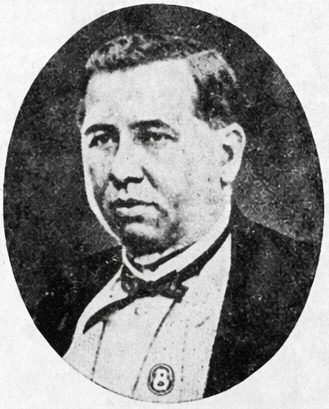

Acting Chief Justice of Ceylon
- In office 1874–1874

13th Queen's Advocate of Ceylon
- In office 1 January 1863 – 1876
- Governor: Charles Justin MacCarthy
- Preceded by: Henry Byerley Thomson
- Succeeded by: Richard Cayley

Acting Deputy Queen's Advocate of Ceylon
- In office 1 May 1862 – 1 January 1863

Acting Queen's Advocate of Ceylon
- In office 16 April 1861 – 1 May 1862
- In office 19 November 1857 – 1858

Judge of the District Court of Colombo
- In office 6 November 1860 – 16 April 1861
- In office 1858 – 21 May 1859
- In office 1 October 1856 – 1 January 1857

Acting Senior Puisne Justice of the Supreme Court of Ceylon
- In office 1 January 1860 – 6 November 1860

Acting Second Puisne Justice of the Supreme Court of Ceylon
- In office 1 January 1857 – 19 November 1857

Personal details
- Born: 21 February 1821 Colombo, Ceylon
- Died: 27 January 1876 (aged 54) Colombo, Ceylon

Sir Richard Francis Morgan (21 February 1821 – 27 January 1876) was a Ceylonese (Sri Lankan) lawyer, who served as the 13th Queen's Advocate of Ceylon and acting Chief Justice of Ceylon. He was the first Asian in the British Empire to receive a Knighthood and first Ceylonese to be a member of the Governor's Executive Council and was an unofficial (Burgher) member of the Legislative Council of Ceylon. He was the Crown Advocate who prosecuted famed bandit Saradiel.

Sir Richard was the 11th and youngest child of Owen Richard Morgan, port magistrate of Colombo, and Behrana Lucretea Lourensz. He was educated at the Colombo Academy.

Morgan was knighted in 1874, while serving as Crown Advocate of Ceylon. He was made acting Chief Justice of Ceylon, after E. S. Creasy had returned to England on sick leave. His son was Lieutenant Colonel Richard Hillebrand Morgan.

== See also ==
- Whist Bungalow

Legal offices
Preceded by	Puisne Justice of the Supreme Court of Ceylon -	Succeeded by
Preceded by Henry Byerley Thomson	Queen's Advocate of Ceylon; 1863–1876	Succeeded by Richard Cayley
