= Franklin Lushington =

British barrister and judge (1823–1901)

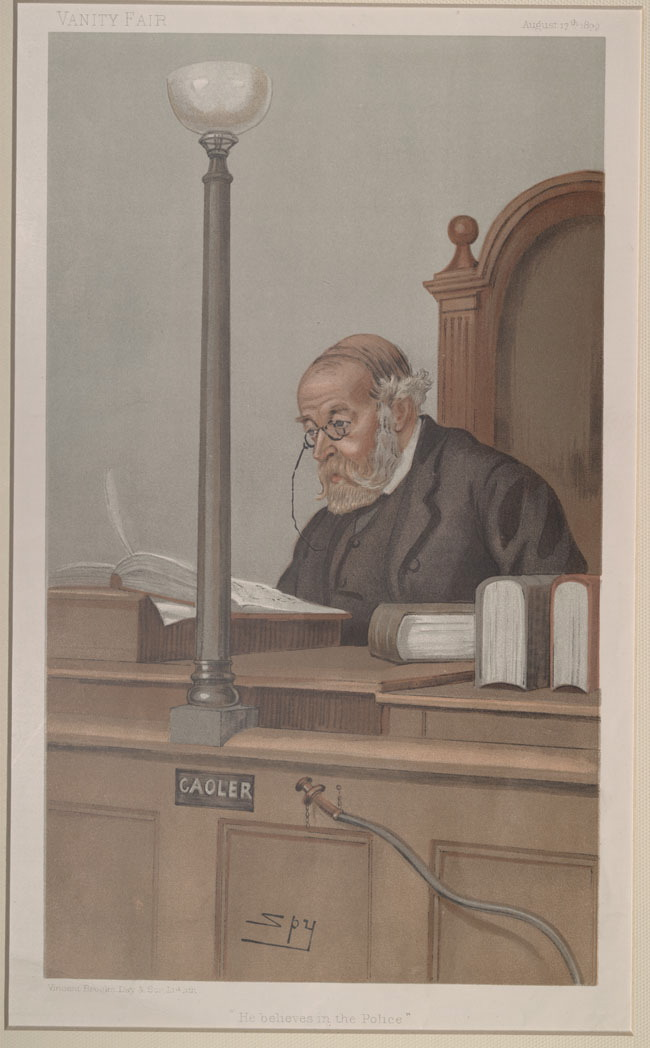
Illustration in Vanity Fair, 1899

Sir Franklin Lushington (4 January 1823 – 10 November 1901) was a British barrister and judge. He was Chief Magistrate of the Metropolitan Police Courts in London from 1899 until his death, in succession to Sir John Bridge.

A member of the Lushington family, Franklin Lushington was the son of Edmund Henry Lushington and the brother of Henry Lushington. He was a member of the Supreme Council of Justice of the United States of the Ionian Islands, serving until 1858. Appointed a metropolitan magistrate at the Thames Magistrates' Court in 1869, he was transferred to Bow Street Magistrates' Court in 1890.

Franklin Lushington was a close friend of the writer Edward Lear, who met him in Malta in 1849 and then toured southern Greece with him. Lear developed an infatuation for him that Lushington did not wholly reciprocate. Although they remained friends for almost forty years, until Lear's death, the disparity of their feelings constantly tormented Lear. Indeed, Lear's attempts at male companionship were not always successful; the very intensity of Lear's affections may have doomed these relationships.
