= Chartres Biron =

Henry Biron.

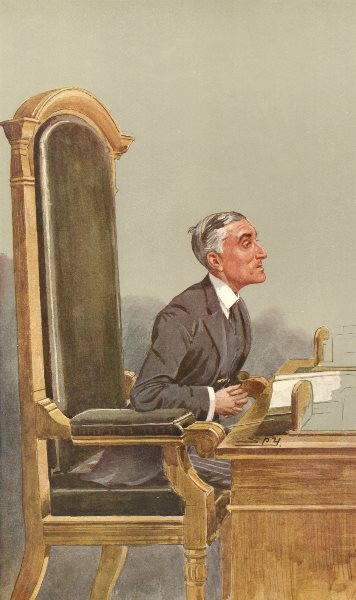
Henry Chartres Biron Worship Street. "Spy", 1907.

Sir Henry Chartres Biron (10 January 1863 – 28 January 1940) was a British barrister who was later chief magistrate of the metropolitan police courts. He presided over the trial for obscenity of Radclyffe Hall's lesbian novel, The Well of Loneliness.

== Early life ==
Henry Chartres Biron was born on 10 January 1863. His father was the barrister and police magistrate R.J. Biron Q.C. His mother was the sister of F.A. Inderwick K.C., the noted divorce lawyer. He was educated at Eton College and Trinity College, Cambridge.

== Career ==
Biron was called to the bar at Lincoln's Inn in 1886. He appeared at the Central Criminal Court, the London Sessions, the Metropolitan Police Courts, and on the South-Eastern Circuit. He was appointed prosecuting counsel for the Post Office and Treasury Counsel at the London Sessions. In 1903 he was junior counsel for the defence in the Arthur Alfred Lynch M.P. high treason trial in which the defendant was found guilty and sentenced to death but later pardoned.

He practiced exclusively in crime until he became a London stipendiary magistrate in 1906. In the same year, he was an unsuccessful Liberal Party parliamentary candidate for Hythe. In 1920, he became chief magistrate of the Metropolitan Police Courts following the retirement of Sir John Dickinson, and received a knighthood as was customary on appointment to that position.

In 1921, the early stages of the case of fraud by Horatio Bottomley M.P. were heard before Biron. Bottomley was subsequently jailed for seven years in a higher court. In 1927, Biron was a member of the Street Offences Committee.

In 1928, Biron presided over the trial for obscenity at Bow Street Magistrates' Court of Radclyffe Hall's lesbian novel, The Well of Loneliness, ruling that the book was an "obscene libel" and that all copies should be destroyed. The book was not published again until 1949. According to The Times, Biron's ruling was not based on the acts described in the book, which he said did not of themselves make the book obscene, but on the lack of condemnation of the acts and the behaviour of the characters. According to Biron, the book contained "not one word which suggested that anyone with the horrible tendencies described was in the least degree blameworthy. All the characters in the book were presented as attractive people and put forward with admiration".

== Outside law ==
Biron was a member of the Royal Yacht Squadron and an adventurous traveller. He loved literature, collected the sayings of Samuel Johnson in book form and as a young man wrote a parody of Rider Haggard's King Solomon's Mines as "Hyder Ragged", in 1887. He wrote many book reviews for the National and the London Mercury. His memoirs were published in 1926 as Without prejudice: Impressions of life and law. He was a member of Brooks's and the Garrick Club.

== Death ==
Biron died at his home in London on 28 January 1940. He never married.

== Selected publications ==
- King Solomon's Wives; or, the Phantom Mines, Chartres Biron writing as Hyder Ragged. London: Vizetelly & Co., 1887.
- The Law and Practice of Extradition. London: Stevens and Son, 1903. (With Kenneth Edlmann Chalmers)
- ‘ “Sir,” Said Dr. Johnson –’: Some Sayings, ed. Sir Chartres Biron. London: Duckworth, 1911. Reprinted, London: Jonathan Cape “Travellers’ Library,” 1932.
- Pious Opinions. London: Duckworth, 1923.
- Without Prejudice: Impressions of Life and Law. London: Faber and Faber, 1926.
