= John Stark (judge) =

Scottish lawyer and judge

John (or James) Stark

9th Queen's Advocate of Ceylon
- In office 10 December 1838 – 1840
- Governor: James Alexander Stewart-Mackenzie
- Preceded by: William Ogle Carr
- Succeeded by: Arthur William Buller

John Stark (otherwise described as James Stark by Burke and others) (born 5 May 1798) was a Scottish lawyer who became the ninth Queen's Advocate of Ceylon.

== Life ==
Born in Kirkcudbright, he passed the Scottish bar examination in 1824 and served as a lawyer in Edinburgh, becoming the Ruling Elder of the city's Council and First Bailie of the city. On 10 December 1838, he was appointed Queen's Advocate of Ceylon to succeed William Ogle Carr, a position by which he was also a member of the island's executive and legislative councils. He held the office until 1840, when he was raised to join Carr as a puisne judge of the Supreme Court under Chief Justice Oliphant, being succeeded as Advocate by Arthur William Buller.

Whilst in Ceylon he was the originator and founding President of the Ceylon Branch of the Royal Asiatic Society in 1845, based in Colombo. In addition to his published contributions to the society's journal he was also a contributor to Encyclopaedia Britannica and other works.

== Family ==
He married the daughter of Major James Gibson and had two sons, James Gibson Stark and William Stark.

Legal offices
Preceded by William Ogle Carr	Queen's Advocate of Ceylon; 1838–1840	Succeeded by Arthur William Buller
