= Ambrose Hardinge Giffard =

Chief Justice of British Ceylon from 1819 to 1827

Sir Ambrose Hardinge Giffard
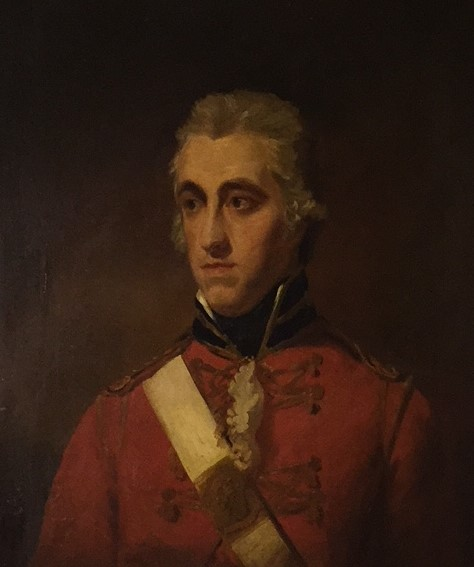

4th Chief Justice of Ceylon
- In office 8 April 1819 – 2 March 1827
- Governor: Robert Brownrigg
- Preceded by: Alexander Johnston
- Succeeded by: Richard Ottley

5th Advocate Fiscal of Ceylon
- In office 26 February 1811 – 1821
- Governor: John Wilson
- Preceded by: William Coke
- Succeeded by: Henry Mathews

Personal details
- Born: 1771 Dublin, Ireland
- Died: 20 April 1827 (aged 55–56)
- Education: Trinity College Dublin

Sir Ambrose Hardinge Giffard (1771–1827) was Chief Justice of British Ceylon.

== Life ==
Ambrose Hardinge Giffard, known to his family as Hardinge, was born in Dublin in 1771, the eldest son of Sarah, daughter of William Morton, of Ballynaclash, County Wexford, and John Giffard (1745–1819), High Sheriff of Dublin in 1794, Accountant-General of Customs in Dublin, and a prominent loyalist. He was named after his father's guardian, Ambrose Harding, an attorney for James Annesley in the celebrated trial of 1743. (Hardinge's grandfather was John Giffard of Torrington, Devon, who gave crucial evidence in the trial, which turned the scales dramatically in favour of the claimant, James Annesley.)

After studying for the law he was called to the bar of the Inner Temple, and was appointed Chief Justice of Ceylon in April 1819. Giffard's health failed, and he was granted leave of absence, but he died on 30 April 1827, while on the homeward voyage, in Lady Kennaway, East Indiaman. Before his death a knighthood was conferred upon Giffard, but the title was never gazetted.

== Works ==
Giffard's leisure was devoted to literature, and a selection of poems was published in Ceylon about 1822. Some are reproduced in the Traditions and Recollections of Richard Polwhele.

== Family ==
He married in 1808 Harriet, daughter of Lovell Pennell, esq., of Lyme Regis, and left five sons and five daughters. Admiral Sir George Giffard (1815–1888) was his third son.

Legal offices
| Preceded by Alexander Johnston | Chief Justice of Ceylon; 1819–1827 | Succeeded by Richard Ottley |
| Preceded by William Coke | Advocate Fiscal of Ceylon; 1811–1821 | Succeeded by Henry Mathews |
