= George Stovin Venables =

George Stovin Venables (1810–1888), born in Wales, was a journalist and a barrister at the English bar.

His father was Richard Venables, vicar of Nantmel and then archdeacon of Carmarthen. He was educated at Eton College, Charterhouse School, and Jesus College, Cambridge. At Cambridge, he won the Chancellor's Gold Medal for poetry in 1831, and was a Cambridge Apostle from 1832. He became a Fellow of Jesus College.

He was called to the Bar at the Inner Temple in 1836, and was in practice for over 40 years. He also wrote much journalism from the mid-1850s, as a leader writer for The Times and the Saturday Review.

His literary connections included time at Charterhouse with William Makepeace Thackeray (they fought); the character George Warrington in Pendennis is said to be based on Venables. A friendship with Alfred, Lord Tennyson arose from Cambridge days. He wrote an anonymous book of verse Joint Compositions (1848) with Henry Lushington. He was an early and favourable reviewer of Thomas Carlyle, another friend.
