= Peter Badge =

British solicitor and judge (1931–2020)

Sir Peter Gilmour Noto Badge (20 November 1931 – 29 October 2020) was a British solicitor and judge who was Chief Metropolitan Stipendiary Magistrate from 1992 to 1997. As Chief Magistrate, he handled a series of high-profile committals, including those of Szymon Serafinowicz under the War Crimes Act 1991 and of Rosemary West.

He was also a leading authority on coracles. The founder, then chairman and president of the Coracle Society, he said in 1997 that “coracles and currachs are my main obsession in life.”
