= William Norris (judge) =

Chief Justice of British Ceylon from 1836 to 1837

Sir William Norris

7th Chief Justice of Ceylon
- In office 27 April 1836 – 1837
- Appointed by: Robert Wilmot-Horton
- Preceded by: Charles Marshall
- Succeeded by: Anthony Oliphant

Puisne Justice of the Supreme Court of Ceylon
- In office 1834 – 27 April 1836

7th Advocate Fiscal of Ceylon
- In office 28 February 1829 – 1833
- Governor: Edward Barnes
- Preceded by: Henry Matthews
- Succeeded by: William Ogle Carr

Personal details
- Born: 7 July 1795 London, England
- Died: 7 September 1859 (aged 64) Ashurst Lodge, Sunningdale, Berkshire, England
- Spouse: Fearne Kinnear (m. 1829)
- Children: 2, including William Edward Norris

Sir William Norris (6 July 1795 – 7 September 1859) was the seventh Chief Justice of Ceylon and seventh Advocate Fiscal of Ceylon.

He was born in London, the son of William Norris, who was President of the Royal College of Surgeons in 1824, and his wife, Hannah Phillips. He was baptised in Bray, Berkshire at two weeks old. He studied law at the Middle Temple and was called to the bar in 1827. He moved to India in 1829 to practice there.

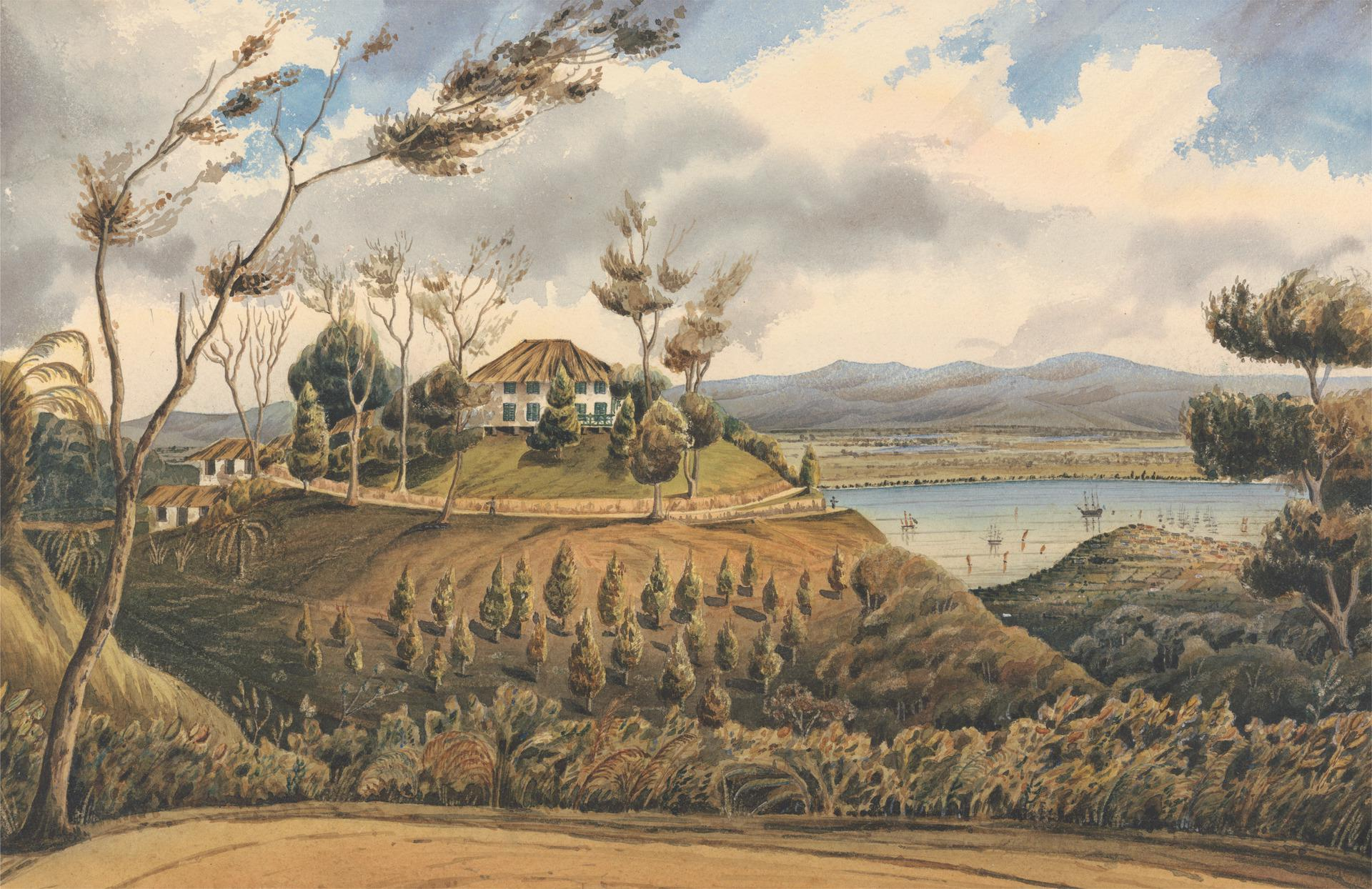
Sir William Norris's bungalow, in Penang in 1844

He was knighted by letters .patent in 1835 and appointed a puisne judge in Ceylon. He was promoted to Chief Justice of Ceylon on 27 April 1836, succeeding Charles Marshall, holding the post until 1837. He was succeeded by Anthony Oliphant. Norris was appointed despite William Rough having served on the bench since 1831, as acting puisne justice, senior puisne justice and as acting chief justice.

His son was the author William Edward Norris. His daughter Anne Grace Norris married the future Governor Arthur Havelock.

Legal offices
Preceded by Charles Marshall	Chief Justice of Ceylon; 1836-1837	Succeeded by Anthony Oliphant
Preceded by Henry Matthews	Advocate Fiscal of Ceylon; 1829-1833	Succeeded by William Ogle Carr
