= Henry Lushington =

British writer and civil servant

Henry Lushington (1812–1855) was an English colonial administrator, chief secretary to the government of Malta. He was a Cambridge Apostle.

== Life ==
Lushington was born in Singleton, near Poulton-le-Fylde, Lancashire, 13 April 1812. His father, Edmund Henry Lushington, of Queens' College, Cambridge, B.A. 1787, M.A. 1790, was a puisne judge in Ceylon. Henry, the second son, was educated at Charterhouse School, 1823–8, and at the age of 15 was at the head of the school. He became a student of Trinity College, Cambridge in October 1829. In 1832, and again in 1833, he obtained the university's Porson Prize for Greek iambics. In 1834 he graduated B.A. as senior optime and with a first class in the classical tripos, and he proceeded M.A. in 1837. He was elected a fellow of his college in 1836. Called to the bar at the Inner Temple on 20 November 1840, he went the home circuit.

Lushington was one of the earliest and most zealous admirers of Tennyson's youthful genius. In 1841 he made the poet's personal acquaintance, and the dedication of The Princess to Lushington in 1847 commemorates the cordial intimacy which followed. Lord Grey in 1847 appointed him chief secretary to the government of Malta, and in 1849 he brought forward the proposed code of laws before the newly elected legislative council. Although in weak health he remained at his post till 1855, when he left for a visit to England.

He died on the journey at Paris, 11 August 1855, and was buried at Boxley, Kent.

== Publications ==
Lushington wrote:

- Julius Cæsar, act ii. sc. 2; Richard II, act iii. sc. 2; with Greek versions. Printed in Prolusiones Academicæ, Cambridge, 1828.
- Fellow Commoners and Honorary Degrees, 1837.
- A Great Country's Little Wars, or England, Affghanistan, and Sinde, 1844.
- The Broad and Narrow Gauge, 1846.
- Fallacies of the Broken Gauge, 1846, two editions.
- A Detailed Exposure of the Apology put forth by the Neapolitan Government in Reply to the Charges of Mr. Gladstone, 1851.
- The Double Government, the Civil Service, and the Indian Reform Agitation, 1853.

With his brother Franklin Lushington he wrote:

- La Nation Boutiquière, and other Poems, 1855.
- Two Battle-Pieces in Verse, 1855.
- The Italian War, 1848–49. By H. Lushington. With a biographical Preface by G. S. Venables, 1859.

With George Stovin Venables he wrote a small book of verses:

- Joint Compositions; privately printed 1840.
