= Arthur William Buller =

British politician

Sir Arthur William Buller

Queen's Advocate of Ceylon
- In office 17 October 1840 – 1848
- Governor: James Alexander Stewart-Mackenzie
- Preceded by: John Stark
- Succeeded by: Henry Collingwood Selby

Personal details
- Born: 5 September 1808 Calcutta, British India
- Died: 30 May 1869 (aged 60) Hanover Square, Westminster, England
- Party: Liberal Party
- Spouse: Annie Henrietta Templer (m. 1842)
- Education: Trinity College, Cambridge (MA, 1834)

Sir Arthur William Buller (5 September 1808 – 30 April 1869) was a British Liberal Party Member of Parliament, who in his early career served as head of a commission of inquiry into education reform in Lower Canada.

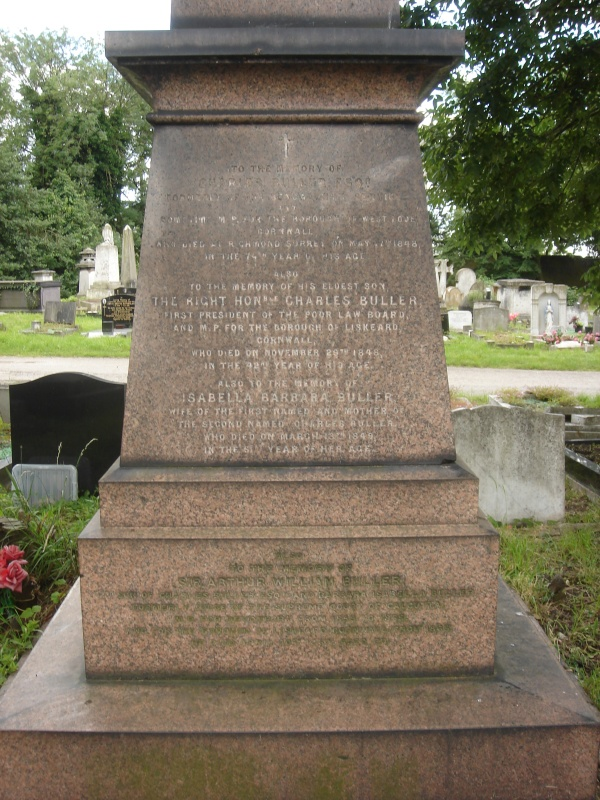
Funerary monument, Kensal Green Cemetery, London

== Background and education ==
Buller was born in Calcutta into a prominent Cornish family, the son of Charles Buller (1774–1848), MP for West Looe, and Barbara Isabella Kirkpatrick, daughter of General William Kirkpatrick. His elder brother was MP Charles Buller. He was educated at the University of Edinburgh and Trinity College, Cambridge, taking his MA in 1834, the same year he was called to the bar at Lincoln's Inn.

== Career ==
From 22 August – 2 November 1838, he served as a member of the Special Council that administered Lower Canada following the Lower Canada Rebellion. Buller also prepared a report that made recommendations on further directions for education in the province. Although many of his suggestions were implemented, two key elements of the report, encouraging the use of English over the French language and an emphasis on generic Christian rather than Roman Catholic religious education, were met with strong opposition.

After he left North America, Buller was crown attorney in Ceylon from 1840 to 1848. He was afterwards a judge of the Supreme Court of Calcutta in India from 1848 to 1858.

He was Member of Parliament for Devonport from 1859 to 1865, and for Liskeard from 1865 until his death in 1869.

Parliament of the United Kingdom
Preceded by Sir Michael Seymour; James Wilson	Member of Parliament for Devonport; 1859–1865; With: Sir Michael Seymour to 1859; William Ferrand from 1859	Succeeded by William Ferrand; Thomas Brassey
Preceded by Ralph Bernal Osborne	Member of Parliament for Liskeard; 1865 – 1869	Succeeded by Edward Horsman
Legal offices
Preceded by John Stark	Queen's Advocate of Ceylon; 1840–1848	Succeeded by Henry Collingwood Selby
