= Edmund Law Lushington =

British classical scholar and professor of Greek

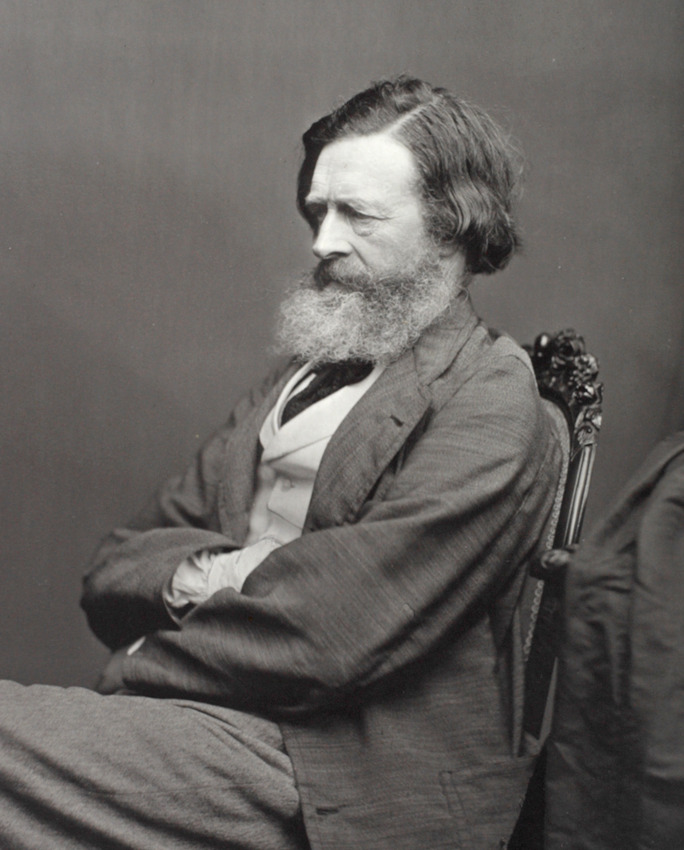
- ca 1870
- Born: 10 January 1811; Kent
- Died: 13 July 1893 (aged 82); Maidstone
- Occupation: Professor of Greek

Edmund Law Lushington (10 January 1811 – 13 July 1893) was a classical scholar, a professor of Greek, and Rector of the University of Glasgow.

== Life ==
Edmund Law Lushington was born on 10 January 1811 in Singleton, Lancashire, England. He was the son of Edmund Henry Lushington of the Inner Temple, a judge in Ceylon, and his wife Sophia Phillips. He was educated at Charterhouse School and as a Greek scholar at Trinity College, Cambridge, where he became a close friend of Alfred Lord Tennyson in the late 1820s.

A Fellow of Trinity College, Lushington went on to become a professor of Greek at the University of Glasgow (1837–74), where one of his students was Tiyo Soga

He was also later elected Lord Rector (1884–87). He died at Park House, Maidstone, on 13 July 1893.

== Family ==
On 14 October 1842, he married Cecilia Tennyson, daughter of Reverend George Clayton Tennyson, and younger sister of Alfred Lord Tennyson, in Boxley, Kent, England. To mark the occasion Tennyson wrote as an epilogue to his poem In Memoriam (1850), an epithalamium (nuptial poem) on Cecilia and Edmund's marriage. Lushington remained one of Tennyson's closest lifelong friends, as well as being his brother-in-law.

He had four children: Edmund ("Eddy"), Cecilia ("Zilly"), Emily ("Emmy"), and Lucy. Edward Lear made many gifts to the Lushington children included an album containing drawings of birds, animals and landscapes, which he presented to Zilly on her tenth birthday in 1855.

== Notes ==
Academic offices
Preceded by Henry Fawcett	Rector of the University of Glasgow; 1884–1887	Succeeded by Earl of Lytton
