= Augustus Nathaniel Lushington =

First African American to earn Veterinarian degree (1869–1939)

Augustus Lushington
- Born: August 1, 1869; Trinidad, British West Indies
- Died: 1939 (aged 69–70)
- Education: Cornell University; University of Pennsylvania School of Veterinary Medicine
- Occupation: Veterinarian

August Nathaniel Lushington (August 1, 1869 – 1939) became the first African American to earn a Doctor of Veterinary Medicine from the University of Pennsylvania School of Veterinary Medicine in 1897. He practiced about two years in Philadelphia and worked as an instructor in Veterinary Sanitation and Hygiene at Bell Mead Industrial and Agricultural College at Rock Castle, West Virginia. Later, he practiced for much of his career in segregated Lynchburg, Virginia. He had memberships in the statistical reporter to the Bureau of Animal Industry, the United States Department of Agriculture, and the Lychburg Chamber of Commerce.

== College education ==
His college education started when he married his wife Elizabeth Hubert from Antigua. Her West Indian friends helped Augustus enroll in Cornell University to study Agriculture. He graduated with a degree in Agriculture in 1894.

Since there was no work for him at the time he left the West Indies, he migrated to the United States. He graduated in three years from the University of Pennsylvania veterinary school. He was the only African American to graduate from the university. His portrait hangs at the main entrance of the Rosenthal building.
