= John Bridge (magistrate) =

British barrister and magistrate (1824–1900)

Sir John Bridge
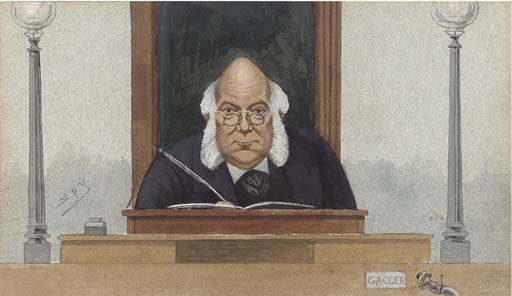

Chief Metropolitan Police Magistrate
- In office 1890–1899

Sir John Bridge (21 April 1824 – 20 April 1900) was a British barrister and police magistrate who was Chief Metropolitan Police Magistrate from 1890 to 1899.

The only son of John H. Bridge of Finchley, Middlesex, he was born on 21 April 1824. At Oxford, where he matriculated from Trinity College on 10 March 1842, he graduated B.A. (first class in mathematics) in 1846, and proceeded M.A. in 1849. On 10 April 1844 he was admitted student at the Inner Temple, and was there called to the bar on 25 January 1850.

He practised with some success on the home circuit, but in 1872 accepted the post of police magistrate at Hammersmith, where, as afterwards at Westminster (1880-1) and Southwark (1882-1886), he discharged the laborious duties of subordinate office with singular conscientiousness and discretion. Removed to Bow Street in 1887 he succeeded Sir James Ingham in 1890 as chief metropolitan magistrate, being at the same time knighted.

During his tenure of this office he committed for trial several offenders whose names are well known to the public, among them Oscar Wilde (5 April 1895), Jabez Balfour, the fraudulent director of the Liberator Building Society, on his extradition by the Argentine Republic (16 April 1895), and Dr. Jameson and his associates in the Transvaal raid (15 June 1896). In the exercise of his summary jurisdiction he well knew how to temper justice with mercy. Few British magistrates have more happily combined dignity and firmness with judicious and unobtrusive benevolence.

He retired from the bench early in 1900, and on 20 April in the same year died at his residence in Inverness Terrace, London, W. His remains were interred in the churchyard at Hedley, Surrey, in which parish his seat was situated. He married in 1857 his cousin, Ada Louisa, daughter of George Bridge of Merton, Surrey; she died on 1 March 1901.
