= William Edward Norris =

English fiction writer

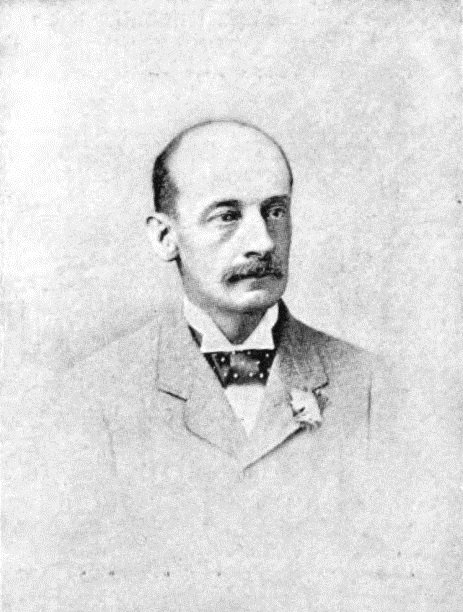
William Edward Norris.

William Edward Norris (18 November 1847 – 20 November 1925) was an English novelist and short story writer. His first story, Heap of Money, appeared in 1877, and was followed by a long series of novels and stories, many of which first appeared in the Temple Bar and Cornhill magazines.

== Life ==
William Edward Norris was born in London, the son of Sir William Norris, Chief Justice of Ceylon. He was educated at Eton, and called to the bar at the Inner Temple in 1874, though he never practised law.

Norris died on 20 November 1925 at his Torquay home.

== Works ==
Norris wrote over 60 novels; the Encyclopædia Britannica, 11th (ed), published in 1911, listed the following as his best to that date: Mademoiselle de Mersac (1880), Matrimony (1881), No New Thing (1883), My Friend Jim (1886), The Rogue (1888), The Despotic Lady (1895), Mathew Austin (1895), The Widower (1898), Nature's Comedian (1904) and Pauline (1908).

=== Novels ===
- Heaps of Money (1877). Also published as From Poverty to Wealth
- Mademoiselle de Mersac (1880)
- Matrimony (1881)
- No New Thing (1883)
- Thirlby Hall (1883)
- Adrian Vidal (1885)
- A Bachelor's Blunder (1886)
- My Friend Jim (1886)
- Major and Minor (1887)
- Chris (1888)
- The Rogue (1888)
- Miss Shafto (1889)
- Mrs. Fenton (1889)
- The Baffled Conspirators (1890)
- Marcia (1890)
- Misadventure (1890)
- Miss Wentworth's Idea (1891)
- Mr. Chaine's Sons (1891). Also published as The Brothers Three
- His Grace (1892)
- The Countess Radna (1893)
- A Deplorable Affair (1893)
- Matthew Austin (1894)
- Saint Ann's (1894)
- A Victim of Good Luck (1894)
- Billy Bellew (1895)
- Clarissa Furiosa (1897)
- The Dancer in Yellow (1896)
- The Fight for the Crown (1898)
- Marietta's Marriage (1897)
- The Widower (1898)
- Giles Ingilby (1899)
- The Flower of the Flock (1900)
- The Embarrassing Orphan (1901). Also published as An Embarrassing Orphan
- His Own Father (1901). Also published as The Distresses of Daphne
- The Credit of the County (1902)
- Lord Leonard the Luckless (1903)
- Nature's Comedian (1904)
- Nigel's Vocation (1904)
- Barham of Beltana (1905). Also published as Payment in Full and as After Many Years
- Lone Marie (1905)
- Harry and Ursula (1907)
- The Square Peg (1907)
- Pauline (1908)
- The Perjurer (1909)
- Not Guilty (1910)
- Vittoria Victrix (1911)
- Paul's Paragon (1912)
- The Right Honourable Gentleman (1913)
- Barbara and Company (1914)
- Troubled Tranton (1915). Also published as An Evil Inheritance
- Proud Peter (1916)
- Brown Amber (1917)
- The Fond Fugitives (1917)
- The Narrow Strait (1918)
- The Obstinate Lady (1919)
- The Triumphs of Sara (1920)
- Tony the Exceptional (1921)
- Sabine and Sabina (1922)
- Next of Kin (1923)
- The Conscience of Gavin Blane (1924)
- Trevalion (1925)
- Adrienne of Auxelles (1926)

=== Short story collections ===
- A Man of His Word, and other stories (1885)
  - A Man of his Word
  - La Bella Sorrentina
  - The Man with the Red Hair
  - Nils Jensen
  - The Princess Paolini
  - Count Waldemar
  - The Countess Adelcrantz
  - Mrs. Van Steen
  - The Old Woman of the Sea
- Jack's Father, and other stories (1891)
  - Jack's Father
  - The Romance of Paulilatino
  - Mysterious Mrs. Wilkinson
  - The Wingham Case
  - A Queer Business
  - Clever Lady Sophia
  - Poor Harry
- The Spectre of Strathannan (1895)
  - The Spectre of Strathannan
  - The Scamp's Parable
  - A Ghastly Predicament
  - Between the Two
  - The McCleverty
  - The Room without a Door
- The Despotic Lady, and others (1895)
  - The Despotic Lady
  - A Slight Misunderstanding
  - Old Jackson
  - A Three-Bottle Comedy
  - The Hermit of Saint-Eugène
  - An Unresolved Discord
- An Octave (1900)
  - Miser Morgan
  - The Tenant of Shag Rock
  - The First Lord and the Last Lady
  - A Daughter of the Hills
  - Citizens of the World
  - A Préfet of the Second Empire
  - In Good Faith
  - Prince Coresco's Duel

=== Short Stories in magazines, newspapers and anthologies ===
- Monsieur Bedeau
  - 1875 September, in The Cornhill Magazine Vol. 32
  - 1875 October 16/23, in Littell's Living Age Vol. 127
- La Bella Sorrentina
  - 1876 February, in The Cornhill Magazine Vol. 33
  - 1876 April 1, in Littell's Living Age Vol. 129
- Nils Jensen
  - 1877 March, in The Cornhill Magazine Vol. 35
  - 1877 April 14, in Littell's Living Age Vol. 133
- The Princess Paolini
  - 1877 September, in The Cornhill Magazine Vol. 36
  - 1877 October 6, in Littell's Living Age Vol. 135
- Count Waldemar
  - 1878 May, in The Cornhill Magazine Vol. 37
  - 1878 June 8, in Littell's Living Age Vol. 137
- Bianca (short story)
  - 1878 November, in Belgravia Vol. 37
  - 1878 December 28, in Littell's Living Age Vol. 139
  - 1896, in Stories by English Authors: Italy [Anthology]
- The Old Maid's Holiday
  - 1879 September, in Belgravia Vol. 39
- The Countess Adelcrantz
  - 1880 January, in The Cornhill Magazine Vol. 41
- Mrs. Van Steen
  - 1880 December, in The Cornhill Magazine Vol. 42
- Némorosa
  - 1881 September, in The Cornhill Magazine Vol. 44
- The Man with the Red Hair
  - 1882 January, in The Cornhill Magazine Vol. 45
  - 1882 February 18, in Littell's Living Age Vol. 152
- The Old Woman of the Sea
  - 1883 July, in The Cornhill Magazine Vol. 48
- The Romance of Paulilatino
  - 1883 September, in The Cornhill Magazine Vol. 48
- A Slight Misunderstanding
  - 1883 October, in The Cornhill Magazine Vol. 48
- The Philosopher's Daughter
  - 1884 January 17, in The Independent Vol. 36
- Man of his Word
  - 1884 Summer, in The Graphic
- An Algerian Episode
  - 1884 July 24, in The Independent Vol. 36
- The Hermit of Saint-Eugène
  - 1884 October, in Longman's Magazine Vol. 4
  - 1884 October 25, in Littell's Living Age Vol. 163
- That Terrible Man aka A Terrible Man
  - 1884 November/December & 1885 January, in The English Illustrated Magazine Vol. 2
- Mysterious Mrs. Wilkinson
  - 1885 July, in The Cornhill Magazine Vol. 52
- Miss Wyndham
  - 1885 July 9, in The Independent Vol. 37
- The Colonel's Mother
  - 1886 January 21, in The Independent Vol. 38
- A Diplomatic Victory
  - 1886 April, in Longman's Magazine Vol. 7
  - 1886 May 15, in Littell's Living Age Vol. 169
- The Wingham Case
  - 1886 June, in The Cornhill Magazine Vol. 53
- Her Own Doing
  - 1886 Summer, in The Graphic
- In Good Faith
  - 1886 July, in The Cornhill Magazine Vol. 54
- Prince Coresco's Duel
  - 1886 August, in Longman's Magazine Vol. 8
  - 1886 September 18, in Littell's Living Age Vol. 170
- The Spectre of Strathannan
  - 1886 Christmas, in The Witching Time [Annual]
- The King's Double
  - 1886 September 2, in The Independent Vol. 38
- Clever Lady Sophia
  - 1887 April, in Longman's Magazine Vol. 9
- All Ye that Pass By
  - 1887 May 28/June 4, in The Illustrated London News
- Robinson's Friend
  - 1887 Christmas, in The Graphic
- An Absolute Lunatic
  - 1888 January 19, in The Independent Vol. 40
- A Queer Business
  - 1888 February, in Longman's Magazine Vol. 11
- Jack's Father
  - 1888 May/June, in Murray's Magazine Vol. 3
- Poor Harry
  - 1888 September, in Longman's Magazine Vol. 12
  - 1888 October 27, in Littell's Living Age Vol. 179
- La Belle Américaine (short story)
  - 1888 December, in The English Illustrated Magazine Vol. 6
- The Duffer
  - 1889 June 8, in The Nottinghamshire Guardian
  - 1890, in Twenty Novelettes [Anthology]
  - 1894 August 31/September 7, in The Middlesex Courier
  - 1894, in A Dozen All Told [Anthology]
  - 1895 December, in Short Stories Vol. 20
- Invisible Mr. Morgan (29 June 1889, @ Genealogybank)
  - 1889 November 30, in Manchester Weekly Times Supplement
- Mr. Gregory's Misadventure
  - 1889 December, in Atalanta Vol. 3
- The Old Brown Mare
  - 1890 March, in The English Illustrated Magazine Vol .7
- An Innocent Chaperone
  - 1891 January, in Longman's Magazine Vol. 17
- The Romance of Madame de Chanteloup
  - 1891 April 11, in Black and White Vol. 1
  - 1891 November 21, in The Newcastle Courant
  - 1891 November 21, in The Hampshire Telegraph and Sussex Chronicle
  - 1893, in Stories From Black And White [Anthology]
- The Room Without a Door
  - 1891 May 22, in Manchester Weekly Times Supplement
  - 1892 January 22, in Blackheath Gazette
- Quite Impossible (26 July 1891, @ NewspaperArchive)
  - 1891 August 1, in Black and White Vol. 2
  - 1892 January 23, in The Newcastle Courant
  - 1892 January 23, in The Hampshire Telegraph and Sussex Chronicle
  - 1894, in Miss Parson's Adventure [Anthology]
  - 1898 April 23, in The Nottinghamshire Guardian
  - 1900 August 11, in The Hampshire Telegraph Supplement
- Ambitious Mrs. Willatts
  - 1891 August, in Longman's Magazine Vol. 18
- The Musical Mouse
  - 1891 October 3, in Black and White Vol. 2
  - 1901, in Strange Happenings [Anthology]
- The Philosopher's Son
  - 1891 December 5, in Black and White Vol. 2
  - 1901, in Strange Happenings [Anthology]
- A Tough Job (13 December 1891, @ Genealogybank) aka *The Lies that Failed
- The Late Viscount Brent
  - 1892 November 25/December 2, in Manchester Weekly Times Supplement
  - 1892 November 25/December 2, in The Middlesex Courier
  - 1892 November 26/December 3, in The Leeds Mercury Weekly Supplement
  - 1892 November 26/December 3, in The Derby Daily Telegraph
- The Scamp's Parable
  - 1893 April 1, in The Newcastle Courant
  - 1894 August 11, in The Derby Daily Telegraph
- Between the Two
  - 1893 July 8, in The Newcastle Courant
- The Nethergate Tragedy
  - 1893 July 26, in The Pall Mall Gazette
- A Candidate for Martyrdom
  - 1893 August, in The Pall Mall Magazine Vol. 1
- A Three-Bottle Comedy
  - 1893 October, in Longman's Magazine Vol. 22
  - 1893 December 9, in Littell's Living Age Vol. 199
  - 1894 April, in Short Stories Vol. 15
- A Partie Carrée
  - 1893 December, in Harper's New Monthly Magazine Vol. 88
- Kaddour
  - 1893 December, in The English Illustrated Magazine Vol. 11
- The McCleverty
  - 1894 January 12, in Manchester Weekly Times Supplement
  - 1894 January 13, in The Penny Illustrated Paper
- Old Jackson
  - 1894 March, in Good Words 1894
- Her Ladyship's Veil
  - 1894 May, in The Pall Mall Magazine Vol. 3
- The Tug of War
  - 1894 June, in Harper's New Monthly Magazine Vol. 89
- A Ghastly Predicament
  - 1894 June 16, in The Nottinghamshire Guardian
- An Unresolved Discord
  - 1894 October, in Longman's Magazine Vol. 24
  - 1894 November 17, in Littell's Living Age Vol. 203
- The Despotic Lady
  - 1894 November 10/17/24 & 1 December 1/8, in The Graphic
- The Tenant of Shag Rock
  - 1895 June, in Longman's Magazine Vol. 26
- My Fellow-Poacher
  - 1895 August, in The Badminton Magazine Vol. 1
- Sir William's Wife
  - 1895 December, in The English Illustrated Magazine Vol. 14
- Miser Morgan
  - 1896 February, in Longman's Magazine Vol. 27
  - 1896 February 22, in Littell's Living Age Vol. 208
- Scandalous Martha
  - 1896 February, in Chapman's Magazine Vol. 3
- The King's Cousin
  - 1896 February 15, in The Leeds Mercury Weekly Supplement
  - 1896 February 15/22, in The Newcastle Courant
  - 1896 February 15/22, in The Nottinghamshire Guardian
- The Dowager's Companion
  - 1896 June, in Harper's New Monthly Magazine Vol. 93
- Topper (short story)
  - 1896 July, in Badminton Magazine Vol. 3
- The Three Aspirants
  - 1896 November, in The Lady's Realm Vol. 1
- The Beneficient Blunderer
  - 1896 November 7, in The Leeds Mercury Weekly Supplement
  - 1896 November 7, in The Nottinghamshire Guardian
- The Anarchical Clerk
  - 1896 November 14, in The Nottinghamshire Guardian
- The Two Noels
  - 1896 December 12, in The Nottinghamshire Guardian
  - 1896 December 12, in The Leeds Mercury Weekly Supplement
  - 1896 December 26, in The Bristol Mercury Weekly Supplement
- A Christmas Bonfire (13 December 1896, @ Genealogybank)
  - 1896 Christmas, in The Yorkshire Weekly Post
  - 1899 March 4, in The Whitstable Times and Herne Bay Herald as The Matchmaker
- A Half Genius
  - 1896 Christmas, in The Graphic
- A Simple Soul
  - 1897 April, in The Lady's Realm Vol. 1
- Hard Luck (short story)
  - 1897 May 8, in The Illustrated London News
- A Préfet of the Second Empire
  - 1897 Summer, in The Graphic
- A Sorrowful Sonneteer
  - 1897 November, in The Lady's Realm Vol. 3
- The Christmas Diamond (1897 December 9/10)
  - 1903 December 23, in The Manchester Evening News
- The Princess's Betrothal
  - 1898 January 8, in The Newcastle Courant
  - 1898 January 8, in The Manchester Courier Weekly Supplement
  - 1900 July 7, in The Whitstable Times and Herne Bay Herald
  - 1900 July 16/17, in The Shields Daily Gazette and Shipping Telegraph
- The Lady of the Manor
  - 1898 July 9, in The Nottinghamshire Guardian
  - 1898 July 9, in The Bristol Mercury Weekly Supplement
  - 1899 January 11, in The Taunton Courier
- A Daughter of the Hills
  - 1898 September 3, in The Illustrated London News
- A Seafaring Philosopher
  - 1898, in The Sketch Christmas Number
- The First Lord and the Last Lady
  - 1899 February, in Longman's Magazine Vol. 33
- Miss Bob
  - 1899 March 30, in Hearth and Home
  - 1899 April 1, in The Newcastle Courant
  - 1900 February 24, in The Manchester Courier Weekly Supplement
  - 1902 February 1, in The Whitstable Times and Herne Bay Herald
- Citizens of the World
  - 1899 April 8, in The Illustrated London News
- When Thieves Fall Out
  - 1899 May 20, in The Illustrated London News
  - 1900, in The Ladysmith Treasury [Anthology]
- Among Thieves
  - 1899 May 27/June 3, in Harper's Weekly Vol. 43 (as Amongst Thieves)
  - 1899 June 3/10, in The Graphic
- Mrs. Le Grand
  - 1899 Summer, in The Graphic
- The Widow's Might
  - 1899 July 22, in The Nottinghamshire Guardian
  - 1899 July 22, in The Hampshire Telegraph Supplement
  - 1899 July 22, in The Manchester Evening News
  - 1903 March 20, in Leamington Spa Courier
- Vincenzo's Triumph
  - 1899 November 23, in The Independent Vol. 51
- Filia Pulchrior
  - 1900 March, in Longman's Magazine Vol. 35
- The Errors of the Wise
  - 1900 April 14, in The Newcastle Courant
  - 1900 July 5, in Hearth and Home
  - 1902 November 22, in The Whitstable Times and Herne Bay Herald
- Sir William the Silent
  - 1900 Summer, in The Graphic
- The Day of His Glory
  - 1900 December 1, in The Sphere Vol. 3
- The Heroic Revivalists
  - 1901 January, in Longman's Magazine Vol. 37
- The Deputy Mendicant
  - 1901 January 26, in The Illustrated London News
- The Lovers' Meeting
  - 1901 Sep 28, in The Norfolk News
  - 1903 February 7, in The Whitstable Times and Herne Bay Herald
- An Unworthy Stratagem
  - 1901 December 7, in The Illustrated London News
- Mrs. Gilbert's Puppets
  - 1901 Christmas, in The Graphic
- First or Second
  - 1902 Jan 3, in The Lancashire Daily Post
  - 1902 January 4, in The Manchester Courier Weekly Supplement
- Mr. Brough's Client
  - 1902 October, in The Cornhill Magazine Vol. 86
- The Elusive Coronet
  - 1903 July 4, in Cardiff Times and South Wales Weekly News
- The Roses of Christmas (19 December 1903, @ Trove)
- The Courageous Coward
  - 1904 May 28, in The Graphic Vol. 69
- The Butler Intervenes (1904 December 24, @ PapersPast) (cf The Beneficient Blunderer, 1896)
- The Mulcted Millionaire
  - 1905 May 27, The Derby Daily Telegraph
- An Uncharted Reef
  - 1905 August, in Longman's Magazine Vol. 46
- A Repentant Defaulter (27 September 1905, @ PapersPast) (cf All Ye that Pass By, 1887)
- Fifteen Drops
  - 1905 December, in The Cornhill Magazine Vol. 92
  - 1905 May 27, in The Daily Telegraph
- The Reforming of Lady Wynchcombe
  - 1906 January 3, in The Bystander Vol. 9
- Sir Robert & the Adventuress
  - 1906 March 23, in Daily Mail
- The Perdition of Peter Sherard
  - 1906 April 14/21, in The Illustrated London Magazine
- My Own Petard (31 August 1906, @ PapersPast)
  - 1913 June, in The English Illustrated Magazine Vol. 49
- The King and the Anarchist
  - 1906 October, in The Cornhill Magazine Vol. 94
- The Princess's Eyebrow
  - 1906 December 5, in The Bystander Vol. 12
- The Thieves' Terror
  - 1907 May, in The Strand Magazine Vol. 33
- Mascali the Avenger
  - 1907 July, in The London Magazine Vol. 18
- The Coward
  - 1907 August, in The Blue Book Magazine Vol. 5
- A Base Conspiracy (28 December 1907, @ Trove)
- The Heart of the Editor
  - 1908 January 25, in The Queen Vol. 123
  - 1908 January 25, in Burnley Express
  - 1908 February, in Every Where Vol. 21
  - 1908 September, in Short Stories Vol. 70
- The Fiddler's Fortune
  - 1908 July 17, in T. P.'s Weekly Vol. 12
- The Missing Links
  - 1908 August, in The Cornhill Magazine Vol. 98
- The Fellow-Lodgers
  - 1909 April 10, in The Queen
- The Girl with Only One Talent
  - 1909 June, in The Cornhill Magazine Vol. 99
- The Mummers of Marpleton (4 December 1909, @ Trove)
- A Change of Partners (25 February 1910, @ Trove)
- The Strayed Bishop
  - 1910 October 22, in Cardiff Times and South Wales Weekly News
  - 1910 October 22, in The Weekly Times
- Too Pretty (10 December 1910, @ Trove)
  - 1911 December 1, in Nuneaton Observer Xmas Supplement
- The Magic Mistletoe (17 December 1910, @ Trove)
- A Christmas Blizzard [1910, in The Croydon Chronicle Christmas Number]
  - 1912 December 14, in The Irish Weekly
- The Refractory Prince
  - 1911 February 4, in The Queen Vol. 11
- Wily Miss Wilton (27 May 1911, @ PapersPast)
  - 1915 July, in The Canadian Magazine Vol. 45
- Florinda's Christmas Eve
  - 1911 December 14, in Belfast Weekly News
  - 1918 December, in The Canadian Magazine Vol. 52
- The Black Spectre
  - 1912 March, in The Pall Mall Magazine Vol. 49
  - 1914 January 31, in The Tamworth Herald
- Two at Sea
  - 1912 March 30, in Bristol Times and Mirror
  - 1913 June 14, in The Crediton Chronicle
- Befogged (27 July 1912, @ PapersPast)
- Too Much Weight (22 March 1913, in The Weekly Tale-Teller)
- On and Off Guard (8 November 1913, @ PapersPast)
- Friendship's Penalty
  - 1913 December, in The Cornhill Magazine Vol. 108
- Star Sapphira (1913 December 23/24, @ Trove)
- The Lady and the Burglar
  - 1914 April 18, in The Queen Vol. 135
- A Peasant of Lorraine
  - 1914 Oct, in The Cornhill Magazine Vol. 110
  - 1914 Nov 7, in The Living Age Vol. 283
- The Hedonic Old Lady (24 October 1914, @ Trove)
  - 1914 November 14, in The Queen Vol.136
  - 1918 April 17, in Taunton Courier
- A Christmas Arbitration (19 December 1914, @ Trove)
- The Guiltless Murderer
  - 1915 April 17, in The Queen Vol.137
- The Incriminating Weapon (25 September 1915, @ Trove)
- The Truce of God (11 December 1915, @ Trove)
  - 1915 December 25, in The Walsall Observer
- The Charming Miscreant
  - 1916 Jul 29, in The Queen Vol.140
- The Christmas After (23 December 1916, @ Trove)
- Jan Issel
  - 1917 January, in The Cornhill Magazine Vol. 115
- Two Christmas Days
  - 1917, in Holly Leaves Christmas Number of The Illustrated Sporting and dramatic News
- The Dark House
  - 1917 December, in The Canadian Magazine Vol. 50
- Bobby in the Snow
  - 1917 December 29, in Irish Weekly Mail
- The Warning Blast
  - 1918 March 16, in The Weekly Freeman St. Patrick's Day Number
- The Sublime Ass (12 June 1920)
- A Carol in Two Flats (24 December 1920, @ PapersPast)
  - 1920 December 25, in The Blackburn Times
- The Insurgent Revellers (14 January 1922, @ Trove)
  - 1921 January 29, in The Weston-Super-Mare Gazette
- The Strategic Parson (9 April 1921, in The Newcastle Weekly Chronicle)
  - 1922 April 15, in The Walsall Observer
  - 1925 January 27, in Buchan Observer
- The Appalling Passenger (15 July 1922, @ Trove)
- Irresistible Mr. Annett
  - 1923 January 12, in Shipley Times and Express
- By Mutual Consent (15 September 1923, @ Trove)
- The Willingham Van Dyck (2 February 1924)
- A Hater of Women (12 October 1924)
  - 1925 September 19, in The Derby Daily Telegraph
- A Victim of Impulse (25 April 1925, @ Trove)
- The Involuntary Absconders (12 September 1925, @ Trove)
- Two Sons of France
  - 1926 April 7, in Taunton Courier
- Robbery by Request (3 August 1926)
- A Modest Machiavelli
  - 1934 November 2, in The Somerset Standard
  - 1937 October 12, in Penrith Observer
