= Henry Byerley Thomson =

12th Queen's Advocate of Ceylon

12th Queen's Advocate of Ceylon
- In office 3 May 1858 – 1863
- Governor: Henry George Ward
- Preceded by: Henry Collingwood Selby
- Succeeded by: Richard Morgan

Henry Byerley Thomson (1822–1867) was an English barrister and jurist, and the 12th Queen's Advocate of Ceylon. Initially Henry William Thomson, in 1846 he added his mother's maiden name, and was known as Henry Byerley Thomson or Henry William Byerley Thomson.

== Life ==
He was the son of Anthony Todd Thomson by his second wife Katharine Byerley, whose surname he assumed in later life, and was born in May 1822; the orientalist John Cockburn Thomson (1834–1860) was his younger brother. He was educated at University College, London, and at Jesus College, Cambridge, where he graduated with a B.A. in 1846. He was called to the bar at the Inner Temple in May 1849, and practised on the northern circuit. He specialised in military and international law.

Thomson lived at this period at 8 Serjeant's Inn, Temple, although professional success seemed distant; but then he was appointed by the Colonial Secretary Lord Stanley as Queen's Advocate in Ceylon. He was appointed on 3 May 1858, succeeding Henry Collingwood Selby, and held the office until 1863. He was succeeded by Richard Morgan.

Thomson was then promoted to puisne judge of the supreme court of Colombo. He died at Colombo, as the result of an apoplectic seizure, on 6 January 1867.

== Works ==
Thomson's major work was a digest of the law as administered in Ceylon, Institutes of the Laws of Ceylon (London, 1866, 2 vols.). He published also:

- Laws of War affecting Commerce and Shipping (1854, two editions).
- The Military Forces and Institutions of Great Britain and Ireland: their Constitution, Administration, and Government, Military and Civil, (1855), based on parliamentary bluebooks.
- The Choice of a Profession: a concise Account and comparative Review of the English Professions (1857).

== Family ==
Thomson married, in 1858, Sarita Beaumont, and left two sons: Henry Byerley, who took orders in 1888; and Arthur Byerley.

Legal offices
Preceded by Henry Collingwood Selby	Queen's Advocate of Ceylon; 1858–1863	Succeeded by Richard Morgan
