= University of Pennsylvania School of Veterinary Medicine =

American veterinary school

- Other name: Penn Vet
- Type: Private
- Established: 1884
- Parent institution: University of Pennsylvania
- Dean: Andrew M. Hoffman, DVM, DVSc, DACVIM
- Location: 3800 Spruce Street, Philadelphia, PA, 19104, USA; 39.949818°N 75.199956°W
- Campus: Urban
- Nickname: Penn Vet
- Website: www.vet.upenn.edu

The University of Pennsylvania School of Veterinary Medicine (branded as Penn Vet) is the veterinary school of the University of Pennsylvania. Penn Vet is one of only two Ivy League veterinary schools in the United States. Established in 1884, Penn Vet is the only veterinary school developed in association with a medical school, and is one of only four private veterinary schools in the nation.

Penn Vet's two campuses, located in Philadelphia and Kennett Square, Pennsylvania offer students learning opportunities in companion animal medicine at the Matthew J. Ryan Veterinary Hospital and large animal medicine at New Bolton Center.

As part of the University of Pennsylvania, Penn Vet is a partner in its biomedical research and teaching centers. Students can learn first-hand how veterinary medicine and research impacts human lives, as well as those of animals.

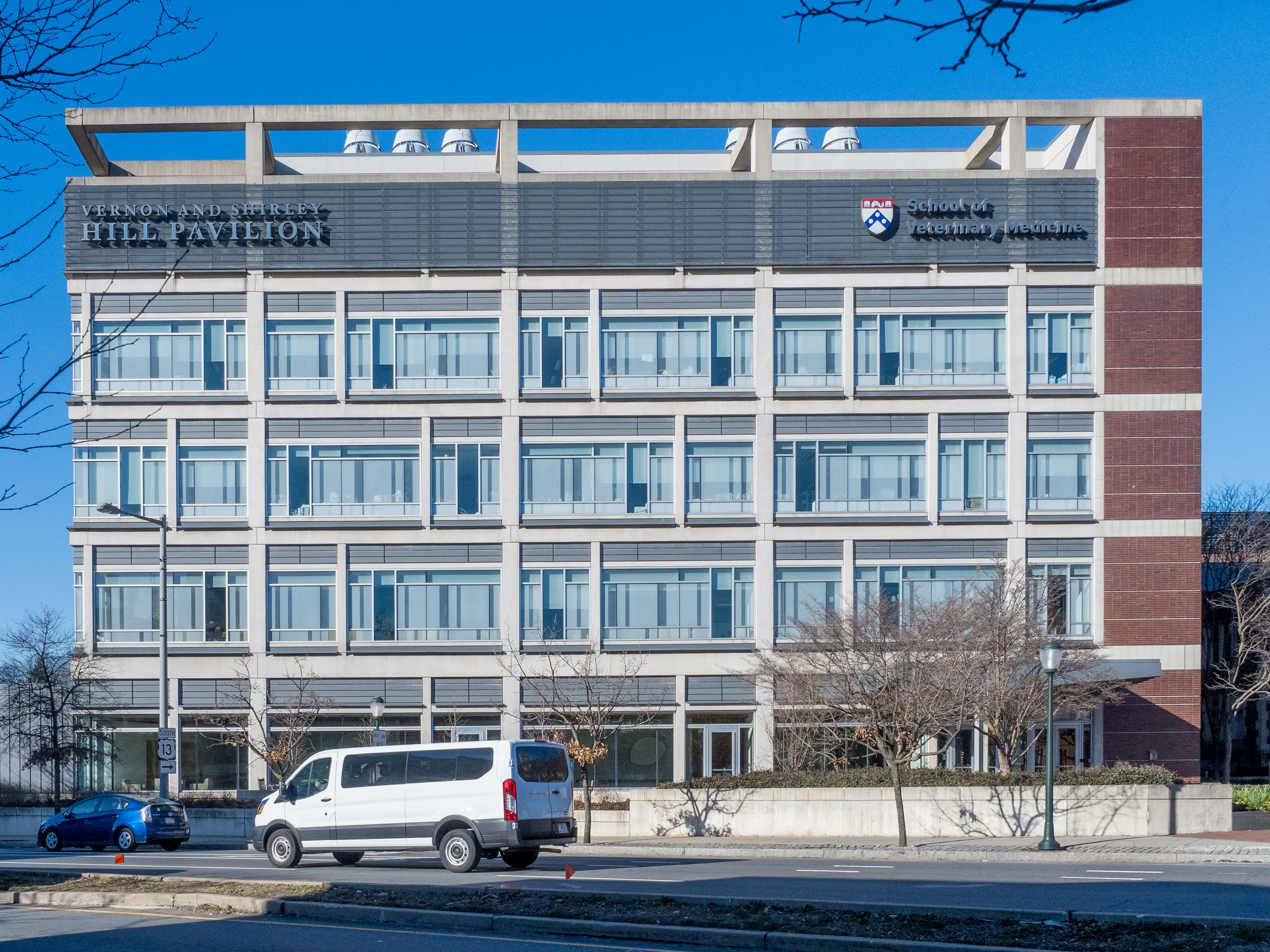
(2024)

Over 7,000 veterinarians have graduated from the school, the only veterinary school in Pennsylvania. The school awards the Veterinariae Medicinae Doctoris (VMD) degree rather than a Doctor of Veterinary Medicine (DVM). It also offers a VMD-PhD program among other dual degrees.

Since 1935, Penn Vet has offered courses for advanced work in veterinary pathology leading to master and doctoral degrees in conjunction with and cooperation by Penn Med.

== Notable alumni ==
- Ralph L. Brinster, first veterinarian to win the National Medal of Science
- Augustus Nathaniel Lushington, first African American veterinarian
- David Wolfgang, former State Veterinarian of Pennsylvania
- Evan L. Stubbs, detected the first case of avian influenza in the United States

== See also ==
- Veterinary medicine in the United States
