= Codrington Edmund Carrington =

Chief Justice of British Ceylon from 1801 to 1806 and politician

Sir Codrington Edmund Carrington
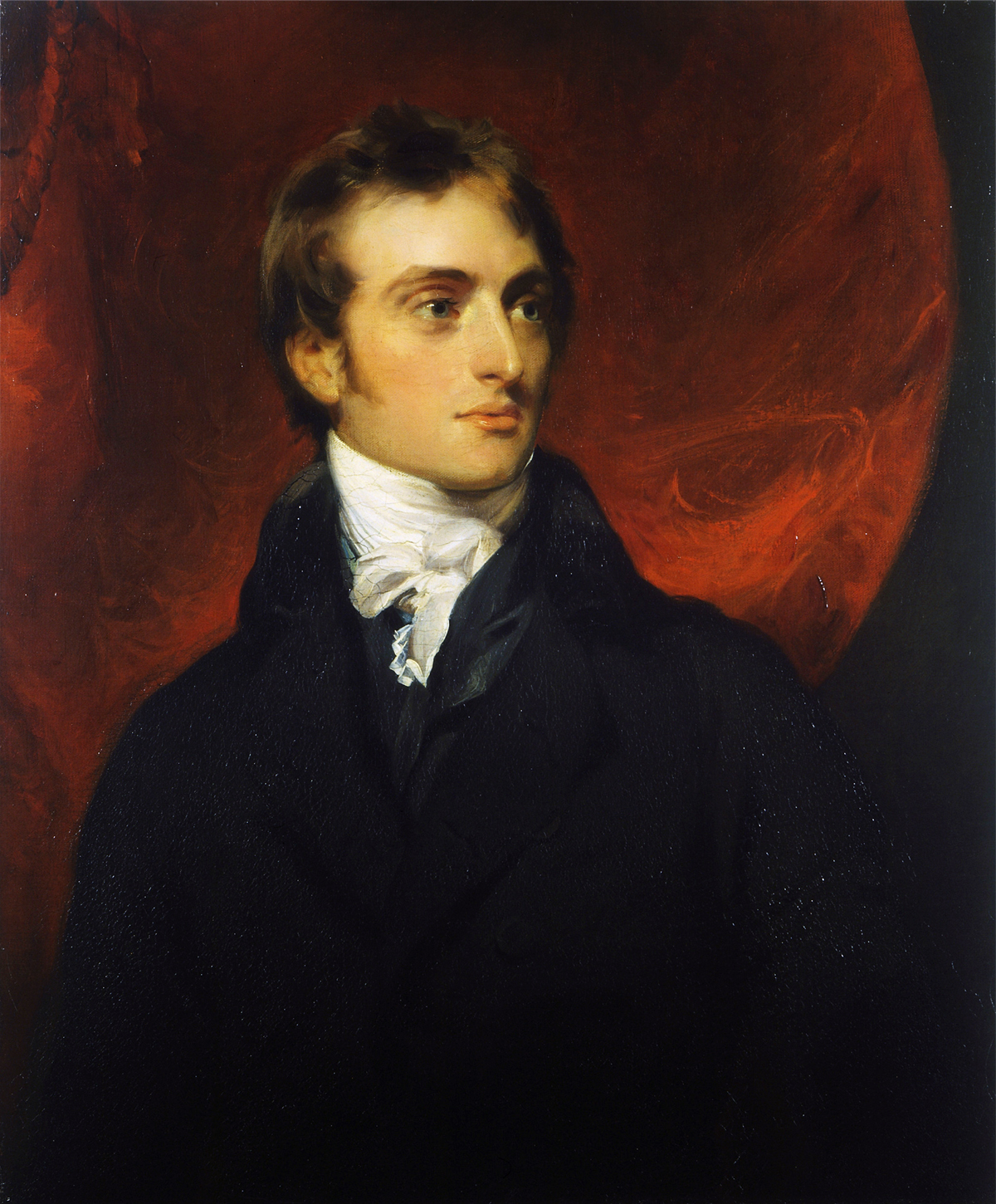
- Codrington Edmund Carrington, 1801 portrait by Thomas Lawrence

1st Chief Justice of Ceylon
- In office 1801 – March 1806
- Preceded by: Position established
- Succeeded by: Edmund Henry Lushington

Personal details
- Born: 22 October 1769 Longwood, Hampshire
- Died: 28 November 1849 (aged 80) Exmouth
- Education: Winchester College

Sir Codrington Edmund Carrington, FRS, FSA (22 October 1769 – 28 November 1849) was a British barrister, judge and politician.

== Life ==
He was the son of Codrington Carrington, of the Blackmoor estate on Barbados, and the eldest daughter of the Rev. Edmund Morris, rector of Nutshalling, the friend of Lady Hervey; and was born at Longwood, Hampshire, on 22 October 1769. He was educated at Winchester College and called to the bar at the Middle Temple on 10 February 1792. In the same year he went to India, where, being admitted an advocate of the supreme court of judicature, he for some time acted at Calcutta as junior counsel to the East India Company, and made the acquaintance of Sir William Jones.

Carrington returned to England for health reasons in 1799. In 1800, still in England, he was called on to prepare a code of laws for Ceylon, and was then appointed the first chief justice of the supreme court of judicature that had been created. He was knighted before he embarked on his outward voyage.

In 1806 Carrington was compelled by bad health to resign his post, and declined other colonial appointments. Having purchased an estate in Buckinghamshire, he became a magistrate and deputy-lieutenant of that county, where he acted for many years as chairman of the quarter sessions. He was created DCL and elected Fellow of the Royal Society, Fellow of the Society of Antiquaries of London, and honorary member of the Société Française Statistique Universelle.

In June 1826 Carrington was elected Tory M.P. for St. Mawes, which he continued to represent till 1831. During his last years he resided mainly at St Helier in Jersey. He died at Exmouth on 28 November 1849.

== Works ==
After the Manchester riots of 1819 Carrington published Inquiry into the Law relative to Public Assemblies of the People. He was also the author of a Letter to the Marquis of Buckingham on the Condition of Prisons (1819), and other pamphlets.

Legal offices
New office	Chief Justice of Ceylon; 1801–1806	Succeeded by Edmund Henry Lushington
