= Edmund Henry Lushington =

Chief Justice of British Ceylon from 1807 to 1809

2nd Chief Justice of Ceylon
- In office 1807–1809
- Preceded by: Codrington Edmund Carrington
- Succeeded by: William Coke; As Acting

Puisne Justice of the Supreme Court of Ceylon
- In office 1801–1806

Personal details
- Born: 11 July 1766 Park Place, Kent, England
- Died: 27 March 1839 (aged 72) Park House, Kent
- Spouse(s): Louisa Faulkner Phillips; Sophia Phillips
- Relations: Henry Lushington
- Children: Eight daughters and four sons
- Education: Queens' College, Cambridge

Edmund Henry Lushington (11 July 1766 – 27 March 1839) was the second Chief Justice of Ceylon.

He was the son of Rev James Lushington of Rodmersham, Kent and his wife Mary Law, daughter of Edmund Law, Bishop of Carlisle.

He became a barrister-at-law and later a bencher of the Inner Temple. In 1806, he was appointed a puisne judge in Ceylon. He was elevated to Chief Justice of Ceylon in 1807, serving until 1809, when he was succeeded by William Coke as acting Chief Justice.

On his return to England, he served as Chief Commissioner of the Colonial Audit Board and as Master of the Crown Office. In 1824, he was elected a Fellow of the Royal Society.

He died in 1839. He had married twice; first to Louisa, the daughter of Faulkner Philips of Manchester (who died in 1801), and later to Sophia, daughter of Thomas Philips of Sedgeley, near Manchester. He had eight daughters and four sons, including Sir Franklin Lushington and Henry Lushington.

Legal offices
Preceded by Codrington Edmund Carrington	Chief Justice of Ceylon; 1807-1809	Succeeded by William Coke; As Acting
Preceded by	Puisne Justice of the Supreme Court of Ceylon; 1801–1806	Succeeded by
