= General Hodgson =

General Hodgson may refer to:

- Henry Hodgson (British Army officer) (1868–1930), British Army major general
- John Hodgson (British Army officer) (1757–1846), British Army general
- Studholme Hodgson (1708–1798), British Army general
- Studholme John Hodgson (c. 1803–1890), British Army general
