= Governor Hodgson =

Governor Hodgson may refer to:

- Frederick Mitchell Hodgson (1851–1928), Governor of the Gold Coast from 1898 to 1900, Governor of Barbados from 1900 to 1904, and Governor of British Guiana from 1904 to 1911
- John Hodgson (British Army officer) (1757–1846), Governor of Bermuda from 1806 to 1810

== See also ==
- Arnold Hodson (1881–1944), Governor of the Falkland Islands from 1926 to 1930, Governor of Sierra Leone from 1931 to 1934, and Governor of the Gold Coast from 1934 to 1941
