= General Waters =

General Waters may refer to:

- John Waters (British Army officer, born 1774) (1774–1842), British Army lieutenant general
- John Waters (British Army officer, born 1935) (born 1935), British Army general
- John K. Waters (1906–1989), United States Army four-star general
