= William Sankey =

British Army general

General William Sankey CB
- Born: c. 1822
- Died: 16 November 1892; Biarritz, France
- Relatives: Matthew Henry Phineas Riall Sankey (son)
- Military career
- Allegiance: United Kingdom
- Branch: British Army
- Rank: General
- Commands: Sialkot District; Presidency District
- Conflicts: Crimean War
- Awards: Companion of the Order of the Bath

General William Sankey CB (died 16 November 1892) was a British Army officer who served as colonel of the King's Own Royal Regiment (Lancaster).

== Military career ==
Sankey was commissioned as an ensign in the British Army in 1844. He saw action as Deputy Assistant Quartermaster General and then as Assistant Quartermaster General at the Battle of Alma in September 1854, the Battle of Balaclava in October 1854 and the Siege of Sevastopol in Winter 1854 during the Crimean War. He was made Colonel of the 9th Regiment of Foot in 1862.

He became General Officer Commanding the Sialkot District in India in May 1873 and General Officer Commanding the Presidency District in January 1874. Made a General in 1881, he served as colonel of the King's Own (Royal Lancaster Regiment) (1890–92).

He died in Biarritz in 1892, aged 70.

Military offices
Preceded by Studholme John Hodgson	Colonel of the King's Own (Royal Lancaster Regiment); 1890–1892	Succeeded by William Wilby
