= William Wilby =

British Army general

Major-General William Wilby CB

26th General Officer Commanding, Ceylon
- In office 1879–1882
- Preceded by: John Alfred Street
- Succeeded by: John Chetham McLeod

Personal details
- Born: c. 1820
- Died: 15 December 1893 London
- Awards: Companion of the Order of the Bath

Military service
- Allegiance: United Kingdom
- Branch/service: British Army
- Rank: Major-General
- Commands: General Officer Commanding, Ceylon
- Battles/wars: Indian Rebellion; British Expedition to Abyssinia

Major-General William Wilby CB (c. 1820 – 15 December 1893) was the General Officer Commanding, Ceylon.

== Military career ==
Wilby was commissioned as an ensign in the British Army on 27 May 1836. He saw action in the Crimean War and commanded the right wing of his regiment at Gujarat and Sindh during the Indian Rebellion in 1857. He was present at the Battle of Aroghee and at the Battle of Magdala in April 1868 during the British Expedition to Abyssinia and went on to be General Officer Commanding, Ceylon from 1879 to 1882. He afterwards served as colonel of the King's Own (Royal Lancaster Regiment) (1892–93).

Military offices
| Preceded by John Alfred Street | General Officer Commanding, Ceylon; 1879–1882 | Succeeded by Sir John Chetham McLeod |
| Preceded by William Sankey | Colonel of the King's Own (Royal Lancaster Regiment); 1892–1893 | Succeeded by William Gordon Cameron |
