= William Forster (British Army officer) =

British Army officer (1798–1879)

General William Forster KH
- Born: 17 December 1798
- Died: 8 June 1879 (aged 80)
- Military career
- Allegiance: United Kingdom
- Branch: British Army
- Service years: 1813–1871
- Rank: General
- Unit: 85th Regiment of Foot
- Awards: Knight of the Royal Guelphic Order

General William Frederick Forster KH (17 December 1798 – 8 June 1879) was a senior British Army officer who served as Military Secretary from 1860 to 1871.

== Military career ==
Brought up in Berwick-upon-Tweed, Forster was commissioned into the 85th Regiment of Foot in 1813. In 1830 he was appointed Groom of the Bedchamber for the Duke of Gloucester.

He became Deputy Adjutant-General in Ireland in 1854. He was appointed Deputy Adjutant-General in 1855, and then Military Secretary in 1860, retiring from that post in 1871. He was promoted to general in 1874.

Forster was also Colonel of the 81st Regiment of Foot. He died in 1879.

Military offices
| Preceded by Sir Charles Yorke | Military Secretary; 1860–1871 | Succeeded by Caledon Egerton |
| Preceded by Thomas Evans | Colonel of the 81st Regiment of Foot (Loyal Lincoln Volunteers); 1863–1879 | Succeeded by Henry Renny |
