= Charles Yorke (British Army officer) =

Senior British Army officer (1790–1880)

Field Marshal Sir Charles Yorke GCB
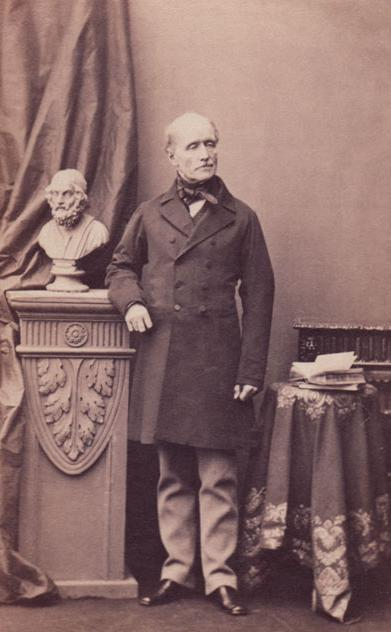
- Born: 7 December 1790
- Died: 20 November 1880 (aged 89); Mayfair, London
- Burial place: Kensal Green Cemetery, London
- Military career
- Allegiance: United Kingdom
- Branch: British Army
- Service years: 1808–1860
- Rank: Field Marshal
- Conflicts: Napoleonic Wars; Peninsular War; Hundred Days; Xhosa Wars
- Awards: Knight Grand Cross of the Order of the Bath

Field Marshal Sir Charles Yorke GCB (7 December 1790 – 20 November 1880) was a senior British Army officer. He fought in many of the battles of the Peninsular War and of the Hundred Days, seeing action as an extra aide-de-camp to Major-General Frederick Adam, commander of the 3rd Light Brigade, at the Battle of Waterloo. After that he became Deputy Commander of the British forces in South Africa during the latter stages of the Eighth Xhosa War. He went on to be Military Secretary, ultimately earning promotion to field marshal for his competence in that role.

== Military career ==
Born the son of Colonel John Yorke and Juliana Yorke (née Dodd), Yorke was commissioned as an ensign in the 35th Regiment of Foot on 22 January 1808. Promoted to lieutenant on 18 February 1808, he transferred to the 52nd Light Infantry and served with that Regiment in the Peninsular War. During the War he was at present at the Battle of Vimeiro in August 1808, the Battle of Fuentes de Oñoro in May 1811, the Battle of Ciudad Rodrigo in January 1812 and at the Battle of Badajoz in April 1812, where he was wounded. After recovering, he went on to take part in the Battle of Salamanca in July 1812, the Battle of Vitoria in June 1813, the Battle of the Pyrenees in July 1813, the Battle of Nivelle in November 1813 and the Battle of the Nive in December 1813. After promotion to captain on 20 January 1814, he also fought at the Battle of Orthez in February 1814, where he was again wounded.

Yorke also fought during the Hundred Days and served as an extra aide-de-camp to Major-General Frederick Adam, Commander of the 3rd Light Brigade, at the Battle of Waterloo in June 1815.

Yorke transferred to the 13th Regiment of Foot on 7 August 1817 and exchanged back to the 52nd Light Infantry on 2 July 1818. Promoted to major in an unattached company on 9 June 1825, he became Inspecting Officer of Militia with the rank of lieutenant colonel on 30 November 1826. Promoted to colonel on 23 November 1841, he became assistant quartermaster-general in Cork and later in Manchester. In 1850 he was sent to South Africa as Deputy Commander of the British forces there, serving under General George Cathcart: he took part in the latter stages of the Eighth Xhosa War taking responsibility for rear area security and logistic support for the troops in the Transkei. He was promoted to major-general on 11 November 1851.

Yorke became Military Secretary in May 1854 (initially to Viscount Hardinge and then to the Duke of Cambridge) and, having been appointed Knight Commander of the Order of the Bath on 5 February 1856 and promoted to lieutenant general on 13 February 1859, he retired from active service in June 1860. He was advanced to Knight Grand Cross of the Order of the Bath on 29 June 1860 and appointed to a Royal Commission established in March 1863 to examine whether there had been any departures from the measures put in place to reorganise the Indian Army and merge it with the British Army following the Indian Mutiny. Promoted to full general on 5 September 1865, he was appointed Constable of the Tower in April 1875, a post he took up in July 1875, before being promoted to field marshal on 2 June 1877.

Yorke was Colonel of the Duke of Wellington's Regiment (1855–1863) and then of the 2nd Battalion, the Rifle Brigade (Prince Consort's Own). He died at South Street in Mayfair on 20 November 1880 and was buried at Kensal Green Cemetery.

== Family ==
Yorke never married and never had any children.

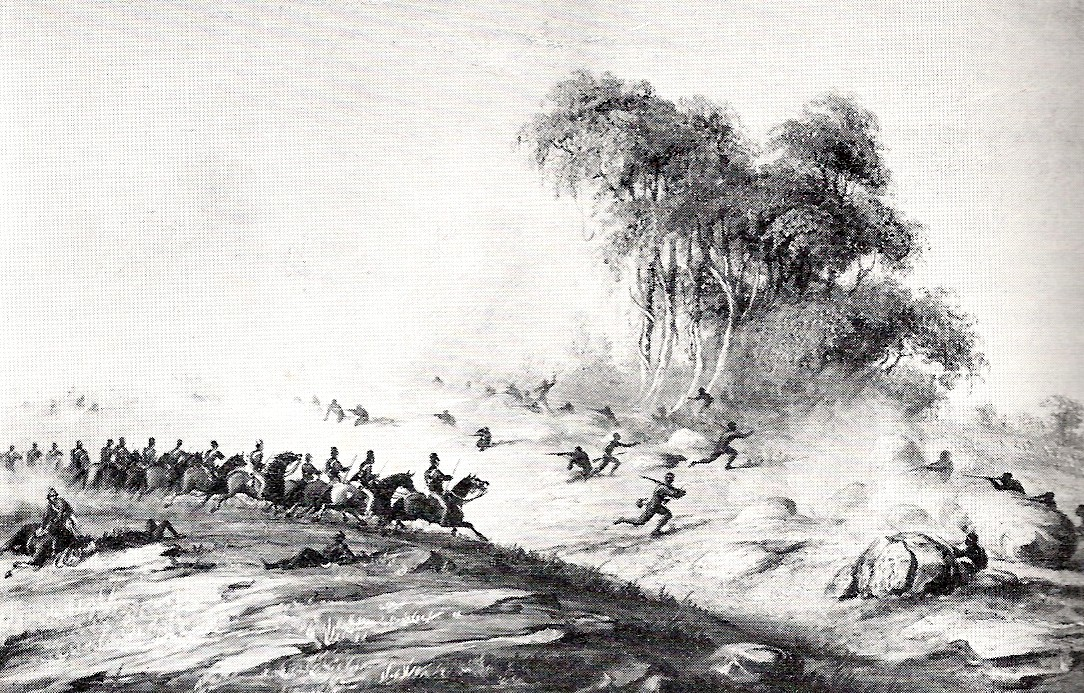
The Cape Mounted Riflemen charging the enemy at Waterkloof during the 8th Xhosa War: Yorke had responsibility for rear area security and logistic support for the troops in the Transkei during the War

== Sources ==
- Heathcote, Tony (1999). The British Field Marshals, 1736–1997: A Biographical Dictionary. Barnsley: Leo Cooper. ISBN 0-85052-696-5.

Military offices
Preceded by Richard Airey	Military Secretary; 1854–1860	Succeeded by William Forster
Preceded by Henry D'Oyly	Colonel of the 33rd (The Duke of Wellington's) Regiment of Foot; 1855–1863	Succeeded by William Nelson Hutchinson
Preceded by Sir George Brown	Colonel-Commandant of the 2nd Battalion, The Prince Consort's Own Rifle Brigade; 1863–1880	Succeeded by Sir Alfred Horsford
Honorary titles
Preceded by Sir William Maynard Gomm	Constable of the Tower; Lord Lieutenant of the Tower Hamlets; 1875–1880	Succeeded by Sir Fenwick Williams
