= Victoria Road drill hall, Ulverston =

Former military institution in England

Victoria Road drill hall
- Ulverston
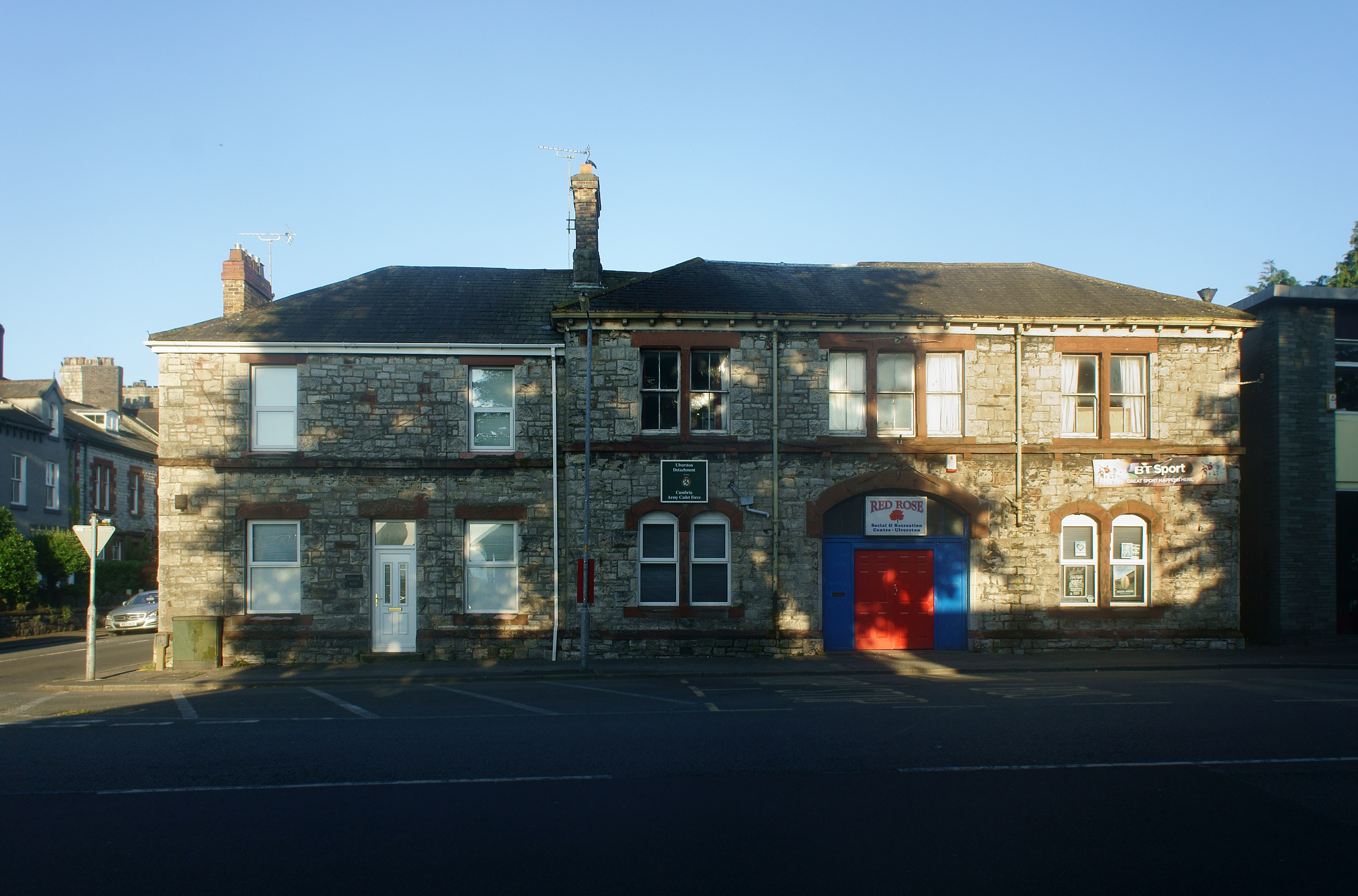
- Victoria Road drill hall, Ulverston

Site information
- Type: Drill hall

Location
- Location in South Lakeland Location in Cumbria
- Coordinates: 54.19337°N 3.09390°W

Site history
- Built: 1873
- Built for: War Office
- In use: 1873-c.1938

The Victoria Road drill hall is a former military installation in Ulverston, Cumbria, England.

== History ==
The building was designed as the headquarters of the 37th Lancashire Rifle Volunteers and completed in 1873. This unit evolved into the 4th Battalion the King's Own Royal Regiment (Lancaster) in 1908. The battalion was mobilised at the drill hall in August 1914 before being deployed to the Western Front. The battalion was disbanded shortly before the Second World War and the drill hall was made available for recreational use. It is now the Red Rose Social and Recreation Centre.
