= King's Own Royal Regiment (Lancaster) =

Infantry regiment of the British Army

- c. 1902 regimental cap badge
- Active: 1680–1959
- Country: England (1680–1707); Great Britain (1707–1800); United Kingdom (1801–1959)
- Branch: English Army (1680–1707); British Army (1707–1959)
- Type: Infantry
- Role: Line infantry
- Size: Regiment
- Garrison/HQ: Bowerham Barracks, Lancaster
- Nicknames: Barrell's Blues, The Lions
- Colours: Blue Facings, Gold Braided Lace
- March: Quick: Corn Riggs are Bonnie; Slow: And Shall Trelawny Die?
- Engagements: Monmouth Rebellion; Williamite War in Ireland; Nine Years' War; War of the Spanish Succession; Jacobite rising of 1745; Seven Years' War; American War of Independence; French Revolutionary and Napoleonic Wars; War of 1812; Crimean War; British colonial conflicts; World War I; World War II

The King's Own Royal Regiment (Lancaster) was an infantry regiment of the British Army. It was raised in 1680 as the 2nd Tangier Regiment, a line infantry regiment of the English Army's Tangier Garrison, before being renamed the Duchess of York and Albany's Regiment of Foot in 1684 and the Queen's Regiment of Foot in 1685. The regiment served in the suppression of the Monmouth Rebellion in 1685 and suffered large-scale desertions to William of Orange during his 1688 invasion of England. After William became the new English monarch in 1689 the regiment fought for him in the Williamite War in Ireland and Nine Years' War.

During the War of the Spanish Succession the regiment became a marine unit in 1702, being renamed the Queen's Regiment of Marines, before reverting to line infantry and its former name in 1711. Following the ascension of George I to the British throne the regiment was again renamed to the King's Own Regiment of Foot. The regiment spent most of the next three decades in Great Britain and served in the War of the Austrian Succession and the suppression of the Jacobite rising of 1745. In 1751 it was renamed the 4th (The King's Own) Regiment of Foot and subsequently served the Seven Years' War, American War of Independence, French Revolutionary and Napoleonic Wars and War of 1812.

During the Victorian era the regiment was stationed in Australia and India before serving in the Crimean War. It subsequently participated in the British expedition to Abyssinia and Anglo-Zulu War before being renamed the King's Own (Royal Lancaster Regiment) in 1881 as a result of the Cardwell Reforms. The regiment served in the First World War before being renamed the "King's Own Royal Regiment (Lancaster)" in 1921 and serving in the Second World War. In 1959 the regiment was amalgamated with the Border Regiment to form the King's Own Royal Border Regiment.

== History ==
=== Formation ===
Authorisation to recruit the regiment was given on 13 July 1680 to the Earl of Plymouth, an illegitimate son of Charles II; its nominal strength was 1,000 men, half recruited in London by Lieutenant-Colonel Charles Trelawny and half from the West Country. Raised for service in the Tangier Garrison, it was known as the 2nd Tangier Regiment; Plymouth died shortly after arriving in Tangier and Edward Sackville assumed command, with Trelawney formally appointed as colonel in 1682. Tangier was abandoned in 1684 and on returning to England, the regiment was renamed as the Duchess of York and Albany's Regiment of Foot; after James II became monarch in 1685, this changed to the Queen's Regiment of Foot.

During the Monmouth Rebellion, it fought at Sedgemoor in July 1685; during the 1688 invasion of England by William of Orange Trelawny and half the regiment deserted to William. He was briefly replaced by the loyalist Charles Orby, then reinstated when James went into exile. From 1690 to 1691, it served in the Williamite War in Ireland, including the Battle of the Boyne and sieges of Cork and Limerick. When the war ended with the October 1691 Treaty of Limerick, it returned to England.

Transferred to Flanders in March 1692, it took part in the latter stages of the 1689 to 1697 Nine Years' War. The regiment fought at the battles of Steenkerque in August 1692, and Landen in July 1693 and the Siege of Namur in summer 1695. After the Treaty of Ryswick in 1697, it was reduced in strength and used to garrison Plymouth and Penryn.

=== 18th century ===
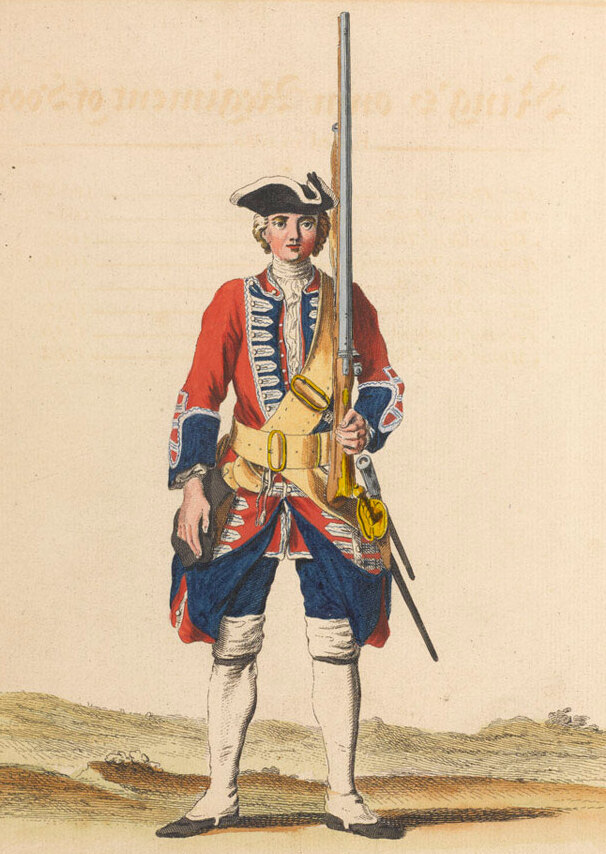
c. 1742 engraving of a regimental private

When the War of the Spanish Succession began in 1702, it was reformed as a regiment of marines and fought at the Battle of Vigo Bay in October 1702 and the capture of Gibraltar in August 1704. In 1711, it was redesignated line infantry and took part in the Quebec Expedition. In what remains one of the worst naval disasters in British history, the fleet ran aground in thick fog and over 890 men lost, including 200 members of the regiment.

Following the accession of George I to the British throne in 1714 the regiment was renamed as the King's Own Regiment of Foot and spent the next 30 years in Scotland and England. Sent to Flanders in 1744 during the War of the Austrian Succession, it garrisoned Ghent and when the Jacobite rising of 1745 broke out in August, it was transferred to Scotland. The regiment took part of the pursuit of the Jacobite forces on their retreat back into Scotland in December 1745, including the ensuring Clifton Moor Skirmish. The regiment then fought at the Battle of Falkirk Muir in January 1746. At the Battle of Culloden in April, it was based in the front line and took the brunt of the Jacobite charge; it suffered the heaviest casualties on the government side, with 18 dead and 108 wounded. The regiment's commander, Sir Robert Rich, was among the wounded, losing his left hand. Lord Robert Kerr, captain of the regiment's grenadier company, was among the dead. The two Regulation Colours (flags) carried by the regiment during the battle both survive and are now part of the collection of the National Museum of Scotland. The Regiment introduced the Loyal and Friendly Society of Orange and Blew to commemorate the victories at the Battle of Culloden and Boyne in 1732 and a full list of members wearing the society medal has been compiled.

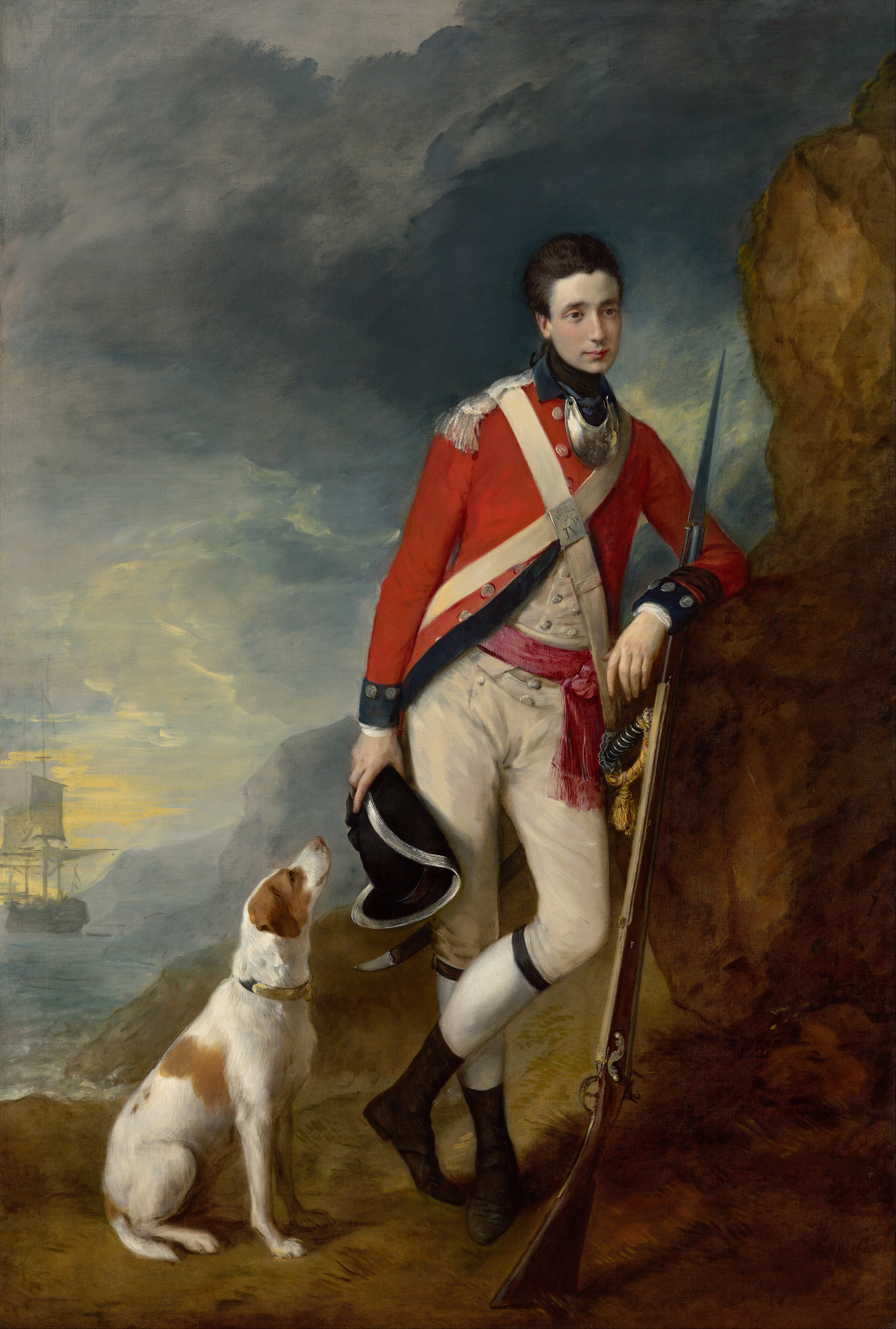
1776 portrait of a regimental ensign

Following the army reforms of 1751, the regiment was retitled 4th (The King's Own) Regiment of Foot. At the start of the Seven Years' War in 1756, it was part of the Menorca garrison; forced to surrender in June it was transported to Gibraltar. It spent the rest of the war in the West Indies, taking part in the capture of Guadeloupe, Martinique and Saint Lucia before returning home in July 1764. When the American Revolutionary War began in 1775, it was sent to North America; over the next three years, it took part in numerous actions, including Lexington and Concord, Bunker Hill, Long Island and the Battle of White Marsh in December 1777. The first British soldiers to die in the American Revolution were arguably three members of the light company of the 4th Foot, who died at Concord Bridge in 1775. In early 1778, it returned to Saint Lucia where it was part of the garrison during the December 1778 naval battle of St. Lucia, part of the Anglo-French War.

=== French Revolutionary and Napoleonic Wars ===
A regimental grenadier in 1805

The regiment was sent to Nova Scotia in May 1787 and took part in the capture of Saint Pierre and Miquelon in May 1793. After returning to England, it embarked for the Netherlands in September 1799 and fought at the Battle of Alkmaar in October 1799 during the Anglo-Russian invasion of Holland.

The regiment was sent to Portugal in August 1808 for service in the Napoleonic Wars and fought under General Sir John Moore at the Battle of Corunna in January 1809, before being evacuated to England later that month. It returned to the Peninsula in October 1810 where it fought at the Siege of Badajoz in March 1812, the Battle of Salamanca in July 1812 and the Battle of Vitoria in June 1813 as well as the Siege of San Sebastián in September 1813. It then pursued the French Army into France and saw action at the Battle of the Nivelle in November 1813 and at the Battle of the Nive in December 1813. It embarked for North America in June 1814 for service in the War of 1812 and saw action at the Battle of Bladensburg in August 1814, the Burning of Washington later in August 1814 the Battle of Baltimore in September 1814, and the Battle of New Orleans in January 1815, as well as the capture of Fort Bowyer in February 1815. It briefly returned to England in May 1815, before embarking for Flanders a few weeks later to fight at the Battle of Waterloo in June.

=== Victorian era ===
Regimental officers in c. 1885

Regimental troops entering Ladysmith, 1900

Detachments of the regiment were used as guards upon convict ships travelling to Australia, with the detachments arriving from 1832. Detachments were stationed in Sydney, Tasmania, Victoria, South Australia and Swan River. The regiment was relieved in 1837 and headed to India. During the Crimean War, the regiment fought at the Battle of Alma in September 1854 and Battle of Inkerman in November 1854 and took part in the Siege of Sevastopol in winter 1854. It also served in the 1868 British expedition to Abyssinia and 1879 Anglo-Zulu War.

The regiment was not fundamentally affected by the Cardwell Reforms of the 1870s, which gave it a depot at Bowerham Barracks in Lancaster from 1873, or by the Childers Reforms of 1881 – as it already possessed two battalions, there was no need for it to amalgamate with another regiment. Under the reforms the regiment became the King's Own (Royal Lancaster Regiment) on 1 July 1881. After the Childers reforms took effect, the regiment contained the following battalions:

- 1st Battalion (Regular)
- 2nd Battalion (Regular)
- 3rd (1st Royal Lancashire Militia) Battalion based in Lancaster, from the 1st Bn of the former 1st Royal Lancashire Militia (The Duke of Lancaster's Own) based in Lancaster
- 4th (1st Royal Lancashire Militia) Battalion, from the 2nd Bn of the former Militia
- 1st Volunteer Battalion based in Ulverston, former 10th Lancashire Rifle Volunteer Corps

The 2nd Battalion embarked for South Africa in December 1899, to serve in the Second Boer War, and saw action at the Battle of Spion Kop in January 1900. The 3rd and 4th Militia battalions were embodied and embarked for South Africa in February and January 1900 respectively. In 1908 the Volunteers and Militia were reorganised nationally, with the former becoming the Territorial Force and the latter the Special Reserve; the regiment now had one Reserve and two Territorial battalions. (Note: These were the 3rd Battalion (Special Reserve), with the 4th Battalion at Victoria Road in Ulverston and the 5th Battalion at Phoenix Street in Lancaster (both Territorial Force))

=== First World War ===
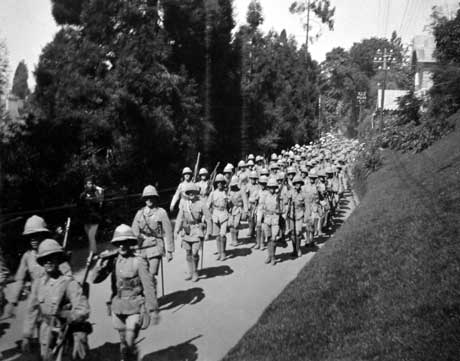
Regimental troops in India, 1914

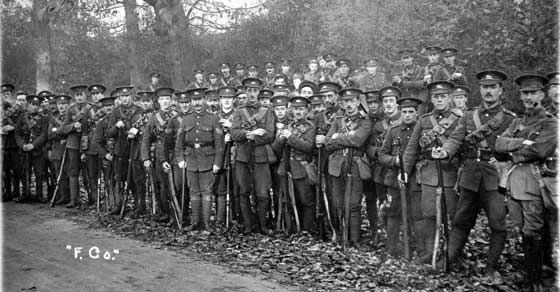
Regimental troops at Sevenoaks, 1914

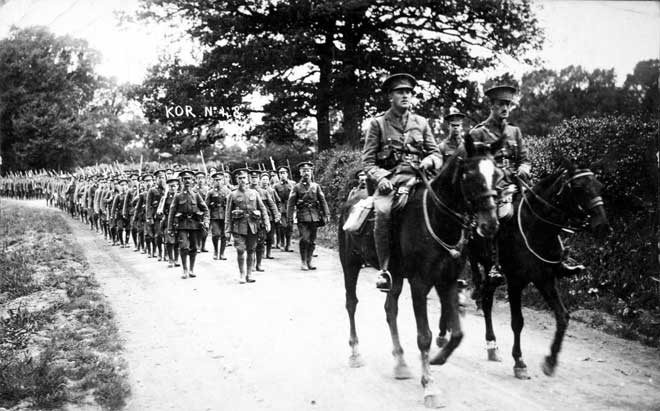
Regimental troops in Bournemouth, 1914-1915

The regiment raised 14 Territorial and New Army battalions during the First World War.

==== Regular Army battalions ====
The 1st Battalion landed at Boulogne in August 1914 as part of the 12th Brigade in the 4th Division of the British Expeditionary Force. It was nearly destroyed as a fighting unit at the Battle of Le Cateau on 26 August 1914, when it suffered some 400 casualties in a single two minute burst of machine gun fire. It served on the Western Front for the rest of the war.

The 2nd Battalion returned from India in December 1914 and landed at Le Havre in January 1915 as part of the 83rd Brigade in the 28th Division. It took heavy casualties at the Battle of Frezenberg in May 1915 before moving to Egypt in October 1915 and then to Salonika.

==== Special Reserve (formerly Militia) battalion ====
The 3rd (Reserve) Battalion remained in the United Kingdom throughout the war and supplied drafts of trained infantrymen as replacements to the regular battalions that were serving overseas.

==== Territorial battalions ====
The 1/4th Battalion was mobilised in the 164th (North Lancashire) Brigade of the 55th (West Lancashire) Division; it was temporarily attached to 154th (3rd Highland) Brigade in 51st (Highland) Division and landed in France in May 1915; it returned to 164 Brigade in January 1916. The 1/5th Battalion was mobilised in the 164th (North Lancashire) Brigade of the 55th (West Lancashire) Division; it landed in France in February 1915 and was temporarily attached to 28th Division and 1st Division; it returned to 166th (South Lancashire) Brigade in the 55th Division in January 1916.

The 2/4th Battalion was formed September 1914 as a 2nd Line duplicate of 1/4th Battalion; it became the 4th (Reserve) Battalion and absorbed 5th (Reserve) Battalion 1916; it was stationed in Dublin from June 1918. The 2/5th Battalion was formed September 1914 as a 2nd Line duplicate of 1/5th Battalion; it was attached to the 164th (North Lancashire) Brigade of the 55th (West Lancashire) Division February 1915, then to 170th (2/1st North Lancashire) Brigade of 57th (2nd West Lancashire) Division; it landed in France February 1917.

The 3/4th Battalion was formed June 1915 as a reserve battalion; it amalgamated with 2/4th Battalion in January 1916. The 3/5th Battalion was formed June 1915 as a reserve battalion; it remained in the United Kingdom and supplied drafts of trained infantrymen to the 1/5th and 2/5th battalions; it 5th (Reserve) Battalion. The 12th Battalion was formed on 1 January 1917 from the 41st Provisional Battalion (TF) in 218th Brigade of the 73rd Division, a Home Defence formation; it was disbanded in March 1918.

==== Kitchener's Army battalions ====
The 6th (Service) Battalion was formed in August 1914; it was attached to 38th Brigade in 13th (Western) Division; it landed at Gallipoli July 1915 and later served in Mesopotamia. The 7th (Service) Battalion was formed in September 1914; it was attached to 56th Brigade in 19th (Western) Division; it landed in France in July 1915 and was disbanded February 1918 due to an Army-wide reorganisation.

The 8th (Service) Battalion was formed in October 1914; it was attached to 76th Brigade in 25th Division; it landed in France in September 1915 and served on the Western Front for the war: it helped to slow the German Advance at the Battle of St. Quentin on 21 March 1918. The 9th (Service) Battalion was formed in October 1914; it was attached to 65th Brigade in 22nd Division and served in Salonika.

The 10th (Reserve) Battalion was formed in October 1914; it remained in the United Kingdom and supplied drafts to the Service battalions overseas; it converted into 43rd Training Reserve Battalion in September 1916. The 11th (Service) Battalion was formed in August 1915 as a Bantam battalion; it was attached to 120th Brigade in 40th Division; it landed in France in June 1916 and was disbanded in February 1918. The 12th (Reserve) Battalion was formed in January 1916; it remained in the United Kingdom and supplied drafts to the Service battalions overseas; it converted into 76th Training Reserve Battalion in September 1916.

=== Inter-War ===
Regimental troops in Burma, 1920s

In 1921, the regiment was re-designated the King's Own Royal Regiment (Lancaster).

=== Second World War ===
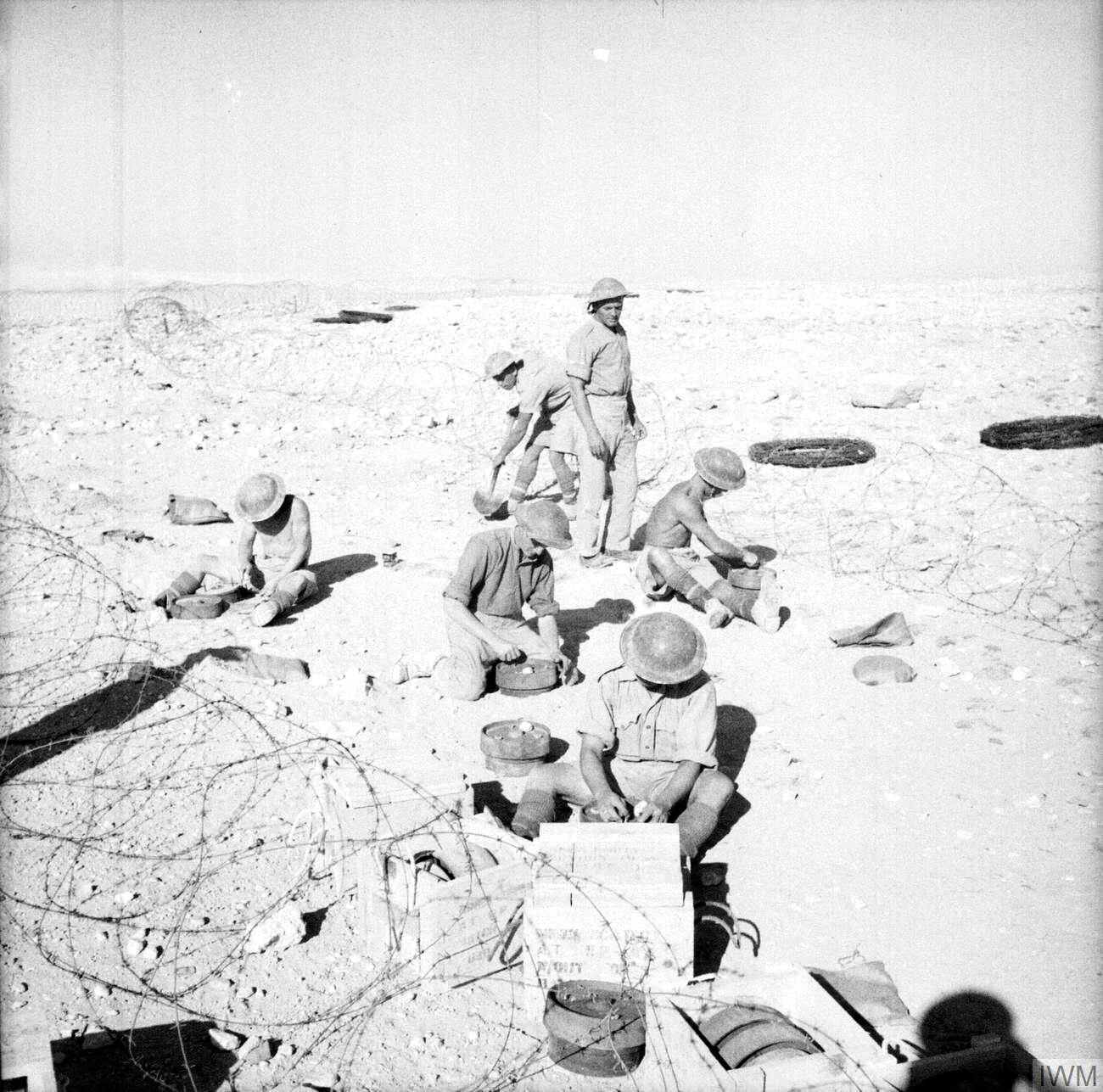
Regimental troops in Egypt, 1940

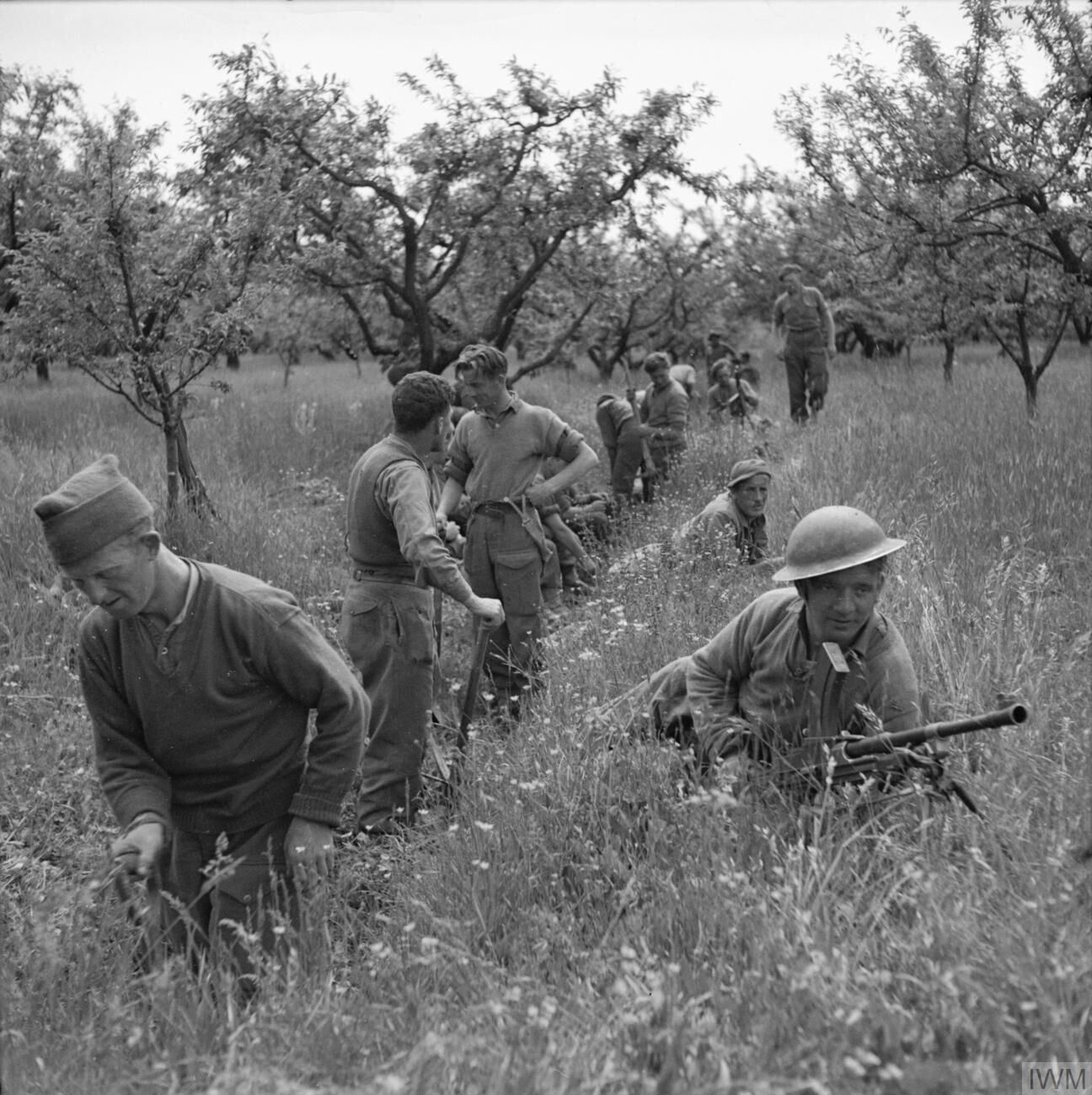
Regimental troops in Italy, 1945

The following battalions served during the Second World War:

==== Regular Army battalions ====
Regimental troops defending in Tobruk, 1941

The 1st Battalion, King's Own was stationed in Malta on the outbreak of war, moving to Karachi in British India at the end of 1939. It later served with the 17th Indian Infantry Brigade. It subsequently served in Iraq and Syria with 25th Indian Infantry Brigade, with which it served until October 1943, of 10th Indian Infantry Division. In August 1942, the battalion embarked from Egypt for Cyprus, but the transport was torpedoed and the troops had to return and re-embark later. In May 1943, the battalion returned to Syria, and then it joined 234th Infantry Brigade in the Aegean Islands in October 1943. Here, the bulk of the battalion was captured by the Germans on 16 November, after the Battle of Leros, with only 57 officers and men managing to escape the island. The 1st Battalion was reformed in 25th Indian Infantry Brigade, on 30 January 1944, by amalgamating with the 8th Battalion, King's Own. The reformed battalion, under the command of Lieutenant Colonel Richard Neville Anderson, later served in the Italian Campaign with 25th Indian Brigade for the rest of the war.

The 2nd Battalion formed part of the British garrison of Jerusalem when war broke out. It joined 14th Infantry Brigade in Palestine in March 1940 and moved with it to Egypt in July. The battalion served with 16th Infantry Brigade of 6th Infantry Division (later redesignated 70th Infantry Division) in the defence of Tobruk and later formed part of the garrison of Ceylon. In September 1943, the battalion was stationed with 70th Division at Bangalore in India when it was selected for attachment to the second Long Range Penetration or Chindits brigade (111th Indian Infantry Brigade) for the Burma Campaign. It formed 41 and 46 Columns in the Second Chindit Campaign, crossing into Burma in March 1944 and being flown out to India in July 1944. From November 1944 to February 1945, the battalion was assigned to 14th Airlanding Brigade in 44th Indian Airborne Division.

==== Territorial Army battalions ====
The 4th Battalion, King's Own Royal Regiment was transferred to the Royal Artillery and converted to artillery in November 1938, forming the 56th (King's Own) Anti-Tank Regiment, Royal Artillery. On the outbreak of war, the 56th Anti-Tank Regiment mobilised in the 42nd (East Lancashire) Division, with which it served in the Battle of France in May 1940 and was evacuated at Dunkirk. In 1942, it was sent to join 70th Infantry Division in India, where it was converted into a Light Anti-Aircraft/Anti-Tank Regiment in 1943. In this guise, it served in the Burma Campaign, mainly with 5th Indian Infantry Division. It reconverted to the anti-tank role in late 1944 and in June 1945 it returned to India as a Royal Artillery training unit.

In June 1939, the 56th Anti-Tank Regiment spun off a duplicate unit, the 66th Anti-Tank Regiment, which served in Home Forces throughout the war, mainly with the 55th (West Lancashire) Infantry Division. In September 1941, the 56th and 66th Anti-Tank Regiments each provided a battery to help form a new regiment for overseas service, 83rd Anti-Tank Regiment. This regiment served in Iraq, Palestine and Egypt.

Before the war, the 5th Battalion, King's Own transferred from 164th (North Lancashire) Infantry Brigade, 55th (West Lancashire) Infantry Division to 126th (East Lancashire) Infantry Brigade, 42nd (East Lancashire) Infantry Division. The battalion, under the command of Lieutenant Colonel Hayman Hayman-Joyce, mobilised with the rest of the 42nd Division and served with the British Expeditionary Force in the battles of France and Belgium in 1940. When the division was converted to armour, becoming the 42nd Armoured Division, in October 1941, 5th Battalion was transferred to the Royal Armoured Corps and became the 107th Regiment Royal Armoured Corps. The regiment continued to wear the King's Own cap badge on the black beret of the Royal Armoured Corps, as did all infantry units converted in this way. However, the regiment was disbanded in December 1943 and a few of its officers and men were sent to 151st Regiment Royal Armoured Corps, which had been converted from the 10th Battalion, King's Own.

==== Hostilities-only battalions ====
The 6th, 7th, 8th and 9th Battalions were all formed in 1940 as pioneer battalions and raised specifically for hostilities-only. All four units served with the British Expeditionary Force as GHQ (General Headquarters) troops during the 1940 campaign in both France and Belgium.

After being evacuated at Dunkirk, the 6th Battalion later served in a succession of Home Forces formations: 218th Independent Infantry Brigade (Home), 48th Division, 54th Division, 76th Division. The battalion never again served overseas and was disbanded in July 1944.

The 7th Battalion served with the 71st Independent Infantry Brigade before being sent to form part of the Gibraltar garrison, with the 2nd Gibraltar Brigade, in June 1942. In March 1943, the battalion was sent to India where it joined 150th Indian Training Brigade but it did not see action against the Japanese. The battalion was disbanded after the war in 1947.

The 8th Battalion joined the Malta garrison in August 1941 and served through the Siege. It was assigned to the 232nd Infantry Brigade and briefly joined the 233rd Infantry Brigade. In November 1943, the battalion was moved to Palestine and then Italy with the 25th Indian Infantry Brigade, part of the 10th Indian Infantry Division. In Italy, on 30 January 1944, the 8th Battalion was disbanded and its personnel merged with the few surviving remnants of the 1st Battalion, King's Own, which had been virtually lost during the fighting at Leros.

The 9th Battalion served in the 47th (Reserve) Infantry Division in the United Kingdom until December 1941. The battalion was transferred to the Royal Artillery and was converted into the 90th Anti-Tank Regiment, Royal Artillery, serving with the 45th Division from February 1942 until November 1943 when it was disbanded.

The 50th (Holding) Battalion was formed in the United Kingdom on 28 May 1940. On 9 October 1940, it was renumbered as the 10th Battalion. 10th Battalion was assigned to 225th Independent Infantry Brigade (Home), formed for service in the United Kingdom. When the brigade was converted into a tank brigade in December 1941, the battalion became the 151st Regiment Royal Armoured Corps. When 107th RAC was disbanded in December 1943, a cadre transferred to 151st RAC, which adopted the number of 107th to perpetuate the 5th Battalion, King's Own, a 1st Line Territorial Army battalion. The new 107th Regiment went on to serve in the North-west Europe from 1944-1945.

=== Post-war ===
After the war, all the units created during the war were disbanded; also, following Indian independence, there was no longer a need to maintain such a large overseas garrison and thus the 2nd Battalion was disbanded in 1948. The regiment received the freedom of Lancaster in 1953, before being amalgamated with the Border Regiment into the King's Own Royal Border Regiment on 31 October 1959. In 1953 and 1954, the 1st Battalion of the regiment was stationed in South Korea following the Korean War.

== Battle honours ==
The regiment's battle honours were as follows:

- Namur 1695, Gibraltar 1704-05, Guadeloupe 1759, St. Lucia 1778, Corunna, Badajoz, Salamanca, Vittoria, San Sebastian, Nive, Peninsula, Bladensburg, Waterloo, Alma, Inkerman, Sevastopol, Abyssinia, South Africa 1879, Relief of Ladysmith, South Africa 1899-1902
- The Great War (16 battalions): Le Cateau, Retreat from Mons, Marne 1914, Aisne 1914, Armentières 1914, Ypres 1915 '17, Gravenstafel, St Julien, Frezenberg, Bellewaarde, Festubert 1915, Loos, Somme 1916 '18, Albert 1916 '18, Bazentin, Delville Wood, Pozières, Guillemont, Ginchy, Flers-Courcelette, Morval, Le Transloy, Ancre Heights, Ancre 1916, Arras 1917 '18, Scarpe 1917 '18, Arleux, Messines 1917, Pilckem, Menin Road, Polygon Wood, Broodseinde, Poelcappelle, Passchendaele, Cambrai 1917 '18, St. Quentin, Lys, Estaires, Hazebrouck, Béthune, Bapaume 1918, Drocourt-Quéant, Hindenburg Line, Canal du Nord, Selle, Valenciennes, Sambre, France and Flanders 1914-18, Struma, Doiran 1917 '18, Macedonia 1915-18, Suvla, Sari Bair, Gallipoli 1915, Egypt 1916, Tigris 1916, Kut al Amara 1917, Baghdad, Mesopotamia 1916-18
- The Second World War: St Omer-La Bassée, Dunkirk 1940, North-West Europe 1940, Defence of Habbaniya, Falluja, Iraq 1941, Merjayun, Jebel Mazar, Syria 1941, Tobruk 1941, Tobruk Sortie, North Africa 1940-42, Montone, Citta di Castello, San Martino Sogliano, Lamone Bridgehead, Italy 1944-45, Malta 1941-42, Chindits 1944, Burma 1944

== Victoria Crosses ==
The following members of the regiment were awarded the Victoria Cross:

- Private (later Sergeant) Thomas Grady, Crimean War
- Private Albert Halton, 1st Battalion, Great War
- Private Harry Christian, 2nd Battalion, Great War
- Lance-Sergeant Tom Fletcher Mayson, 1/4th Battalion, Great War
- Second Lieutenant Joseph Henry Collin, 1/4th Battalion, Great War
- Lance-Corporal (later Corporal) James Hewitson, 1/4th Battalion, Great War
- Lance-Corporal Jack White, 6th (Service) Battalion, Great War
- Private James Miller, 7th (Service) Battalion, Great War
- Corporal Thomas Neely, 8th (Service) Battalion, Great War

== Regimental museum ==
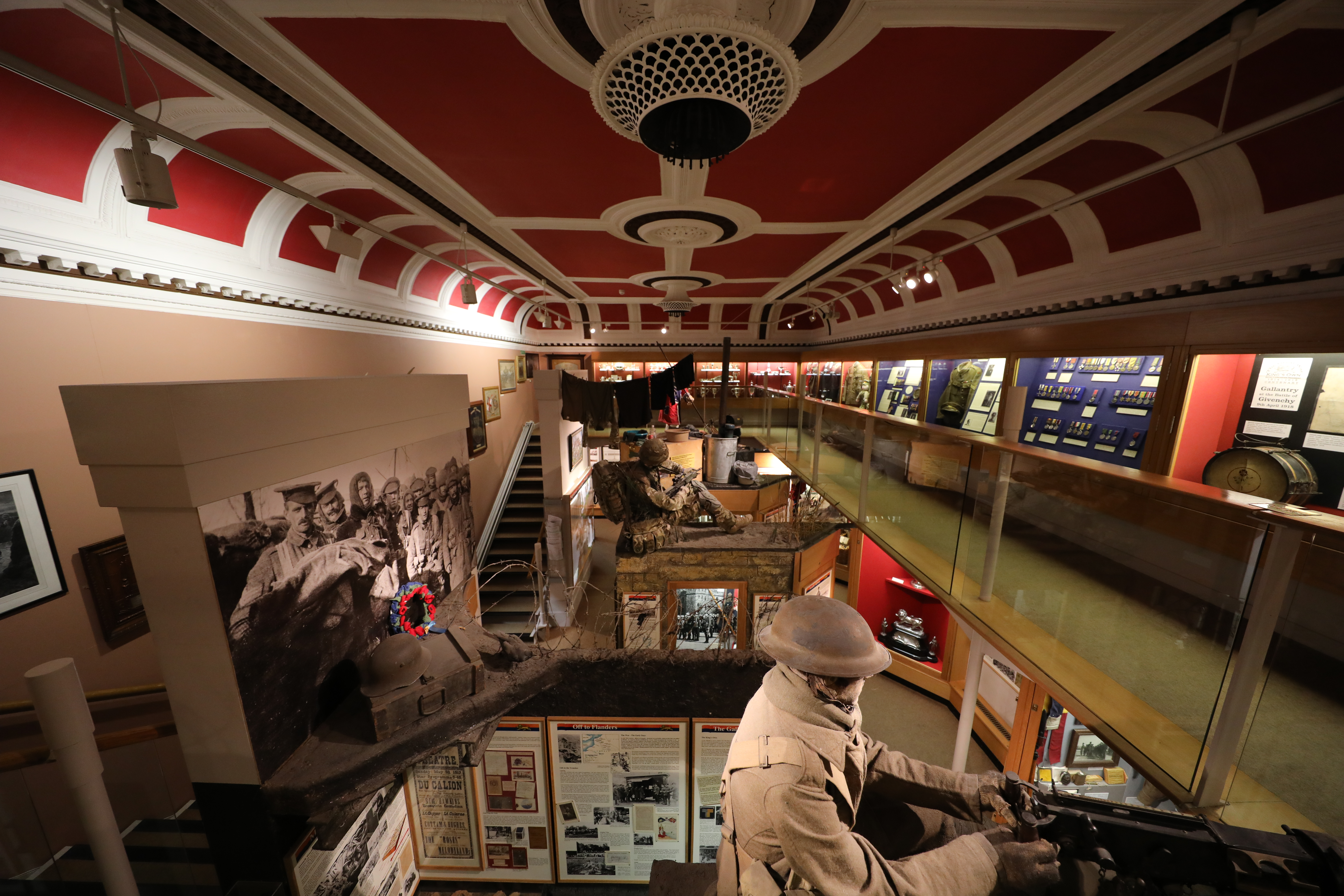
Interior of the regimental museum, 2019

The King's Own Royal Regiment Museum is part of the Lancaster City Museum in Lancaster, Lancashire. The museum, which opened in 1929, exhibits regimental uniforms, medals, regalia, silver, paintings, medals, weapons and other memorabilia reflecting the regiment's history.

== Colonels-in-Chief ==
The colonels-in-chief were as follows:

- 1903 F.M. King Edward VII
- 1913 F.M. King George V

== Colonels ==
The colonels of the regiment were as follows:

- 1680 Col. Charles FitzCharles, 1st Earl of Plymouth (bastard son of Charles II, d. 1680)
- 1680 Lt-Gen. Hon Percy Kirke (senior)
- 1682 Col. Charles Trelawny

The Queen Consort's Regiment of Foot - (1688)

- 1688 Col. Sir Charles Orby, 2nd Bt.
- 1688 Maj-Gen. Charles Trelawny [reappointed]
- 1692 Brig-Gen. Henry Trelawny
- 1702 Lt-Gen. William Seymour

The King's Own Regiment of Foot - (1715)

- 1717 Brig-Gen. The Hon. Henry Berkeley
- 1719 Gen. Charles Cadogan, 2nd Baron Cadogan
- 1734 Lt-Gen. William Barrell
- 1749 Lt-Gen. Sir Robert Rich, 5th Baronet

4th (The King's Own) Regiment of Foot - (1751)

- 1756 Lt-Gen. Alexander Duroure
- 1765 Col. The Hon. Robert Brudenell

4th (The King's Own Royal) Regiment of Foot - (1767)

- 1768 F.M. Studholme Hodgson
- 1782 Lt-Gen. Sir John Burgoyne
- 1792 Gen. George Morrison
- 1799 Gen. John Pitt, 2nd Earl of Chatham, KG
- 1835 Gen. John Hodgson
- 1846 Gen. Sir Thomas Bradford, GCB, GCH
- 1853 Gen. Sir John Bell, GCB
- 1876 Gen. Studholme John Hodson

The King's Own (Royal Lancaster Regiment) - (1881)

- 1890 Gen. William Sankey, CB
- 1892 Lt-Gen. William Wilby, CB
- 1894 Gen. Sir William Gordon Cameron, GCB, VD
- 1913 Gen. Sir Archibald Hunter, GCB, GCVO, DSO, LLD, TD

The King's Own Royal Regiment (Lancaster) - (1921)

- 1926 Lt-Gen. Sir Oswald Cuthbert Borrett, KCB, CMG, CBE, DSO
- 1945 Maj-Gen. Russell Mortimer Luckock, CB, CMG, DSO
- 1947 Brig. John Herbert Hardy, CBE, MC
- 1957 Maj-Gen. Richard Neville Anderson, CB, CBE, DSO (continued 1961 in King's Own Royal Border Regiment; also 10th Gurkha Rifles)

== Bibliography ==
- Beckett, Ian (2003). Discovering English County Regiments. Shire. ISBN 978-0747-805069.
- Cannon, Richard (1839). Historical record of The Fourth, or, The King's Own Regiment of Foot. Longman, Orme & Company and William Clowes & Sons. ISBN 9780665483868.
- Forty, George (1998). British Army Handbook 1939–1945. Stroud, Gloucestershire: Sutton Publishing Limited. ISBN 0-7509-1403-3.
- J.B.M. Frederick, Lineage Book of British Land Forces 1660-1978, Volume I, 1984: Microform Academic Publishers, Wakefield, United Kingdom. ISBN 1-85117-007-3.
- Col George Jackson Hay, An Epitomized History of the Militia (The Constitutional Force), London:United Service Gazette, 1905/Ray Westlake Military Books, 1987 ISBN 0-9508530-7-0.
- Joslen, H. F. (2003) [1960]. Orders of Battle: Second World War, 1939–1945. Uckfield, East Sussex: Naval and Military Press. ISBN 978-1-84342-474-1.
