= James Kempt =

British Army general (c. 1765–1854)

General The Right Honourable Sir James Kempt GCB GCH
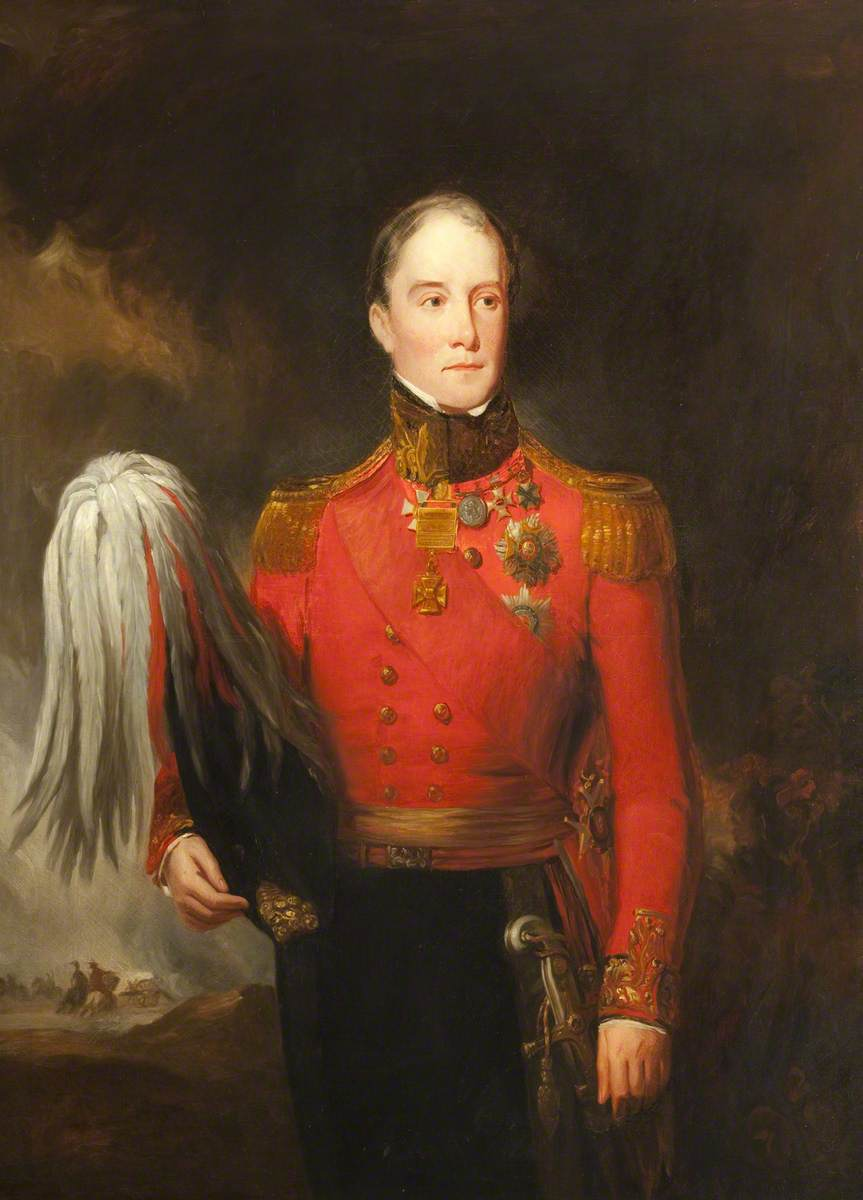
- Portrait by Robert McInnes, 1840
- Born: c. 1765; Edinburgh, Scotland
- Died: 20 December 1854; London, England
- Military career
- Allegiance: United Kingdom
- Branch: British Army
- Rank: General
- Commands: South-West District; 8th Brigade
- Conflicts: War of the Third Coalition; Peninsular War; War of 1812; War of the Seventh Coalition
- Awards: Knight Grand Cross of the Order of the Bath; Knight Grand Cross of the Royal Guelphic Order

General Sir James Kempt, GCB, GCH (c. 25 January 1775 – 20 December 1854) was a British Army officer, who served in the Netherlands, Egypt, Italy, the Peninsula, and British North America during the Napoleonic Wars. He led a British brigade at the Battle of Waterloo and later became Governor General of Canada.

== Early career ==
Born in Edinburgh around 1765, he was the son of Gavin Kempt of Batley Hall, Hampshire.

Kempt was gazetted to the 101st Grenadiers in India in 1783, but on its disbandment two years later was placed on half-pay. It is said that he took a clerkship in Greenwoods, the army agents (afterwards Cox & Co.). He attracted the notice of the Duke of York, through whom he obtained a captaincy (very soon followed by a majority) in the newly raised 113th Foot. But it was not long before his regiment experienced the fate of the old 101st; this time however Kempt was retained on full pay in the recruiting service.

In 1799 Kempt accompanied Sir Ralph Abercromby to the Netherlands, and later to Egypt as an aide-de-camp. After Abercromby's death, Kempt remained on his successor's staff until the end of the campaign in Egypt. In April 1803 he joined the staff of Sir David Dundas, but next month returned to regimental duty, and a little later received a lieutenant colonelcy in the 81st Foot. With his new regiment he went, under Craig, to the Mediterranean theatre of operations, and at the Battle of Maida on 4 July 1806, he led the light infantry brigade which bore the heaviest share of the battle.

== Peninsular War ==
Employed from 1807 to 1811 on the staff in North America, Brevet-Colonel Kempt at the end of 1811 joined Arthur Wellesley, Marquess of Wellington's army in Spain with the local rank of major general, which was, on 1 January 1812, made substantive. As one of Thomas Picton's brigadiers, Kempt took part in the great assault on Badajoz and was severely wounded. On rejoining for duty, he was posted to the command of a brigade of the Light Division (43rd Regiment of Foot, 95th Rifles, and 3rd Portuguese Light Infantry) in time to fight at the Battle of Vitoria on 21 June 1813. He also led his brigade at the Battle of the Pyrenees at the end of July, and at the Battle of the Bidassoa, where his troops stormed French defenses near Mont La Rhune on 7 October. While still commanding his brigade at the Battle of Nivelle on 10 November, he was again wounded. In 1814, he led his brigade at the battles of Orthez and Toulouse.

== Canada and Waterloo ==
After the first abdication of Napoleon Bonaparte, Kempt was transferred once again to North America, where the Anglo-American War of 1812 was still being fought. He commanded a brigade which was intended to attack the vital American post of Sackets Harbor, New York, but logistical problems prevented the attack being made before winter brought an end to campaigning in Canada. News of peace between Britain and America reached Canada early in 1815, and Kempt returned to Europe.

Kempt was appointed to lead the 8th British Brigade in the army Wellington assembled in Belgium to invade France. The 8th Brigade consisted of the 1/28th, 1/32nd, 2/79th Highland and 1/95th Rifles in Sir Thomas Picton's 5th Division. At the Battle of Quatre Bras, Kempt's brigade was involved in heavy fighting and suffered 638 killed and wounded. At the Battle of Waterloo on 18 June, his brigade was again in the thick of combat and lost 681 killed and wounded. On Picton's death, Kempt succeeded to the command of the division. Early in 1815 he was made a Knight Commander of the Order of the Bath, and in July for his services at Waterloo, a Knight Grand Cross of the Order of the Bath.

The Dutch King made him a Knight in the Military Order of William. He became Lieutenant-Governor of Portsmouth and General Officer Commanding South-West District in August 1819.

From 1828 to 1830 he was Governor of British North America, and at a critical time displayed firmness and moderation. He was afterwards Master-General of the Ordnance. At the time of his death at his home in South Audley Street, London in 1854 he had for some years been a full general and left a personal fortune of some £120,000.

=== Honorific eponyms ===
Geographic locations

- Nova Scotia: Kemptville, Kempt Shore, Kempt, Kempt Road, Halifax; Kempt Street, Lunenburg
- Ontario: Kemptville
- Kempt Tower, Jersey

== Sources ==
- Burroughs, Peter (1985). "Kempt, Sir James". In Halpenny, Francess G. (ed.). Dictionary of Canadian Biography. Vol. VIII (1851–1860) (online ed.). University of Toronto Press.
- Glover, Michael. The Peninsular War 1807–1814. London: Penguin, 2001. ISBN 0-14-139041-7
- Smith, Digby. The Napoleonic Wars Data Book. London: Greenhill, 1998. ISBN 1-85367-276-9

Military offices
Preceded by Lord Howard	GOC South-West District; August 1819 – October 1819	Succeeded by Sir George Cooke
New regiment	Colonel of the 8th Battalion, 60th Regiment of Foot; 1813–1816	Battalion disbanded
Preceded by Sir John Murray	Colonel of the 3rd West India Regiment; 1818–1819	Disbanded
Preceded by Sir Henry Johnson	Colonel of the 81st Regiment of Foot; 1819–1829	Succeeded by Sir Richard Downes Jackson
Preceded by Sir Brent Spencer	Colonel of the 40th Regiment of Foot; 1829–1834	Succeeded by Sir George Cooke
Preceded by The Viscount Beresford	Master-General of the Ordnance; 1830–1834	Succeeded by Sir George Murray
Preceded by Sir William Keppel	Colonel of the 2nd (The Queen's Royal) Regiment of Foot; 1834–1846	Succeeded by The Lord Saltoun
Preceded by Sir George Murray	Colonel of the 1st, or The Royal Regiment of Foot; 1846–1854	Succeeded by Sir Edward Blakeney
Political offices
Preceded by The Earl of Dalhousie	Lieutenant Governor of Nova Scotia; 1820–1828	Succeeded by Thomas N. Jeffrey (acting)
Preceded by The Earl of Dalhousie	Governor General of British North America; 1828–1830	Succeeded by The Lord Aylmer
