= Maurice Charles O'Connell =

Civil servant in Australia

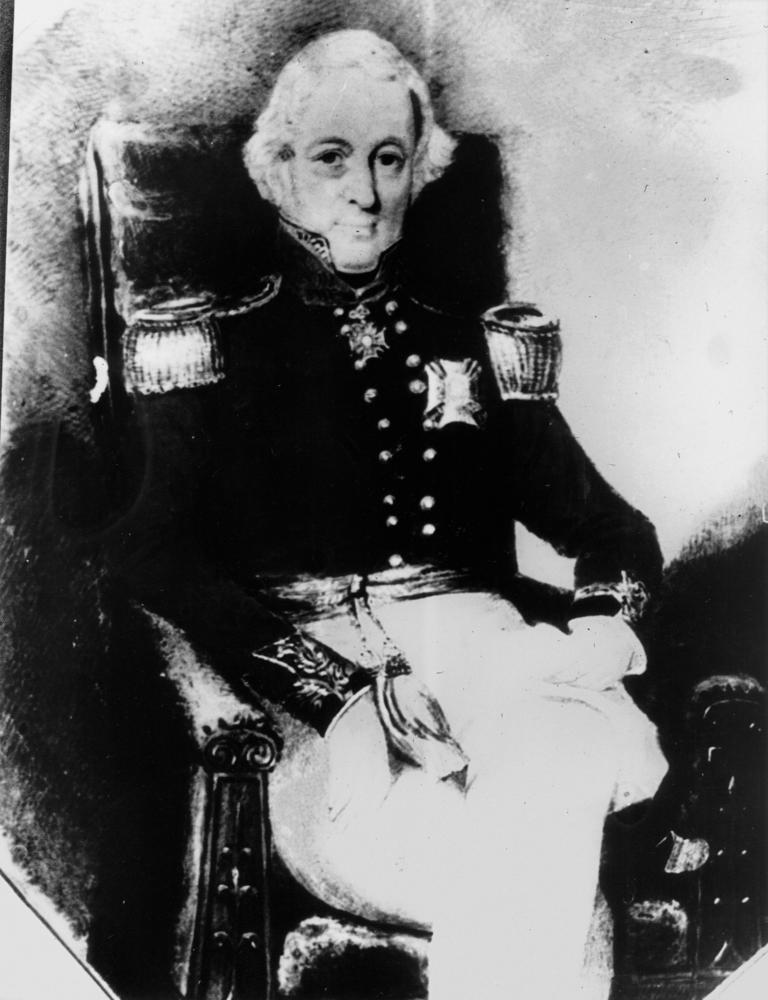
Sir Maurice Charles Philip O'Connell

Sir Maurice Charles Philip O'Connell KCH (1768 – 25 May 1848) was a commander of forces and lieutenant-governor of colonial New South Wales.

== Early life ==
Maurice Charles O'Connell was born in Ireland in 1768. He had had a distinguished career in the army. His family the Tarmon branch of the O’Connell clan of Kerry, Munster were cousins to the Derrynane O’Connell family, such as Daniel O’Connell MP.

== New South Wales ==
In 1809, he came with the newly appointed Governor of New South Wales Macquarie to Sydney in charge of the 73rd Regiment of Foot. There, in May 1810, O'Connell hastily married widow Mary Putland, the daughter of the deposed former governor William Bligh, shortly before Bligh's return to England.

== Later life ==
Maurice O'Connell died in Sydney on 25 May 1848, and received a full military funeral at St James' Church.

== Legacy ==
O'Connell, New South Wales was named after him by George Evans, when Evans followed the route of Blaxland, Lawson, and Wentworth in crossing the Blue Mountains as were streets in Sydney, Melbourne and North Adelaide.

His son, Sir Maurice Charles O'Connell, was also a member of the Legislative Council (1845–1849) and then a member of the Queensland Legislative Council (1860–1879).

Government offices
Preceded by Joseph Foveaux	Lieutenant Governor of New South Wales; 1810–1814	Succeeded by George Molle
Military offices
Preceded by Sir John Waters	Colonel of the 81st Regiment of Foot (Loyal Lincoln Volunteers); 1842–1844	Succeeded by Sir George Henry Frederick Berkeley
