= Henry Renny =

British Army general

General Henry Renny CSI

24th General Officer Commanding, Ceylon
- In office 1869–1874
- Preceded by: Studholme John Hodson
- Succeeded by: John Alfred Street

Personal details
- Born: 2 September 1815
- Died: 4 April 1900 (aged 84) South Kensington
- Spouse: Eleanor Anne Hepburn
- Children: 3 children

Military service
- Allegiance: United Kingdom
- Branch/service: British Army
- Rank: General
- Commands: General Officer Commanding, Ceylon

General Henry Renny CSI (9 September 1815 – 4 April 1900) was a British Army officer who was the 24th General Officer Commanding, Ceylon.

He was appointed General Officer Commanding, Ceylon in 1869 and succeeded by John Alfred Street in 1874.

== Career ==
Born 9 September 1815, Henry Renny was the second surviving son of Alexander Renny-Tailyour of Borrowfield and Elizabeth Bannerman Ramsay. He entered the army as Ensign in 1833. He was promoted to Lieutenant in 1835, Captain in 1844, Lieutenant-Colonel in 1853, Colonel in 1854, Major-General in 1867, Lieutenant-General in 1874, and General in 1877.

He commanded the 81st Regiment throughout Indian Rebellion of 1857. For this service and others performed by the 81st Regiment, he was made a Companion of the Star of India (C.S.I.), and received the 1857 Medal. He commanded the 1st Brigade in the Sittana Expedition of May 1858, under Sir Sydney Cotton, obtaining medal with clasp.

In 1875, he was given the colonelcy of the 35th (Royal Sussex) Regiment of Foot, transferring in 1879 back to the 81st Regiment of Foot (Loyal Lincoln Volunteers) until their amalgamation with the 47th (Lancashire) Regiment of Foot to form The Loyal North Lancashire Regiment in 1881. He was then colonel of the 2nd Battalion of the Loyal North Lancs until his death. He was made full general on 1 October 1877.

General Renny died at his residence in South Kensington on 4 April 1900.

He married Eleanor Anne Hepburn, third daughter of Robert Rickart Hepburn of Rickarton and had two sons and a daughter.

Military offices
Preceded by Studholme John Hodson	General Officer Commanding, Ceylon; 1869–1874	Succeeded by John Alfred Street
Preceded by New Regiment	Colonel of the 2nd Battalion, The Loyal North Lancashire Regiment; 1881–?1900	Succeeded by Hugh Thomas Jones-Vaughan
Preceded by William Frederick Forster	Colonel of the 81st Regiment of Foot (Loyal Lincoln Volunteers); 1879–1881	Succeeded by amalgamation to form The Loyal North Lancashire Regiment
