= George Berkeley (British Army officer) =

General Sir George Berkeley KCB
- Born: 9 July 1785
- Died: 25 September 1857 (aged 72)
- Military career
- Allegiance: United Kingdom
- Branch: British Army
- Rank: General
- Commands: Madras Army
- Conflicts: Waterloo Campaign; Crimean War
- Awards: Knight Commander of the Order of the Bath

General Sir George Henry Frederick Berkeley KCB (9 July 1785 – 25 September 1857) was a British Army officer and Conservative politician.

== Military career ==
Berkeley was the eldest son of Admiral Sir George Cranfield Berkeley, third son of Augustus Berkeley, 4th Earl of Berkeley. His mother was Emilia Charlotte, daughter of Lord George Lennox.

At the start of the Waterloo Campaign of 1815, he was the Duke of Wellington's liaison officer at the Prince of Orange's headquarters. He was also created KCB in 1815. He became Commander-in-Chief of the Madras Army in 1848 and Surveyor-General of the Ordnance in 1852.

He was given the colonelcy of the 81st Regiment of Foot in 1844, transferring in 1845 to the 35th Regiment of Foot, a position he held until his death. He was promoted full general on 20 June 1854.

== Political career ==
Berkeley was returned to Parliament for Devonport in 1852, a seat he held until 1857.

== Family ==
Berkeley died in September 1857, aged 72.

He had married Lucy, daughter of Sir Thomas Sutton, 1st Baronet, in 1815. They had three sons and one daughter. His third son, George, succeeded as 7th Earl of Berkeley in 1882. Lady Berkeley died in February 1870.

He was the paternal grandfather of Randal Thomas Mowbray Berkeley, 8th Earl of Berkeley.

== Notes ==
Military offices
Preceded by The Marquess of Tweeddale	C-in-C, Madras Army; 1848–1851	Succeeded by Sir Richard Armstrong
Preceded by Charles Richard Fox	Surveyor-General of the Ordnance; 1852–1853	Succeeded by Lauderdale Maule
Preceded by Sir Richard Downes Jackson	Colonel of the 35th (Royal Sussex) Regiment of Foot; 1845–1857	Succeeded by Sir John Leslie
Preceded by Sir Maurice Charles O'Connell	Colonel of the 81st Regiment of Foot (Loyal Lincoln Volunteers); 1844–1845	Succeeded by Sir Neil Douglas
Parliament of the United Kingdom
Preceded by Henry Tufnell; Sir John Romilly	Member of Parliament for Devonport; 1852–1857; With: Henry Tufnell 1852–1854; Sir Thomas Erskine Perry 1854–1857	Succeeded by Sir Thomas Erskine Perry; James Wilson
