= Richard Downes Jackson =

Canadian politician

Lieutenant-General Sir Richard Downes Jackson KCB
- Born: 1777; Petersfield, Hampshire
- Died: 9 June 1845 (aged 67–68)
- Burial place: Sorel-Tracy, Quebec
- Military career
- Allegiance: United Kingdom
- Branch: British Army
- Service years: 1794–1845
- Rank: Lieutenant-General
- Units: Coldstream Guards
- Commands: Northern District; North America
- Conflicts: French Revolutionary Wars; Irish Rebellion of 1798; Napoleonic Wars; Hanover Expedition; Copenhagen Expedition; Peninsular War; Siege of Cádiz; Battle of Barrosa; Battle of Fuentes d'Onoro; Battle of Salamanca; Battle of Nivelle; Battle of the Nive; Passage of the Adour; Battle of Garris; Battle of Orthes; Battle of Aire; Battle of Toulouse
- Awards: Army Gold Medal

Lieutenant-General Sir Richard Downes Jackson KCB (1777 – 9 June 1845), born at Petersfield in the English county of Hampshire, was an officer in the British Army and subsequently colonial Administrator. Following service during the Napoleonic Wars, he was appointed the Commander-in-Chief of the British Army in British North America. During that time, he also served for a few months as the Administrator of the government of the Province of Canada. He died in Canada in 1845 and is buried there.

== Military career ==
Jackson was commissioned as an ensign in the Coldstream Guards on 9 July 1794. After seeing action during the Irish Rebellion of 1798 he took part in the Battle of Copenhagen during the Napoleonic Wars. He fought at the Siege of Cádiz and the Battle of Barrosa during the Peninsular War and was knighted on 12 April 1815.

After the conclusion of the Napoleonic Wars, Jackson was appointed deputy quartermaster general in 1820, General Officer Commanding Northern District in 1836 and Commander-in-Chief, North America in 1839, a post which he held until his death in 1845.

== Administrator of Province of Canada ==
In September 1841, Lord Sydenham, the Governor General of the Province of Canada, died in office. Jackson was appointed the Administrator of the Province. He exercised the powers of the Governor General until the arrival of Sydenham's successor, Sir Charles Bagot in early 1842.

== Death ==
Jackson continued as Commander-in-Chief until 1845 when, missing his family in England, he asked to be recalled. Instead, he died suddenly in the summer of 1845, shortly before the arrival of his successor, Lord Cathcart. He was buried near his country home at William-Henry, Canada East (now Sorel, Quebec).

Military offices
Preceded by Sir Henry Bouverie	GOC Northern District; 1836–1839	Succeeded by Sir Charles Napier
Preceded by Sir John Colborne	Commander-in-Chief, North America; 1839–1845	Succeeded by Earl Cathcart
Preceded by Sir John Oswald	Colonel of the 35th (Royal Sussex) Regiment of Foot; 1840–1845	Succeeded by Sir George Henry Frederick Berkeley
Preceded by James Kempt	Colonel of the 81st Regiment of Foot; 1829–1840	Succeeded by John Waters
