= 81st Regiment of Foot (Loyal Lincoln Volunteers) =

Former infantry regiment of the British Army

81st (Loyal Lincoln Volunteers) Regiment of Foot
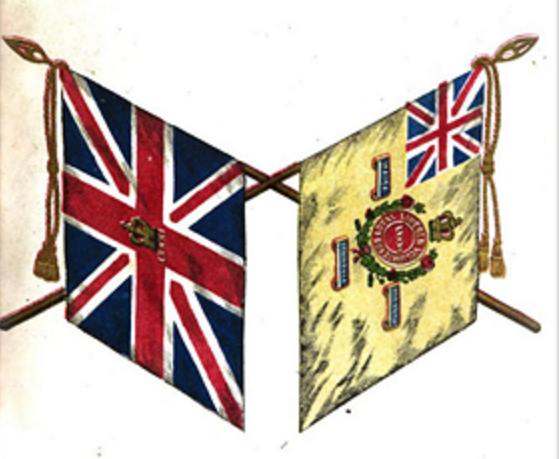
- Colours of the 81st (Loyal Lincoln Volunteers) Regiment of Foot
- Active: 1793–1881
- Country: Kingdom of Great Britain (1793–1800); United Kingdom (1801–1881)
- Branch: British Army
- Type: Infantry Regiment
- Role: Infantry
- Garrison/HQ: Fulwood Barracks, Lancashire
- Motto: Loyaute m'oblige
- March: "The Red, Red Rose" and "The Lincolnshire Poacher"
- Engagements: French Revolutionary Wars; Napoleonic Wars; Second Anglo-Afghan War

The 81st Regiment of Foot (Loyal Lincoln Volunteers) was an infantry regiment of the British Army, raised in 1793. Under the Childers Reforms it amalgamated with the 47th (Lancashire) Regiment of Foot to form the Loyal North Lancashire Regiment in 1881.

== History ==
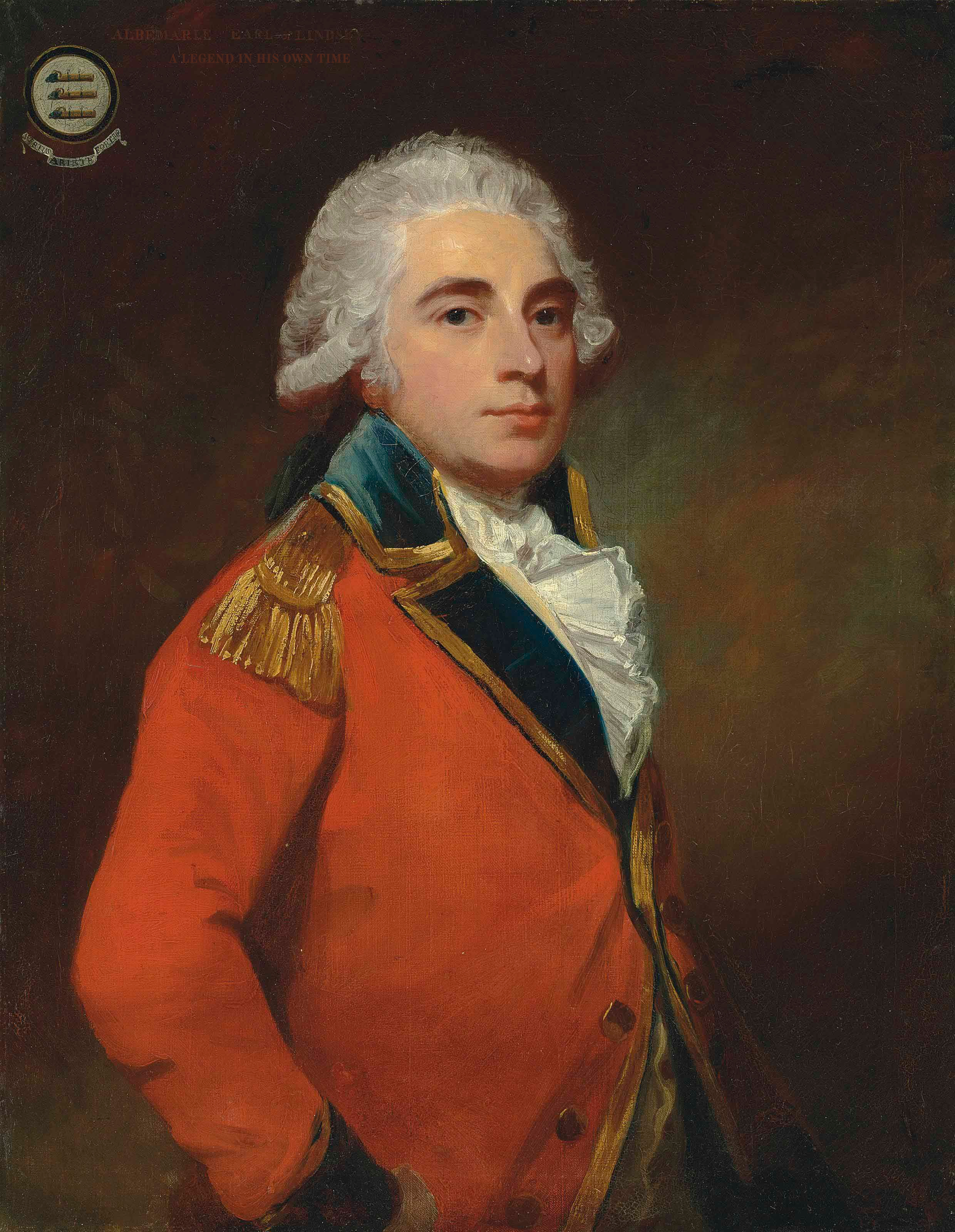
Major-General Albemarle Bertie by George Romney

=== Raising of the Regiment ===
The regiment was raised by Major General Albemarle Bertie as the Loyal Lincoln Volunteers, in response to the threat posed by the French Revolution, on 23 September 1793. However, no levy money would be provided. The original complement was composed of the Militia of Lincoln volunteering to serve in the new regiment: the regiment was embodied in January 1794. On 25 January 1794, the Loyal Lincoln Volunteers were redesignated as the 81st Regiment of Foot. The regiment was quartered in Lincoln and Gainsborough. The first commander was Lieutenant Colonel Lewis.

=== Napoleonic Wars ===
==== 1795 – 1797: West Indies ====
After a year's service in Ireland, the regiment was detailed to serve under Major-General Ralph Abercromby in the West Indies. The regiment sailed from Southampton and arrived in the West Indies in March 1794. The regiment was sent to reinforce British operations on Saint-Domingue in what is now Haiti. As was common during the era, the European troops of the regiment suffered heavily from tropical diseases, in particular yellow fever. By November 1795, less than a year after, the regiment's losses to illness were so heavy that it was temporarily amalgamated with another battalion, of the 32nd Regiment, to produce a unit that would be combat effective. Despite the capture of the French defences at Bompard, the British Expedition to St. Dominque was a failure. In April 1797, the regiment was ordered to return to the England.

==== 1797 – 1802: Guernsey and South Africa ====
After returning home from the West Indies, the regiment spent much of the year recruiting and refitting. The regiment was made part of the garrison for Guernsey beginning in October 1797. During this time, the rank and file took up a subscription to help support the war effort, each non-commissioned officer and enlisted man contributing between two and seven days pay to the war effort.

In 1798, the regiment was dispatched to help put down an uprising in the Cape Colony. Arriving in the new year, the regiment was quartered at Cape Town. Although sent to put down an insurrection, most of the regiment's fighting was against Rarabe tribesmen under their chief Gaika. On 5 May 1799 a party of the regiment's grenadier company was ambushed by Rarabe tribesman. All but the detachment's drummer were killed in the fighting. Emboldened by their success, Gaika's force attacked the regiment at its encampment on the Sunday River. The Rarebe were repulsed with heavy casualties by the regiment.

This was the regiment's last major action during its stay in the Cape Colony. For the next four years, the regiment continued to garrison the colony until the Treaty of Amiens in 1802. With the signing of the treaty, the men of the regiment were offered the chance to volunteer to serve in India in different regiments, for a sizable bounty, or to return to England with their regiment. More than six hundred of the regiment volunteered for Indian service, many being sent as replacements with the 22nd Regiment of Foot.

==== 1803 – 1807: Ireland, Sicily, and Maida ====
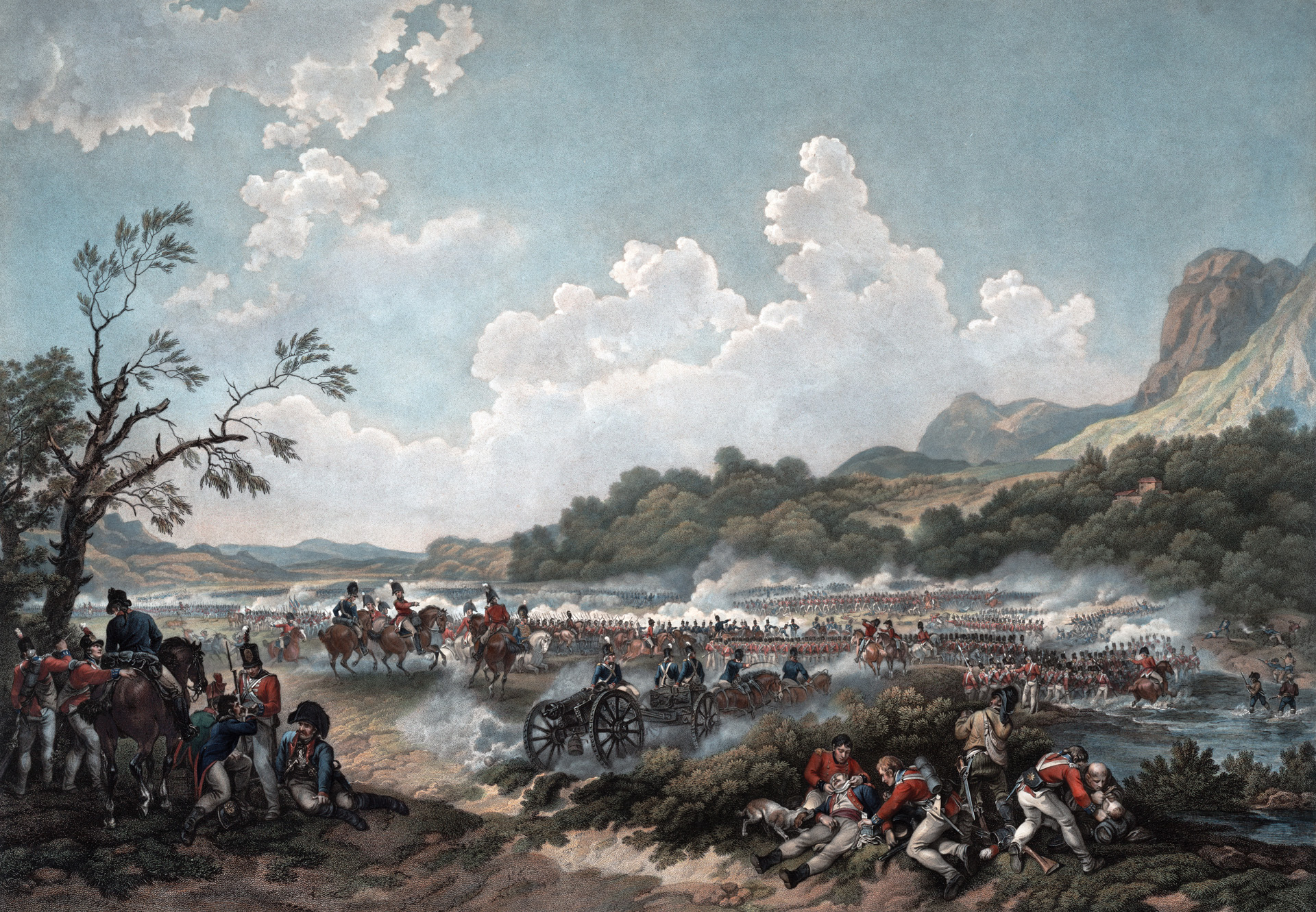
The Battle of Maida July 1806

After South Africa, the regiment returned to England as the Amiens peace was ending. Once back in England, the regiment began recruiting and eventually had enough men to bring the battalion up to full strength as well as for a reserve battalion. The 2nd battalion of the regiment was formally embodied on 15 October 1803 at Mills Bay Barracks in Plymouth under the command of Lieutenant Colonel Knight. Under the initial plan, the 1st battalion would be for universal service while the 2nd battalion would be kept for home service in the British Isles. As such, in 1804, the 2nd battalion was stationed in Ireland, initially at Kinsale, but later moved to Cork. In 1805, the 1st battalion was assigned to Lieutenant General Sir James Craig's expeditionary group. The 1st battalion participated in the invasion of Naples, but then retreated to Sicily once word of the Napoleon's victory at Ulm was received.

Still in Sicily in 1806, the 1st battalion was part of Major General John Stuart's force that attacked the French in Calabria. On 4 July 1806, Stuart's force engaged the French at the Battle of Maida. After stopping the initial French advance with musket fire, Stuart ordered forward Colonel Acland's brigade (including the 1st battalion). At bayonet point, the 1st battalion, together with 78th Regiment of Foot, drove off the French Forty-second regiment, as well as two battalions of Polish infantry before pausing to fire into the now exposed flanks of the French forces. Among the spoils of the battle was a silver tortoise snuff box, taken as a trophy by the 1st battalion and kept as a regimental trophy of the battle. For its actions, the regiment was granted the battle honour Maida and voted the thanks of Parliament. Despite its victory at Maida, the 1st battalion soon withdrew to Sicily after Stuart's campaign failed to produce a general uprising against the French. The 1st battalion remained on Sicily, participating in the unsuccessful relief of Colonel Hudson Lowe's forces at Capri, as well operations to prevent the French from taking Sicily until withdrawn in 1812.

==== 1808 – 1809: Spain and Walchren ====
In September 1808, the 2nd battalion was transferred to join Lieutenant General Sir John Moore's command. Along with the rest of the 15,000 men, the 2nd battalion was destined for Corunna where it took part in Moore's campaign in northern Spain during the winter of 1808 to assist the Spanish Armies against Imperial France. It retreated with the rest of Moore's forces to Corunna. On 16 January 1809, as part of Lieutenant-General David Baird's division guarding the right flank of the British forces, the 2nd battalion fought in some of the heaviest fighting of the battle. The 2nd battalion advanced in support of the 42nd Regiment of Foot and the 50th Regiment of Foot. Despite being driven back from their initial gains, the 2nd battalion counter-attacked with the 42nd and 50th regiments and then held their position until relieved. With the surviving units of Moore's army, the 2nd battalion was withdrawn by sea to England the next day. For their part in the battle, the regiment was granted the battle honour "Corunna".

After refitting in England, the 2nd battalion was assigned to Lord Chatham's command for the Walcheren Campaign. During the siege of Flushing, the principal action which the 2nd battalion participated, the battalion casualties were 3 killed and 5 wounded. Over the next five months, malaria and other diseases cost the battalion 298, nearly a third of its authorized strength. Along with the rest of Chatham's command, the 2nd battalion was withdrawn in December 1809.

==== 1812 – 1813: Spain and The Netherlands ====
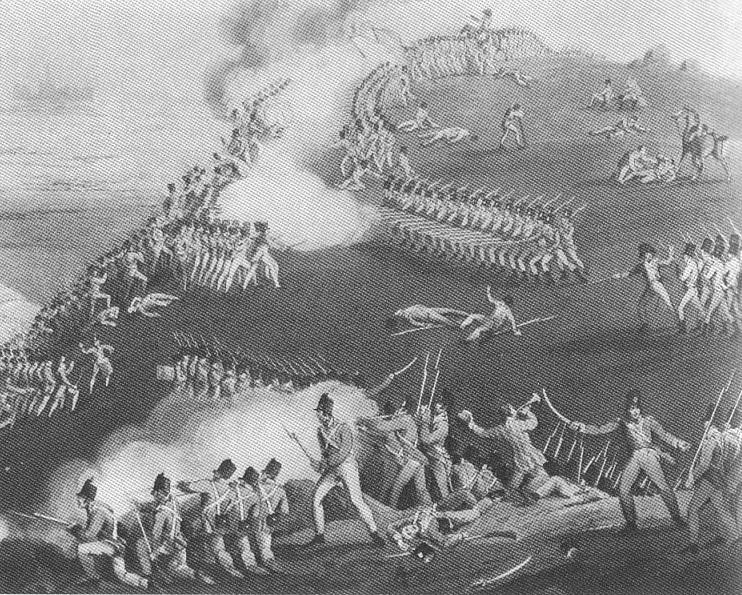
The Battle of Castalla April 1813

After spending almost six years defending Sicily, the 1st battalion was withdrawn and assigned to Lieutenant-General Frederick Maitland's expedition to Catalonia. Maitaland's expedition was a feint to help with the main Allied thrust in 1812. After an aborted initial landing, the 1st battalion landed in Spain in August 1812. Throughout the rest of the year, the campaigned continued on inconclusively in the region of Alicante.

Eventually, after Maitland relinquished command due to illness, General Sir John Murray assumed command of the expedition in 1813. With him came an addition 12,000 men, the Anglo-Sicilian force contained approximately 16,000 men. They were opposed by Marshal Louis-Gabriel Suchet. Advancing, Murray's command, and the 1st battalion, encountered and defeated Suchet's forces at the Battle of Castalla on 13 April 1813. A month later, after besieging the city of Tarragona, the 1st battalion retreated offshore with the rest of Anglo-Spanish-Sicilian force when General Murray was fooled into believing that advancing French columns were significantly larger than they actually were. After Murray's relief and replacement by Lieutenant General Lord William Bentinck, the 1st battalion returned with the rest of the force to the region around Alicante. With the Duke of Wellington's victory at Vittoria, Succhet began a withdrawal from Valencia and Catalan. Bentick's force began its slow, ineffective pursuit.

==== 1814: Holland and North America ====
After spending the previous four years in England and Jersey supplying the 1st battalion with drafts of men and officers, the 2nd battalion were dispatched as reinforcements to General Sir Thomas Graham's expedition to the Low Countries. Arriving in February 1814, they were assigned to the 2nd Division's 2nd Brigade. The 2nd battalion did not participate in the ill-fated assault on Bergen op Zoom on 8 March 1814. With Napoleon's abdication after signing the Treaty of Fontainebleau, the 2nd battalion remained in the Netherlands, stationed at Brussels, rather than being despatched to North America to fight against the United States.

Meanwhile, the 1st battalion, along with the rest of its brigade was transferred, upon Napoleon's abdication, from Spain to North America. Arriving in August 1814, the 1st battalion landed in Quebec and was ordered to move south. However, the 1st battalion missed the major engagements of the 1814 campaign. With the news of peace in March 1815, the 1st battalion remained in garrison until later in 1815 when word of Napoleon's escape from Elba spread.

==== 1815: The Hundred Days ====
The 1st battalion embarked for Europe on 15 June 1815: it missed the final campaign against Napoleon but served in the occupation army in France until April 1817 at which time it was posted to Ireland.

The 2nd battalion had been held in reserve in Brussels since Napoleon's abdication. However, upon learning that Napoleon had left Elba, the battalion was put back on war footing. The 2nd battalion was assigned to the 10th Brigade under Major-General John Lambert, part of Lieutenant General Lowry Cole's 6th Division. With the rest of the division, the 2nd battalion missed the Battle of Quatre Bras on 16 June 1815. The 2nd battalion was still in the process of concentrating at the time of the battle. Even after the rest of the brigade was ready and on the road, the 2nd battalion was still left behind to guard the hospitals and treasury in Brussels. Just as its sister battalion missed the campaign, the 2nd battalion were held out of the fighting during the Hundred Days. The next year, the 2nd battalion were disbanded.

=== The Victorian era ===
==== 1817 – 1853: Garrison Duty in Canada, Gibraltar, The West Indies, England and Ireland ====
The regiment garrisoned Ireland until being transferred to Canada in 1822. After seven years in Canada, the regiment were sent to the West Indies, spending two years in Bermuda before being returned to England in 1831. After rotating through stations in England and Ireland, the regiment was on the move again, being stationed at Gibraltar in 1836, reinforcing the garrison there when tensions started to escalate during the First Carlist War. After nine years on the Rock, the regiment was once again sent back to the West Indies. Three years in the West Indies' outposts of Barbados, Trinidad and Tobago, and St. Kitts were followed by years in Canada. The regiment would be returned home to England in 1847. After serving in various stations in England and Ireland, the regiment was sent on foreign service again, this time to India in 1853.

==== 1853 – 1863: India, Sepoy Mutiny, and the North-West Frontier ====
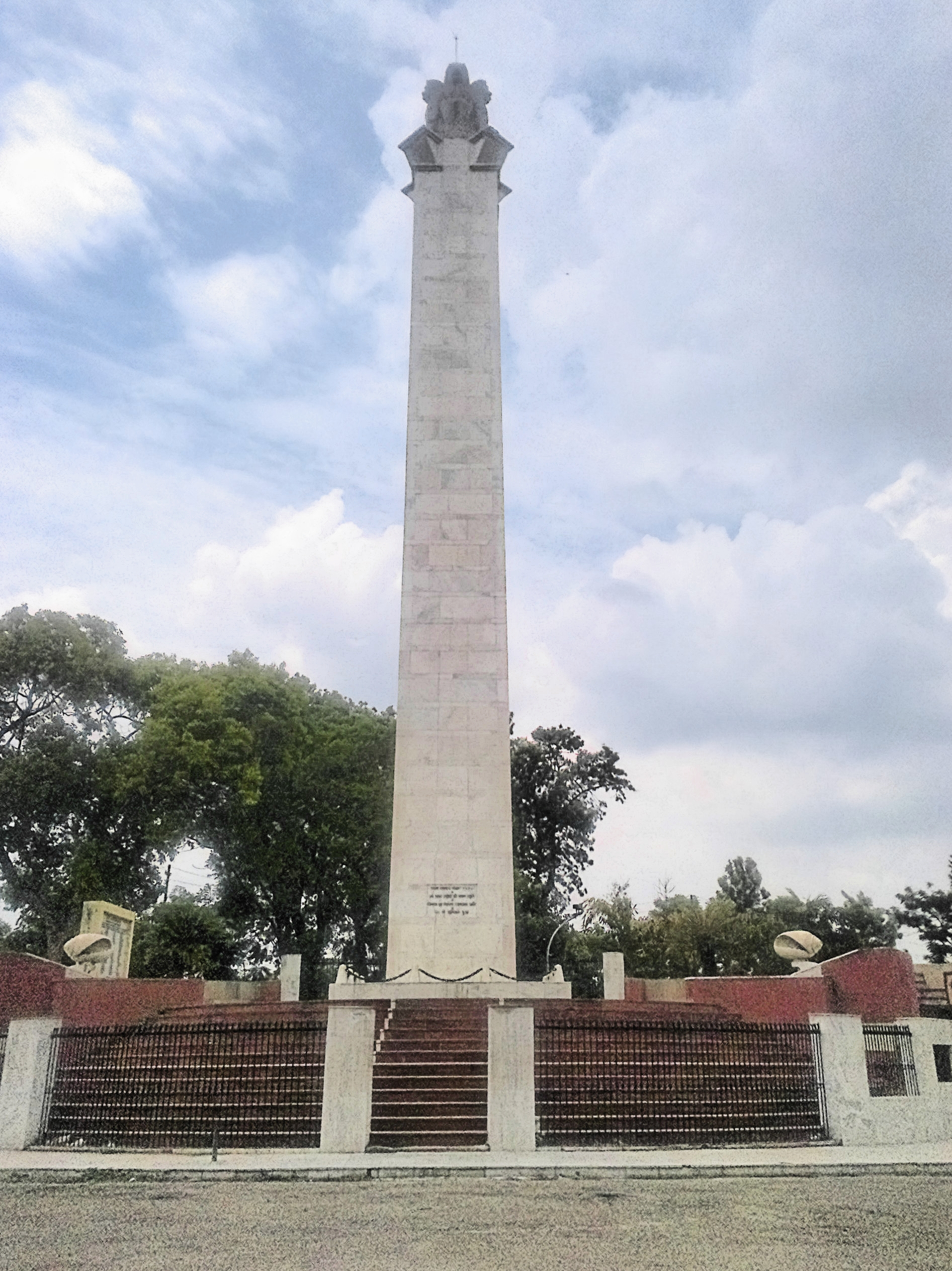
The Martyr's memorial at Meerut commemorating the Indian rebels who died in the fighting in 1857

The regiment arrived in India in 1854. Initially sent to Meerut, the regiment were eventually sent to Lahore in 1857 on the eve of the Indian Rebellion. There they were stationed at the Meean Meer cantonment with three infantry battalions, one cavalry regiment, and some artillery units of the East India Company. On the eve of the mutiny, many of the officers were on leave, despite evidence that something was happening. When word reached the Punjab of the mutiny, the regiment disarmed the Company battalions at Meean Meer during a surprise parade inspection. The initial operation took the mutineers by surprise, and they were disarmed without no casualties. As the sepoy units at Meean Meer were being disarmed, three companies of the regiment tricked their way into the fort guarding Lahore, surprising and disarming the native infantry units there as well.

With the recapture of Delhi in September 1857, British control of the Punjab became easier as the rebellion in lost its momentum. By February 1858, the situation had improved to the point where the regiment could be transferred to the North-West Frontier. The regiment was assigned to Major-General Sir Sydney Cotton's Sittana Field Force. The objective of Cotton's command was to carry out a punitive expedition against Hindustani fanatics who had been instrumental in the mutiny of a native regiment stationed near Peshawar. Crossing through the Daran pass, the regiment participated in the destruction of the stronghold at Mangal Thana. After destroying the fortifications at Mangal Thana, the expedition turned its attention to the main fanatic base at Sittana. Despite resistance from the Fanactics, the upper and lower Sittana villages were captured by the British forces, including the regiment. After burning them to the ground, Cotton's expedition returned to British India. The success of the expedition resulted in a treaty between the various tribes and the British leading to the expulsion of the Hindustani Fanatics as well as an agreement by the various tribes to resist attempts by the Fanatics to return.

==== 1864 – 1874 England and Gibraltar ====
The regiment would not see any further active service in India during its tour of duty there. In 1864, after nearly ten years in India, the regiment returned to England after surviving sailing through a hurricane. The regiment would recruit and rotate through the various posts in England and Ireland from 1865 until 1870 when the regiment was once again posted to Gibraltar.

==== 1878 – 1881 Second Afghan War and Amalgamation ====
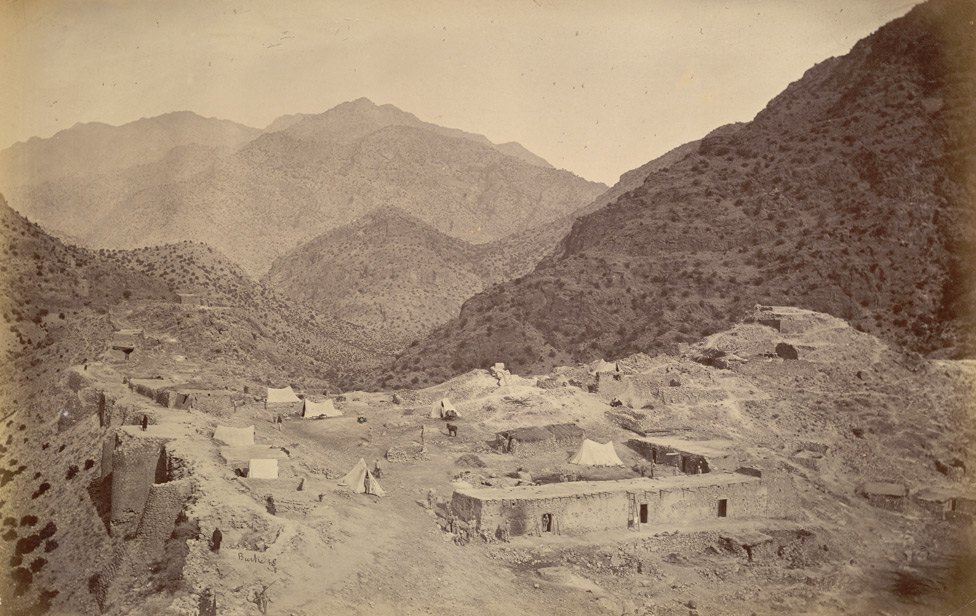
The interior of Ali Masjid, following the battle in November 1878

Returning to in India in 1878, the regiment was tasked with taking part in the Second Anglo-Afghan War. Assigned to The Peshawar Valley Field Force, under the command of Lieutenant General Sir Sam Browne, the regiment took part in the Battle of Ali Masjid in November 1878. As part of Brigadier-General Frederick Appleyard's brigade, the regiment participated in the front assault into the Khyber Pass.

As part of the Cardwell Reforms of the 1870s, where single-battalion regiments were linked together to share a single depot and recruiting district in the United Kingdom, the 81st was linked with the 47th (Lancashire) Regiment of Foot, and assigned to district no. 12 at Fulwood Barracks in Lancashire. On 1 July 1881 the Childers Reforms came into effect and the regiment amalgamated with the 47th (Lancashire) Regiment of Foot to form the Loyal North Lancashire Regiment.

== Battle honours ==
The regiment's battle honours were:

- Napoleonic Wars: Maida, Corunna, Peninsula
- Second Afghan War: Ali Masjid, Afghanistan 1878-9

== Colonels of the Regiment ==
Colonels of the Regiment were:

=== 81st Regiment of Foot ===
- 1793–1794: Gen. Albemarle Bertie, 9th Earl of Lindsey
- 1794–1795: Lt-Gen. Winter Blathwayte
- 1795–1797: Gen. Hon. Chapple Norton
- 1797: Gen. Gordon Forbes
- 1797–1798: Gen. Sir Hew Whitefoord Dalrymple, 1st Baronet
- 1798: Lt-Gen. John Graves Simcoe
- 1798–1819: Gen. Sir Henry Johnson, 1st Baronet., GCB
- 1819–1829: Gen. Sir James Kempt, GCB, GCH
- 1829–1840: Lt-Gen. Sir Richard Downes Jackson, KCB

=== 81st Regiment of Foot (Loyal Lincoln Volunteers) – (1832) ===
- 1840–1842: Maj-Gen. Sir John Waters, KCB
- 1842–1844: Lt-Gen. Sir Maurice Charles O'Connell, KCH
- 1844–1845: Gen. Sir George Henry Frederick Berkeley, KCB
- 1845–1847: Lt-Gen. Sir Neil Douglas, KCB, KCH
- 1847–1863: Gen. Thomas Evans, CB
- 1863–1879: Gen. William Frederick Forster, KH
- 1879–1881: Gen. Henry Renny, CSI

== Sources ==
- Paget, William Henry (1874). A record of the expeditions undertaken against the North-west frontier tribes. Calcutta: Office of Supt. of Govt. Printing.
- Paget, William Henry (1907). Frontier and overseas expeditions from India. Vol. I. Simla: Govt. Monotype Press.
- Rogers, S. (1872). Historical Record of The Eighty-First Regiment or Loyal Lincoln Volunteers Containing An Account Of The Regiment In 1793 And Of Its Subsequent Services To 1872. Gibraltar: The Twenty-Eighth Regimental Press.
