= John Alfred Street =

British Army general

General John Alfred Street CB

25th General Officer Commanding, Ceylon
- In office 1874–?
- Preceded by: Henry Renny
- Succeeded by: William Wilby

Personal details
- Born: 1822
- Died: 5 December 1889 (aged 66–67) Woking, Surrey
- Awards: CB

Military service
- Allegiance: United Kingdom
- Branch/service: British Army
- Rank: General
- Commands: General Officer Commanding, Ceylon

General John Alfred Street, CB (1822 – 5 December 1889) was a British Army officer who was the 25th General Officer Commanding, Ceylon.

== Early life ==
Street was the second child and eldest of three sons of Captain John Street (1791-1829), of the Royal Artillery, and Catherine, daughter of the lawyer and antiquarian Sir Henry Jardine of Harwood. His widowed mother subsequently married the geologist, chemist, and agricultural improver Sir George Mackenzie, 7th Baronet.

== Career ==
He joined the British Army as an ensign in 1839, became Lieutenant (by purchase) in 1841 and was promoted to captain in 1848. In 1842 he served in China with the 98th Foot during the First Opium War where he was present at the attack and capture of Chin Kiang Foo and at the Nanking landing.

In 1854 he was posted to Crimea as Brigade-Major of the 1st Brigade, 4th Division and was present at the battles of Balaklava, Inkerman and the Siege of Sebastopol. For his services he was awarded medal with three clasps, brevet of major, CB, Sardinian and Turkish medals and 4th class of the Medjidie.

Back in England he was commandant of the 10th Depot Battalion in Colchester before being appointed general officer commanding, Ceylon in 1874. He was succeeded there by William Wilby in 1879.

In 1882 he was given the colonelcy of the 2nd Battalion Cameronians (Scottish Rifles), which he held until his death. He was made full general on 23 October 1883.

== Personal life ==
Street married twice; firstly to Sophia, the daughter of Rev. James John Holroyd of White Hall, Colchester (fifth son of the lawyer Sir George Sowley Holroyd, Justice of the King's Bench, of the family of the Earl of Sheffield) and secondly to Caroline (born circa 1850), the daughter of Charles Horsfall Bill, of Storthes Hall, Yorkshire, and The Priory, Tetbury, Gloucestershire, head of a landed gentry family. Their only child was the author Cecil Street. He had two daughters by his first marriage; the elder, Sophia Catherine, married Lord Gifford, V.C. General Street, having retired from the Army at the age of sixty two just after his son's birth, died suddenly at the family home, Uplands, at Woking.

Military offices
Preceded by Henry Renny	General Officer Commanding, Ceylon; 1874–1879	Succeeded by William Wilby
