= Studholme John Hodgson =

General Studholme John Hodgson

23rd General Officer Commanding, Ceylon
- In office 1865–?
- Preceded by: Terence O'Brien
- Succeeded by: Henry Renny

Personal details
- Born: c. 1803
- Died: 30 August 1890 Torquay

Military service
- Allegiance: United Kingdom
- Branch/service: British Army
- Rank: General
- Commands: General Officer Commanding, Ceylon
- Battles/wars: First Anglo-Burmese War

Studholme John Hodgson (c. 1803 – 30 August 1890) was the General Officer Commanding, Ceylon.

== Military career ==
Hodgson was born in Ipswich and baptised on 5 May 1803. He was the son of General John Hodgson and Catherine Krempion. His younger brother, John Studholme Hodgson (1805-1870) was a major general in the Bengal Army.

Hodgson was commissioned as an ensign in the British Army on 30 December 1819. He first served in the 50th Regiment of Foot before being transferred to the 45th Regiment of Foot on 3 August 1820. He was promoted to lieutenant and transferred to the 83rd Regiment of Foot on 3 February 1825 to take the place of an officer who had died.

On 30 December 1826 he purchased the rank of captain. He was taken off half-pay on 14 November 1827 and transferred to the 39th Regiment of Foot; he was transferred again to the 19th Regiment of Foot on 21 September 1830.

He was made a brevet colonel on 20 June 1854 and a major general on 11 April 1860.

He was appointed as an honorary colonel of the 54th Regiment of Foot from 24 March 1868 to 21 November 1876. On 29 August 1868 he was promoted to lieutenant general.

He was promoted to general on 2 February 1876 and appointed honorary colonel of the 4th Regiment of Foot on 21 November.

He saw action in the First Anglo-Burmese War and went on to be General Officer Commanding, Ceylon in 1865. He then served as colonel of the 54th Regiment of Foot (1868–76) and the King's Own Royal Regiment (Lancaster) (1876–90).

== Personal life ==
Hodgson was the biological father of Lucien Bonaparte-Wyse, a French engineer instrumental in the decision to build the Panama Canal. Lucien's mother was Laetitia Bonaparte-Wyse, daughter of Lucien Bonaparte and estranged wife of the Irish politician Sir Thomas Wyse.

Military offices
Preceded by Terence O'Brien	General Officer Commanding, Ceylon; 1865–?	Succeeded by Henry Renny
Preceded by John Bell	Colonel of the King's Own Royal Regiment (Lancaster); 1876–1890	Succeeded by William Sankey
