= John Waters (British Army officer, born 1774) =

British Army officer (1774–1842)

Lieutenant-General Sir John Waters KCB
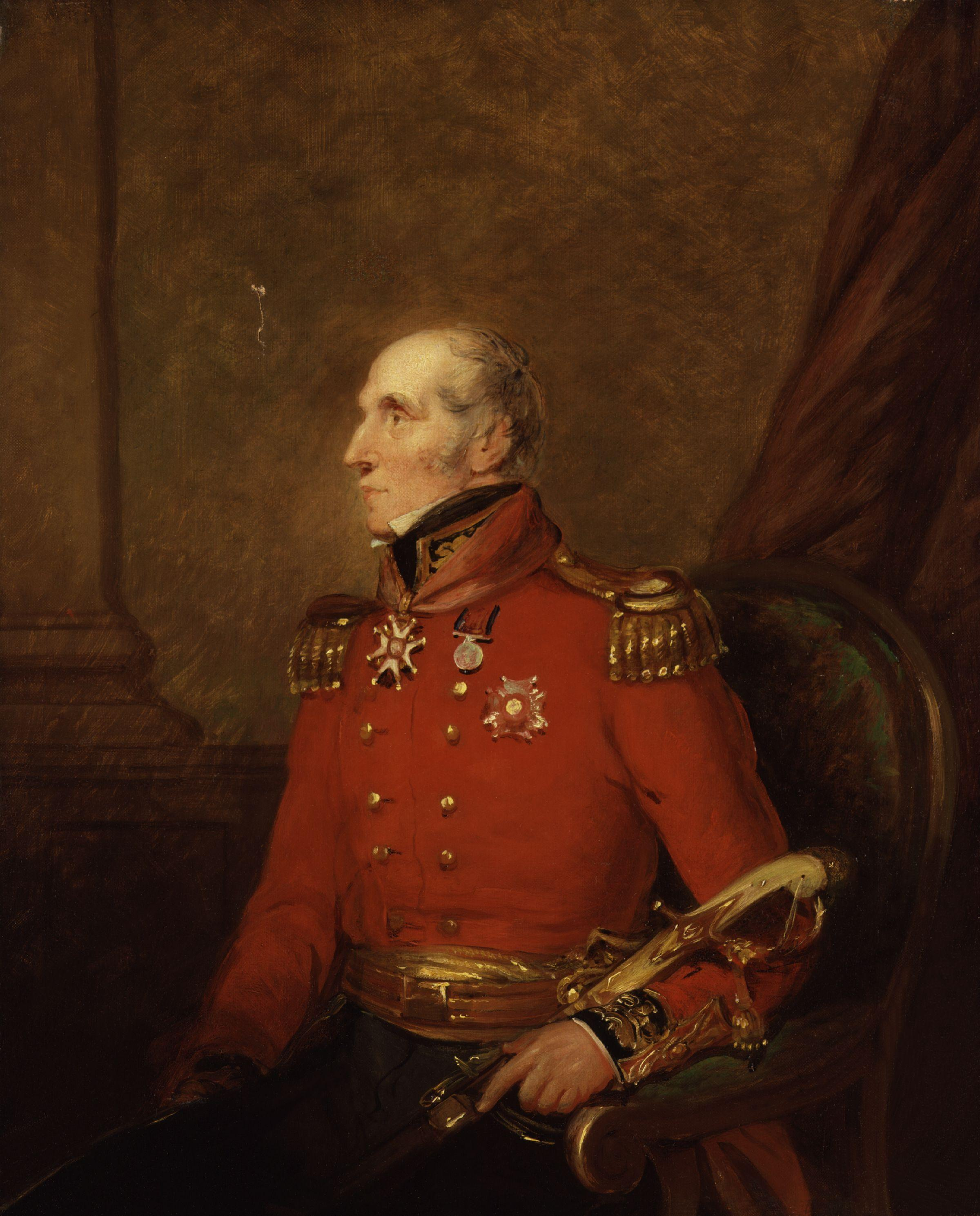
- Portrait, oil on canvas, by William Salter
- Born: 1774; Cefn Cribwr, Glamorgan, Great Britain
- Died: 21 November 1842 (aged 68); London, United Kingdom
- Military career
- Allegiance: United Kingdom
- Branch: British Army
- Service years: 1797–1842
- Rank: Lieutenant-General
- Conflicts: Napoleonic Wars
- Awards: Order of the Bath; Order of St. Anna

Lieutenant-General Sir John William Waters KCB (1774 – 21 November 1842) was a Welsh officer in the British Army during the Napoleonic Wars.

Waters joined the army in 1797; in 1805, was promoted captain, and in 1808, aide-de-camp to Brigadier Charles William Stewart (afterwards 3rd Marquis of Londonderry), after which he went to Portugal.

In 1809, Waters was attached to the Portuguese army. He served at Porto, Talavera, Busaco, Ciudad Rodrigo, Badajoz, Salamanca, and Vittoria, being mentioned in Wellington's Salamanca despatches. For his bravery in the field, he received a gold cross with four clasps, and was made C.B. in 1815.

Waters was at the battle of Waterloo as adjutant-general, where he was wounded. He was promoted colonel in 1821, and in 1841 lieutenant-general.

== Biography ==
Waters was born in 1774 at Ty Fry, near Welsh St. Donats, Glamorganshire. His grandfather, Edward Waters of Pittcott, was Sheriff of Glamorganshire in 1754. His father, whose name is not ascertained, died young, leaving a large family. The Marquis of Bute obtained a commission for the son in the 1st (Royal Scots) Foot on 2 August 1797. He joined the second battalion in Portugal, and served with it in the Anglo-Russian invasion of Holland in 1799, and the expedition to Egypt in 1801. He had become lieutenant on 15 February 1799, and in reward for his conduct during the mutiny at Gibraltar in 1802 the Prince Edward, Duke of Kent obtained a company for him in the York Rangers on 24 September 1803. He remained, however, with the Royal Scots, and went with it to the West Indies. On 28 February 1805 he was promoted captain in that regiment, to which two new battalions had been added, and soon afterwards he returned to England.

In August 1808, owing to the Duke of Kent's recommendation, he was made aide-de-camp to Brigadier Charles William Stewart (afterwards third Marquis of Londonderry). He went with him to Portugal, and served in Moore's Corunna campaign. Sent out to obtain intelligence of the French movements in December, he bought from the Spaniards at Valdestillas an intercepted French despatch from Berthier to Soult, which gave Moore most important information, and at once altered his plans. Waters was promoted major on 16 February 1809, and was attached to the Portuguese army (with the local rank of lieutenant-colonel), but employed on intelligence duties. Wellington wrote of him on 26 October, when he was going home for a time with Stewart:

He has made himself extremely useful to the British army by his knowledge of the languages of Spain and Portugal, by his intelligence and activity. I have employed him in several important affairs, which he has always transacted in a manner satisfactory to me; and his knowledge of the language and customs of the country has induced me to send him generally with the patrols employed to ascertain the position of the enemy, in which services he has acquitted himself most ably.

Wellington wished to have him definitely placed on his staff. The most conspicuous instance of his serviceableness was at the passage of the Douro on 12 May 1809. The French had broken the bridge and removed the boats, and they had ten thousand men on the opposite bank. "Colonel Waters, a quick, daring man, discovered a poor barber who had come over the river with a small skiff the previous night; and these two being joined by the prior of Amarante, who gallantly offered his services, crossed the water unperceived, and returned in half an hour with three large barges". In these barges the first troops passed.

On 3 April 1811, before the action of Sabugal began, Waters was made prisoner. "He had crossed the Coa to reconnoitre the enemy's position, as had been frequently his practice, without having with him any escort, and he was surrounded by some hussars and taken. He had rendered very important services upon many occasions in the last two years, and his loss is sensibly felt" (Wellington to Lord Liverpool 9 April 1811) He refused his parole, and was sent to Salamanca under a guard of four gendarmes. He was better mounted than they, and, having watched his opportunity, he put spurs to his horse. He was on a wide plain, with French troops before and behind him; and as he rode along their flank some encouraged, others fired at him. Passing between two of their columns he gained a wooded hollow, and baffled his pursuers. Two days afterwards he reached the British headquarters, "where Lord Wellington, knowing his resolute, subtle character, had caused his baggage to be brought, observing that he would not be long absent". On 15 April, Wellington appointed him (subject to confirmation) an assistant adjutant-general, and on 30 May he was made brevet lieutenant-colonel.

Waters served throughout the Peninsular War, being present at Porto, Talavera, Bussaco, Ciudad Rodrigo, Badajoz, Salamanca, Vittoria, the battle of the Pyrenees (during which he was wounded while speaking to Wellington), the Nivelle and Nive, Orthes and Toulouse. At Badajoz and Salamanca he acted as adjutant-general, and was mentioned in Wellington's Salamanca despatch. He received the gold cross with four clasps, and was made C.B. in 1815.

Waters was at Waterloo, and again acted as adjutant-general after Sir Edward Barnes was wounded, and signed the returns of the battle, though he was himself wounded also. He received the Russian Order of St. Anne (2nd class).

After being for a time on half-pay, he became captain and lieutenant-colonel in the Coldstream Guards on 15 May 1817. He was promoted colonel on 19 July 1821, and was again placed on half-pay on 15 February 1827. He became Major-General on 22 July 1830, was made Captain of Yarmouth Castle, Isle of Wight, on 22 April 1831, and K.C.B. on 1 March 1832. He was given the colonelcy of the 81st Foot on 15 June 1840, and was promoted lieutenant-general on 23 November 1841. He died in London on 21 November 1842, at the age of sixty-eight, and was buried at Kensal Green.

== Notes ==
Military offices
Preceded by Sir Richard Downes Jackson	Colonel of the 81st Regiment of Foot (Loyal Lincoln Volunteers); 1840–1842	Succeeded by Sir Maurice Charles O'Connell
