= John Hodgson (British Army officer) =

British Army officer (1757–1846)

General John Hodgson
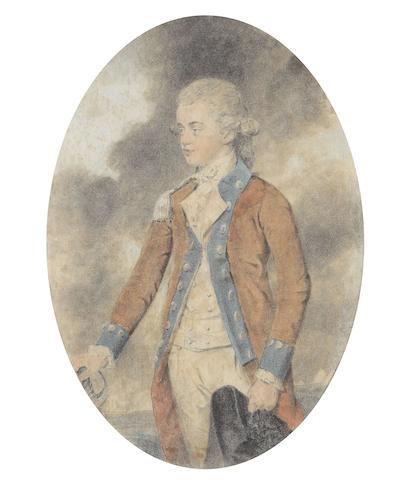
- Hodgson as a lieutenant
- Born: 1757
- Died: 10 January 1846 (aged 88–89)
- Military career
- Allegiance: United Kingdom
- Branch: British Army
- Rank: General
- Conflicts: French Revolutionary Wars

General John Studholme Hodgson (1757 – 10 January 1846) was a British Army officer who served as colonel of the 4th (King's Own) Regiment of Foot.

== Military career ==
Born the son of Field Marshal Studholme Hodgson and Catherine Howard (daughter of Lieutenant General Thomas Howard) and educated at Harrow School, Hodgson was commissioned as an ensign in the 4th (King's Own) Regiment of Foot on 20 May 1779.

He was dangerously wounded at the head of the King's Own Regiment in Holland in 1799 and was twice made prisoner of war by the French. He was captured by the French ship La Vengeance in 1797 during the French Revolutionary Wars and went on to be Governor, Commander-in-Chief, and Vice Admiral of Bermuda, with the rank of Brigadier, from 1806 to 1810. In 1811, by when he had been promoted to Major-General, he was appointed Governor and Commander-in-Chief of Curacao (ruled by Britain from 1807 to 1815). He also served as colonel of the 3rd Garrison Battalion of the 83rd Regiment of Foot and then as colonel of the 4th (King's Own) Regiment of Foot. (1835–46)

He was father of General Studholme John Hodgson. A memorial to him lies in St James's Church, Piccadilly.

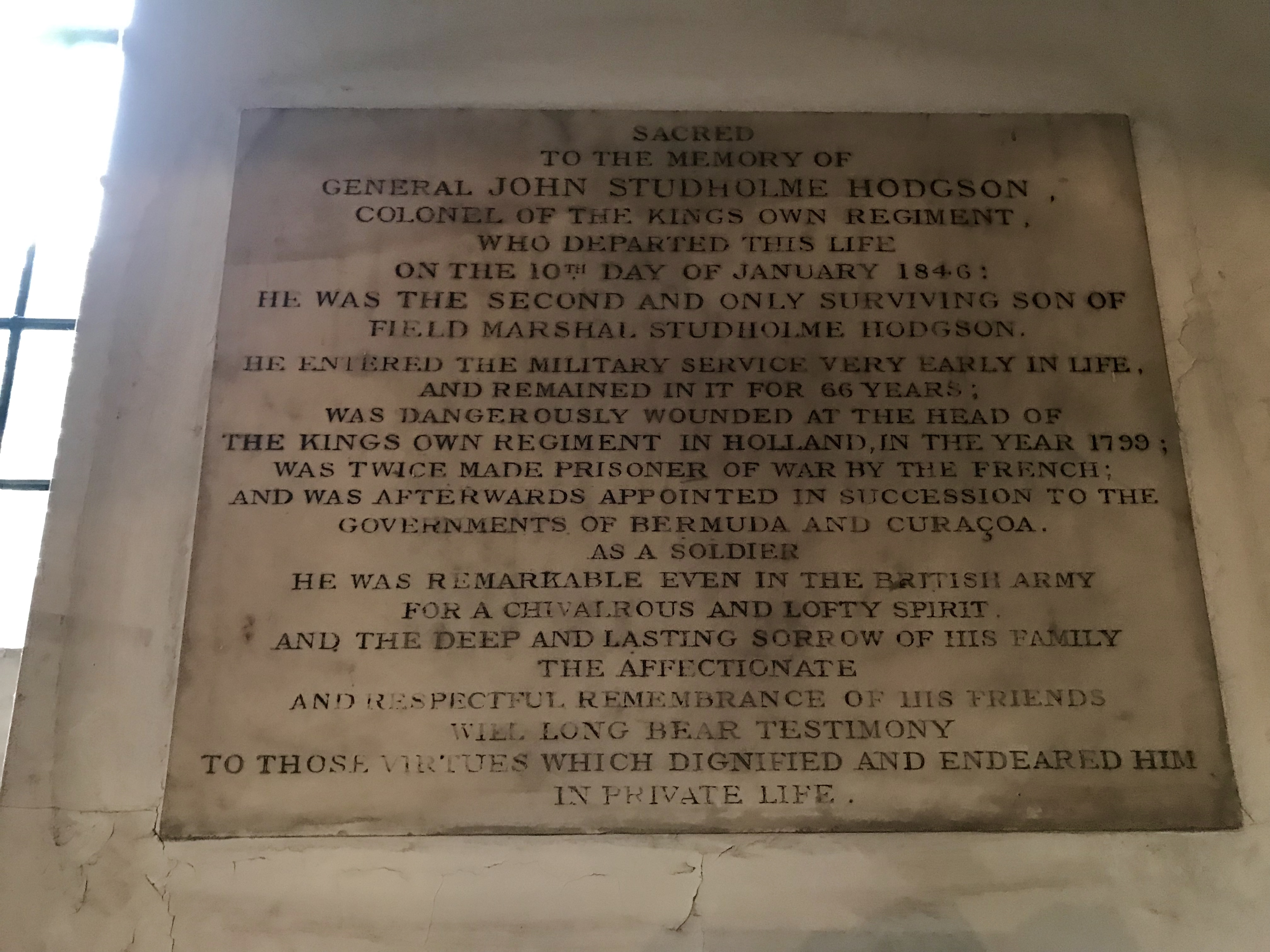
A memorial to Studholme John Hodgson in St James's Church, Piccadilly.

Government offices
Preceded by Henry Tucker	Governor of Bermuda; 1806–1810	Succeeded by Samuel Trott
Military offices
Preceded by John Pitt, 2nd Earl of Chatham	Colonel of the 4th (The King's Own) Regiment of Foot; 1835–1846	Succeeded by Thomas Bradford
