= George Bird (coffee planter) =

George Samuel Bird (1792 – 1 March 1857) was a British Army officer, and the first coffee planter in Ceylon.

== Biography ==
George Samuel Bird was born in 1792 in Goytre, Monmouthshire, Wales, the thirteenth child of Brevet Major Henry Bird (1748–1800) and Elizabeth née Hicks (1762–1842).

Bird joined Monmouth's East local militia on 12 February 1813.

The first coffee estate in Ceylon was opened near Gampola in 1824, by Bird, who accompanied his older brother, Lieutenant Colonel Henry Bird, of the 16th Regiment (1780–1829) to Ceylon in 1823, for the purpose of engaging in such agricultural undertaking as inducements in the island should appear to offer; and the attention of the brothers (Col. Bird being at that time Commandant of Kandy), was directed to the cultivation of coffee; and the valley of Gampola was selected as an eligible locality wherein to carry out their intended speculations. Sir James Campbell, the then Lieutenant Governor, gave encouragement to the proposed undertaking by promising a loan and a grant of land for the purpose, which was afterwards confirmed by Sir Edward Barnes (Governor of Ceylon), and thus commenced that cultivation on the site of two ancient Kandian palaces (Singapetia and Weyanpwatte). The mode of cultivation adopted, and the enormous protective duties then in favour of the British West Indies, rendered this, and two other coffee estates at Ganga Orowa and Matale that soon followed the one at Gampola, equally unprofitable. Col. Bird's death of cholera on 3 April 1829 so paralysed the operations at Gampola that George Bird was induced to abandon the property in 1833 and relocate to Kundasale, where together with Ackland Boyd and Company, they established a coffee plantation. Due to but the financial difficulties he was compelled again to abandon the plantation. He subsequently planted a third estate, with Mr Tindall at Imbulpitiya, in Oudabulatgaiunia however owing to age and infirmities had to abandon the venture and retire. Bird returned to his former residence at Kondasally, from where exhausted by a long protracted illness, he moved to the house of his nephew in Kandy. Bird also had investments in arrack renting and was the proprietor of the Udapalata tavern in 1825.

== Personal life ==
Bird married Charlotte Hook in 1828. They had nine children, with Charlotte dying during childbirth in 1842. Bird died of chronic diarrhoea in Kandy on 1 March 1857. Bird's nephew, Henry Byrde, Jr. reverted the spelling of the surname to an earlier version of the family name.

== See also ==
- Coffee production in Sri Lanka
- Jeronis de Soysa

== Bibliography ==
- Davis, J. (1813). The Royal Military Chronicle: Or, British Officers Monthly Register and Mentor. V.1-7, Nov.1810-Apr.1814; New Ser. V.1-6, May 1814-Apr.1817 (Public domain ed.). London: J. Davis.
- Ferguson, A. M.; Ferguson, J. (1878). Ceylon Handbook and Directory ... (Public domain ed.). Colombo.
- Moldrich, Donovan (1989). Bitter berry bondage: the nineteenth century coffee workers of Sri Lanka. Co-ordinating Secretariat for Plantation Areas.
- Perera, S. S. (1999). The Janashakthi Book of Sri Lanka Cricket, 1832-1996. Janashakthi Insurance.
