= Jeronis de Soysa =

Ceylonese entrepreneur and philanthropist

Gate Mudaliyar Jeronis de Soysa Dissanayake
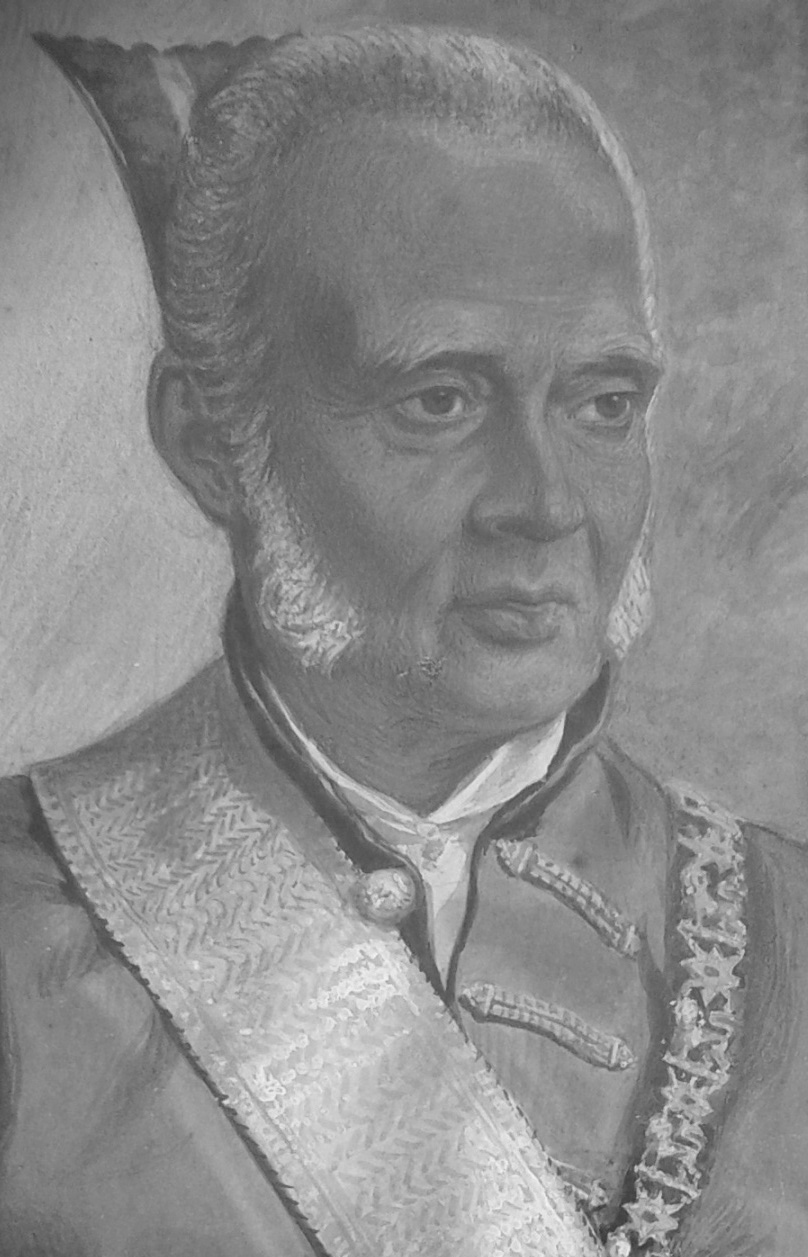
- Jeronis de Soysa, the uniform of a Gate Mudaliyar
- Born: 19 April 1797; Moratuwa, Ceylon
- Died: May 28, 1862 (aged 65); Colombo, British Ceylon
- Resting place: Holy Emmanuel Church
- Education: Palliyagodella Buddhist Temple
- Occupations: Coffee Planter, Industrialist and Ayurvedic Physician
- Known for: Entrepreneurship and Philanthropy
- Title: Wasala Mudaliyar
- Spouse: Francesca de Soysa Lamaethani
- Children: Charles Henry de Soysa
- Parent: Warusahennedige Joseph Soysa (1764-1839) Kurukulasuriya Senadige Francisca Peiris

Gate Mudaliyar Jeronis de Soysa (19 April 1797 – 28 May 1862) was a pioneering Ceylonese entrepreneur and philanthropist. He was a pioneer coffee planter and an industrialist who became the wealthiest Ceylonese of the 19th century by establishing the largest native commercial enterprise of the era. He was instrumental in the establishment of the first Ceylonese bank and is often referred to as a father of private enterprise in British Ceylon. He was the first Mudaliyar to be elevated in recognition of his philanthropy.

== Early life ==
Jeronis de Soysa was born on 19 April 1797 at Moratuwa. He was the second son of Warusahennadige Joseph Soysa (Jose Rala), an Ayurveda practitioner and Kurukulasuriya Senadige Francisca Peiris. He had seven brothers and three sisters and was affectionately known as Babaseñor. Both his father and grandfather Bastian Soysa and earlier ancestors; Don Francisco, Juan and Manual Soysa Muhandiram were salt and grain merchants having interests in the transportation, boat building and the agricultural sectors. Their ancestor was the lay custodian of the Devinuwara Temple, Matara at the time of its destruction by the Portuguese in 1587. De Soysa's parents originally wanted him to become a Buddhist monk and sent him to the Palliyagodella Temple Rawatawatta Moratuwa for studies. He excelled in the Ayurvedic system of medicine, the Sinhala language and Astrology. He became an Ayurvedic practitioner and possessed a charming personality. De Soysa married Francesca Coorey, daughter of Mututantrige Bastian Cooray and Kurukulasuriya Senadige Justina Pieris in 1833. Mututantrige Sebastian Coorey, an ancestor of Francesca had built the Rawatawatte Dutch Chapel in 1675.

== Trade and Industry ==
De Soysa inherited a small fortune from his uncles Daniel Peiris and Hendrick Peiris III, who were ship owners with Yatra building yards at Oruwella, Panadura and Grandpass, Colombo. He invested this in expanding the trading network between the Maritime and Kandyan Provinces with the assistance of his brothers. In 1820 he established himself as a general merchant in Kandy, becoming one of the first Sinhalese to do so. He introduced cart transportation between the seaports and the plantations which had till then been carried out on foot and was able to dominate the industry till the building of the railway. Meanwhile, de Soysa also became famous as Babasingha Vedamahatmaya, a sought-after Ayurvedic physician in Kandy and was reputed to have saved the lives of numerous plantation Tamils. De Soysa's business prospered and he received several government supply contracts, including one that involved in the construction of the Colombo-Kandy road. These investments enabled him to accumulate the large capital necessary to rent the franchising for the supply of arrack. Later, he curtailed his investment in the distillery and tavern industry.

In 1836 de Soysa bid for the Diyatalawa kanda 'Kings Garden-Rajmal Uyana' in Hanguranketha (against British planters such as George Bird) at the request of the administrative officer of the region that had been appointed by king Sri Vikrama Rajasinha. This was an overgrown coffee (flower) estate previously used by the Kandyan kings as a country retreat. He also purchased many of the cinnamon estates that were previously owned by the Dutch administration in Moratuwa, Ratmalana, Dambuwa and Katunayake, citronella plantations in Ahangama and coconut plantations throughout the island. His land holdings in Colombo consisted of several estates that stretched between Galle Face and Panadura. The De Soysa and Peiris family established the first Ceylonese-owned bank, the Bank of Kandy at Dalada Weediya and Pettah, Colombo in 1839 & 1860, at a time when European owned banks were reluctant to extend credit to the Ceylonese and the high interest rates of the Nattukkottai Chettiars. De Soysa was also reputed for his treatment of employees and had relied to a greater extent on the low country population. He played a significant role in improving agriculture and the infrastructure in the Kandyan province and the coastal districts.

== Philanthropy ==
=== Agriculture and infrastructure ===
De Soya's agricultural properties in the up-country were mostly in the Hanguranketha, Haragama and Talatuoya areas which were then thick jungle with no roads. He took the lead and with an improvised measuring stick demarcated the areas to be cleared for road and tank building. He had a network of roads built and supplemented the village infrastructure by building reservoirs for irrigating paddy fields and chena cultivations.

The large scale road building projects of de Soysa include the road from Mailapitiya to Hanguranketha and Haragama and the road from Haragama to Kolongaha and Maha Oya in the Central Province. He also had the Polgasowita-Mattegoda-Delgahakanda roads of Salpiti Korale constructed. In 1839 he constructed the road from Galle road to Kospalankissa and several roads in Chilaw district. The roads from Telawela to Katubedda and Mampe, the Angulana road to Kuda-Kalapuwa and the Uyana road were also constructed in the Western Province.

De Soysa was also an avid builder of tanks and reservoirs. In 1848 he rebuilt the ancient Malulla tank (Maloluwawe) at Hanguranketa. The Gonagama, Talatuoya, Naranvila, Kandewela and Gonawatte tanks and dams of the Central Province and the Moratuwa-Ratmalana tank in his home town are noteworthy. He also facilitated irrigation works at Kandewela and gifted land to the poor residents of Gonagama and Hanguranketa for cultivation.

De Soysa also built the Tibotuwawewatte Ambalama in Haragama and the sprawling rest house and gardens at Moratuwa for public use. As a result of the medical and financial assistance given to the landslide victims of Kadugannawa, de Soysa's caravans were safeguarded by Saradiel, the Robin Hood of Ceylon. De Soysa had also met Puran Appu, a hero of the Matale Rebellion, who had on occasion disguised himself as a carter in spying missions to Kandy.

=== Religious and educational work ===
On his land stood the ancient temple; Pothgul Viharaya of Hanguranketha, which was in a state of collapse. After rebuilding and renovating the temple he nominated the Ven. Attadassi Thero as its Chief Incumbent and gifted the surrounding lands to the Temple. De Soysa also built a Chaitya in Moratuwa to enshrine the ashes of his teacher Ven. Meddegama Thero.

He built and financed a free primary school and facilitated an Oriental Library in Hanguranketa. He empowered the traditional Gam Sabhas, established a Legal Aid Society, a library and an association for social reform (Sadarana Sarana Samagama) in Moratuwa.

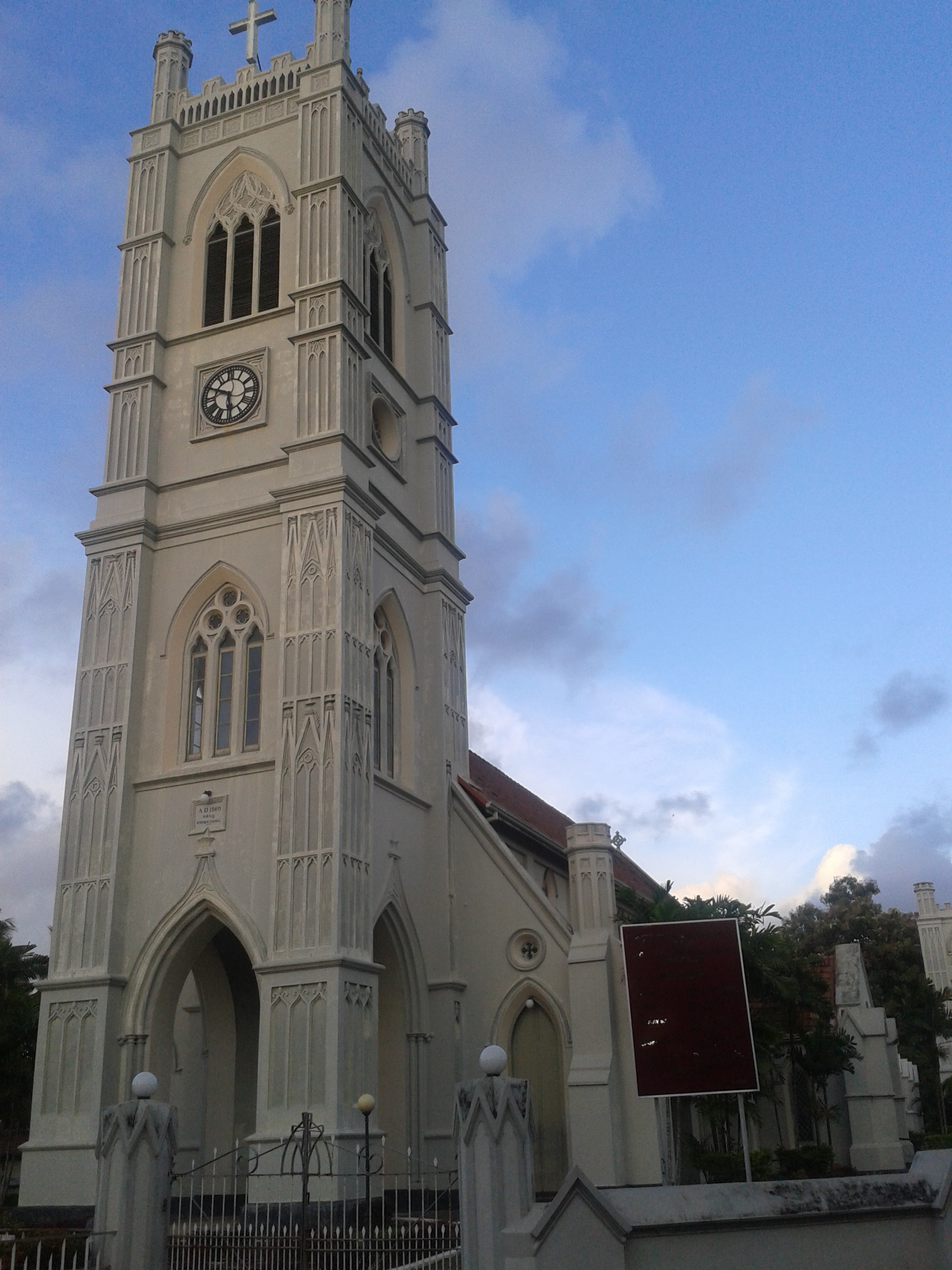
The Holy Emmanuel Church (1860) was the tallest building in Ceylon

Towards the end of his life, de Soysa embraced Christianity in appreciation of the blessings and recognition that had been bestowed on him. To commemorate this event the Mudaliyar decided to build the Holy Emmanuel Church. On 27 December 1857, Bishop James Chapman laid the cornerstone of the church, designed by Thomas Skinner. On 27 December 1860, the Holy Emmanuel Church was consecrated by Dr. James Chapman, the first Bishop of Colombo and the event was attended by the Governor Charles Justin MacCarthy. His brother Mudaliyer Susew de Soysa (1809-1881) gifted an estate opposite the Mount Lavinia Hotel for its maintenance and a part of it was later transferred to relocate S. Thomas' College.

== Death ==
Jeronis de Soysa Dharmagunawardane Vipulajayasuriya Karunaratne Dissanayake died at the age of 65 on 28 May 1862. He was buried in the Holy Emmanuel Church, engraved as per his wishes using the Sinhala script.

== Legacy ==
De Soysa, often referred to as a father of private enterprise was the pioneer native entrepreneur, philanthropist and social reformer who played the role of a path-finder. He died, leaving Charles de Soysa, aged 26, entrusted with the management of an estate worth millions. His infrastructure and tank building projects were commendable, considering the fact that it came after the abolition of the traditional rajakriya system of free compulsory labour and the devastation caused following the Kandyan convention. In 1853, de Soysa was appointed Gate Mudaliyar by the Governor George William Anderson. He was the first native headman to be appointed for public benefactions as opposed to government service.

== See also ==
- Coffee production in Sri Lanka
