= Holy Emmanuel Church, Moratuwa =

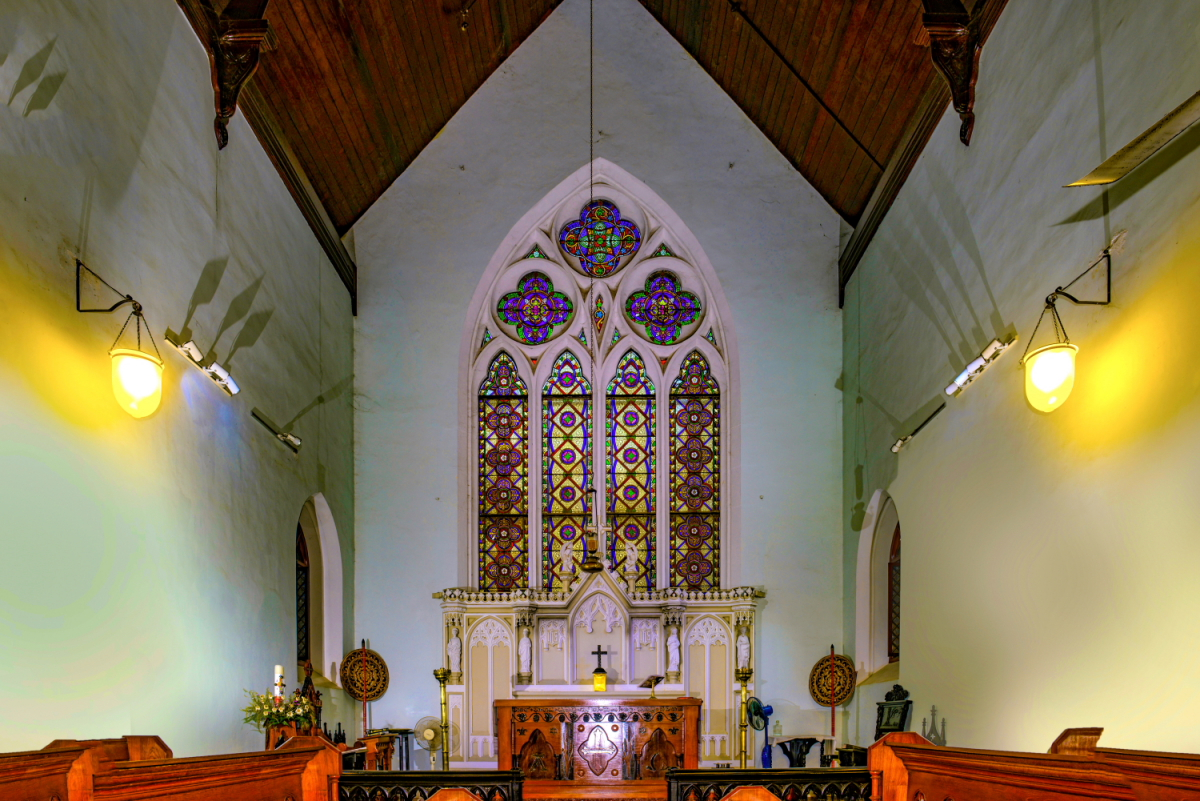
- Church chancel, altar and stained glass windows

- Location within Central Colombo
- 6.78491936484°N 79.8867843811°E
- Location: Holy Emmanuel Road, Moratuwa, Sri Lanka
- Denomination: Anglican
- Website: Holy Emmanuel Church, Moratuwa

History
- Consecrated: 27 December 1860

Architecture
- Functional status: Active
- Architect: Thomas Skinner
- Architectural type: Church
- Style: Victorian Gothic
- Groundbreaking: 1857
- Construction cost: £5,338

Specifications
- Length: 32 m (105 ft)

Administration
- Metropolis: Archbishop of Canterbury
- Diocese: Colombo

Clergy
- Vicar: Rev. Malinda de Mel

Holy Emmanuel Church is an Anglican church in Moratuwa, Sri Lanka (a southern suburb of Colombo). The current church building was officially consecrated in 1860 but the site has been used for religious services since 1799.

== History ==
In 1675 the Dutch constructed a building on the site of the current church cemetery. The building was subsequently used as a school and from 1799 for religious services. In 1815 it was demolished and the first Anglican Church was built on the site. The church was funded by the Governor Robert Brownrigg and the local congregation. The church was popularly known as the "Brownrigg Palliya", with a capacity to hold 800 to 1,000 people.

On 4 January 1857, Gate Mudaliyar Jeronis de Soysa requested the Bishop of Colombo, James Chapman, seek Governor Henry Ward's approval to demolish the old church building and construct a new church on a 1.5 acres (0.61 ha) adjacent to the cemetery. On 31 January Governor Ward granted approval for the new church and on 27 December Bishop Chapman laid the foundation stone for the building. It was designed by Thomas Skinner and completed at a cost of over £5,338, with the funds mainly contributed by Jeronis de Soysa and his brother Susew de Soysa. On 18 December 1860 de Soysa transferred the title of the land to the Anglican Church.

On 27 December 1860, the Holy Emmanuel Church was consecrated by Bishop Chapman. Governor Charles Justin MacCarthy and his wife, together with a number of notable Europeans were present at the consecration service.

== Architecture ==
The church was designed by Major Thomas Skinner, an engineer who worked in the Public Works Department, in a Victorian Gothic style. The dominant feature is the landmark 37 m (120 ft) bell tower at the entrance of the church. The church is 32 m (105 ft) in length, with the roof of the nave resting on six arches. The stained glass windows were imported from England. The pipe organ was donated in 1902 by the Mendis brothers.

== Commemoration ==
On 27 December 2010 Sri Lanka Post issued a Rs.5 postal stamp commemorating the 150th anniversary of the church.
