= Coffee production in Sri Lanka =

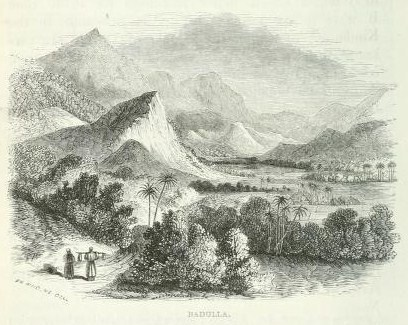
Plate from Ceylon, Physical, Historical and Topographical, titled "The Coffee Regions. Badulla"

Coffee production in Sri Lanka peaked in 1870, with over 111,400 hectares (275,000 acres) being cultivated. The Dutch had experimented with coffee cultivation in the 18th century. Still, it was not successful until the British began large-scale commercial production following the Colebrooke–Cameron Commission reforms of 1833. By 1860, the country was amongst the major coffee-producing nations in the world. Although coffee production remains a source of revenue, it is no longer a main economic sector. In 2014, the country ranked 43rd-largest coffee producer in the world.

== History ==
The first arabica coffee plants introduced to Ceylon may have arrived from Yemen via India, by Muslim pilgrims in the early 17th century. However, the Sinhalese were unaware of the use of berries in preparing a beverage. They only used the young leaves for curries and the flowers as offerings at their temples.

The Dutch undertook the first attempt at systematic cultivation of coffee in 1740. Prior to commencing large-scale coffee cultivation, the Dutch conducted preliminary trials at the Highwalton Estate in Matale in 1740 to assess the suitability of Sri Lankan climatic conditions and soil fertility for coffee saplings. It was initiated by Governor Baron van Imhoff and his successors; van Gollenesse and Loten. However, it was confined to the low-country and was relatively unsuccessful with low levels of production. Production was also restricted by the Dutch East India Company as they did not want competition against coffee produced on their plantations in Java. By 1762, annual coffee production was only 100,000 pounds.

The British, who first arrived on the island in 1796 and took control in 1815, continued experiments with coffee production. These early ventures, mainly in the coastal areas around Galle, failed due to the unsuitability of the area for coffee cultivation. The first to successfully grow coffee on a commercial scale was George Bird, who established a coffee plantation in Singhapitiya. Edward Barnes, who became Governor of Ceylon in 1824, established another plantation in Gannoruwa in 1825 (now a part of the Royal Botanical Gardens, Peradeniya). These were followed by a number of other government officials establishing plantations in the region. The only native to grow coffee on a commercial scale was Jeronis de Soysa and about a quarter of the total production was from the smallholdings of native farmers. Most of these early ventures were economically unsuccessful, due to a number of factors including unsuitability of the lowland areas, competition from the West Indies, lack of cultivation skills and poor infrastructure. The first plantation in the mountainous Kandyan area, was established in 1827 which, a few years later, spread to many other areas in the country, becoming profitable.

Coffee growing regions areas of Sri Lanka Cultivation of Coffea arabica Cultivation of Coffea robusta

At the initiative of the British colonial administration, Sri Lanka experimented with coffee as a plantation crop in the 1830s. Sri Lankan coffee cultivation and export prospered when the West Indies ended slavery, which affected its extensive coffee production. Further expansion occurred when the British government in Sri Lanka sold government lands they had obtained through the Crown Lands Ordinance. Tamil labour from South India was recruited by the 1830s. During the period 1830–1850, coffee production assisted in the country's development and a capitalist society emerged. The Bank of Ceylon supported the proliferation of coffee estates, which resulted in infrastructure development within the Kandyan Provinces. During the period of worldwide economic depression in 1846, production declined, conflicts arose, and taxes were levied to compensate the losses to the economy, due to the falling price of coffee. Labour conscription was introduced in 1848, causing a rebellion, which was later quelled. However, the plantation era transformed Sri Lanka; nearly one-third of the plantation area was owned by the local people. With high demand and prices for coffee in the European market, coffee planting increased. Investors flocked to Ceylon from overseas and around 100,000 ha (386 sq mi) of rain forest was cleared to make way for coffee plantations. The term "Coffee rush" was coined to describe this developing situation in 1840. By 1860, Sri Lanka, Brazil and Indonesia, were the three largest coffee-producing countries in the world.

In 1869, the coffee industry was still thriving in Ceylon, but shortly afterwards, coffee plantations were devastated by the fungal disease Hemileia vastatrix, also known as coffee leaf rust (CLR), affecting not only Sri Lanka but other areas in Asia over the next 20 years. The planters nicknamed the disease "Devastating Emily". Production dipped rapidly and by 1900, coffee was only being cultivated on 4,610 hectares (11,392 acres) and was replaced by tea.

== Production ==
According to records of the Food and Agriculture Organization for 2019, coffee production was at 7,688 tons from an area of 6,445 hectares (15,930 acres), at a yield rate of 6,373 hectogram per hectare. During the period 1961 to 2013, the highest production was 25,575 tons in 1967, and the lowest was 4,109 tons in 1988. In 2019, the country was the thirty-fifth largest producer in the world. In recent years, Sri Lankan coffee production increased 84%, to nearly $355,000 by 2019. Past 10 years growth arabica coffee, which grows particularly well in the wetland and hill country. Most coffee production, nearly 80%, originated from the small holdings sector.

== Revival ==
Coffee production in Sri Lanka is seeing signs of revival. Use of high-quality local beans for serving coffee has increased since 2014, with more cafes and restaurants in Colombo and other cities sourcing coffee beans from local farmers rather than importing.

== See also ==
- List of countries by coffee production
- Tea production in Sri Lanka

== Bibliography ==
- Amarasinghe, Samanga (2011). Independence to Freedom. Lulu.com. ISBN 978-1-105-01908-1.
- Illy, Andrea; Viani, Rinantonio (2005). Espresso Coffee: The Science of Quality. Academic Press. ISBN 978-0-12-370371-2.
- Reddy, L. R. (2003). Sri Lanka Past and Present. APH Publishing. ISBN 978-81-7648-449-7.
- Silva, Rasangika De (2005). "Sri Lankawe Te Wagawe Arambaya". Sri Lankawe Te Ithihasaya (1st ed.). Samanthi Publishers. p. 27. ISBN 955-8596-32-9.
