= John Wilson (British Army officer, died 1856) =

Governor of Ceylon

General Sir John Wilson KCB

Acting Governor of British Ceylon
- In office 13 October 1831 – 23 October 1831
- Monarch: William IV
- Preceded by: Edward Barnes
- Succeeded by: Robert Wilmot-Horton
- In office 19 March 1811 – 11 March 1812
- Monarch: George III
- Preceded by: Thomas Maitland
- Succeeded by: Robert Brownrigg

9th & 15th General Officer Commanding, Ceylon
- In office 1811–?
- Preceded by: Thomas Maitland
- Succeeded by: Robert Brownrigg
- In office 14 October 1831 – ?
- Preceded by: Hudson Lowe
- Succeeded by: Robert Arbuthnot

Personal details
- Born: 1780
- Died: 1856 (aged 75–76)

Military service
- Allegiance: United Kingdom
- Branch/service: British Army
- Rank: General
- Commands: General Officer Commanding, Ceylon

General Sir John Wilson KCB (1780–1856) was a British Army officer who served in the Peninsular War, and was acting Governor of British Ceylon in 1831.

He entered the British Army as an ensign in the 28th Foot in 1794 and was promoted lieutenant the following year.

He fought in the Capture of St Lucia and of St Vincent in 1796. In July of that year he was captured and exchanged in Guadaloupe, but was captured again in 1797. He was however able to rejoin his regiment in Gibraltar and take part in the Capture of Minorca in 1798. In 1799 he was given the command of a company in the newly formed Minorca Regiment which was posted to Egypt in 1801, where Wilson took part in the Battle of Alexandria. He was promoted Major in 1802.

In 1808 the Minorca Regiment, now renamed The Queen's Own German Regiment, was sent to Portugal, where Wilson was severely wounded at the Battle of Vimiero. In 1809 he was back on the Peninsular as part of the Loyal Lusitanian Legion under Sir Robert Wilson, harassing the French in the vicinity of Ciudad Rodrigo. In 1810 he was made Chief of Staff under Silveira, a Commander of the Portuguese troops. In 1911 he was made Governor of the province of Minho.

In 1813 he rejoined Wellington's army, commanding a Portuguese brigade at the Siege of San Sebastian, the Passage of the Bidassoa and the Battle of Nivelle. He was again severely wounded near Bayonne. He was made brevet colonel and knighted in 1814, and made a CB the following year.

Promoted Major-general in 1825, Wilson commanded the British troops in Ceylon from 1831 to 1839, acting as governor for a short period. He was made KCB in 1837 and promoted Lieutenant-general in 1838.

In 1835 he fought a duel with Charles Marshall, the Chief Justice, which took place in the Cinnamon Gardens, Colombo, once a plantation.

In 1836 he was given the colonelcy of the 82nd Foot, transferring to the 11th Foot in 1841, a position he held until his death. He was promoted full general on 20 June 1854.

He died in his London home in 1856.

Government offices
Preceded by Edward Barnes	Acting; Governor of British Ceylon; 1831-1831	Succeeded by Robert Wilmot-Horton
Military offices
Preceded by Thomas Maitland	General Officer Commanding, Ceylon; 1811–1812	Succeeded by Robert Brownrigg
Preceded by Hudson Lowe	General Officer Commanding, Ceylon; 1831–1839	Succeeded by Robert Arbuthnot
Preceded by Sir Rufane Shaw Donkin	Colonel of the 11th (the North Devonshire) Regiment of Foot; 1841–1856	Succeeded by William George Cochrane
Preceded by Sir Henry Pigot	Colonel of the 82nd (The Prince of Wales's Volunteers) Regiment of Foot; 1836–1841	Succeeded by Sir Andrew Pilkington
