= Thomas Skinner (British Army officer, born 1804) =

British Army officer and engineer (1804–1877)

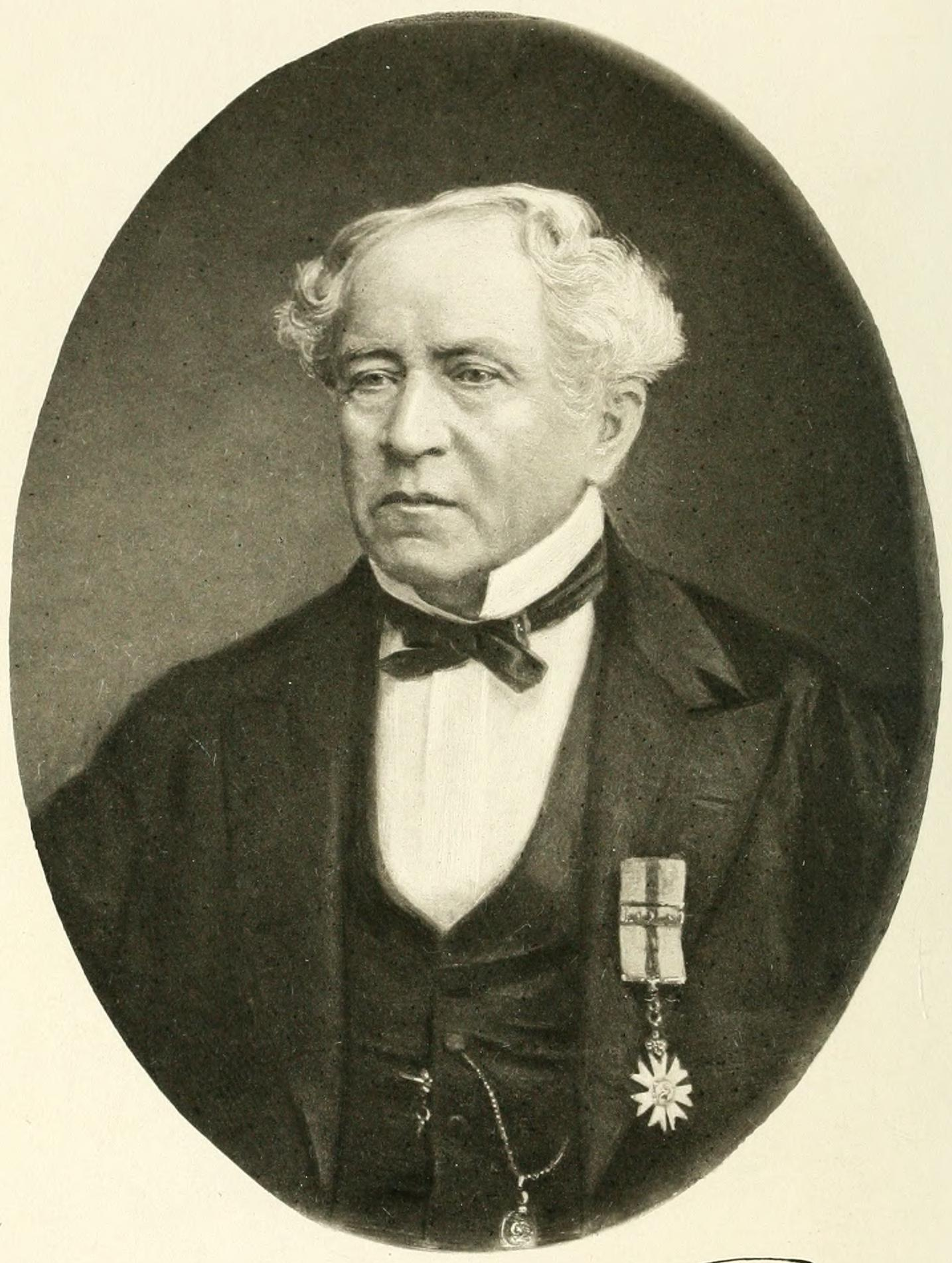
- Born: 22 May 1804; St. John's, Newfoundland
- Died: 24 July 1877 (aged 73); Grosvenor Place, Bath, England
- Military career
- Service years: 1819–1867
- Rank: Major
- Unit: Ceylon Rifle Regiment
- Conflicts: 1848 Rebellion
- Awards: CMG
- Other work: Surveyor General, Commissioner of Highways

Major Thomas Bridges Boucher Skinner CMG (22 May 1804 – 24 July 1877) was a British Army officer and engineer. He was a prominent road builder in Ceylon (present-day Sri Lanka).

== Career ==
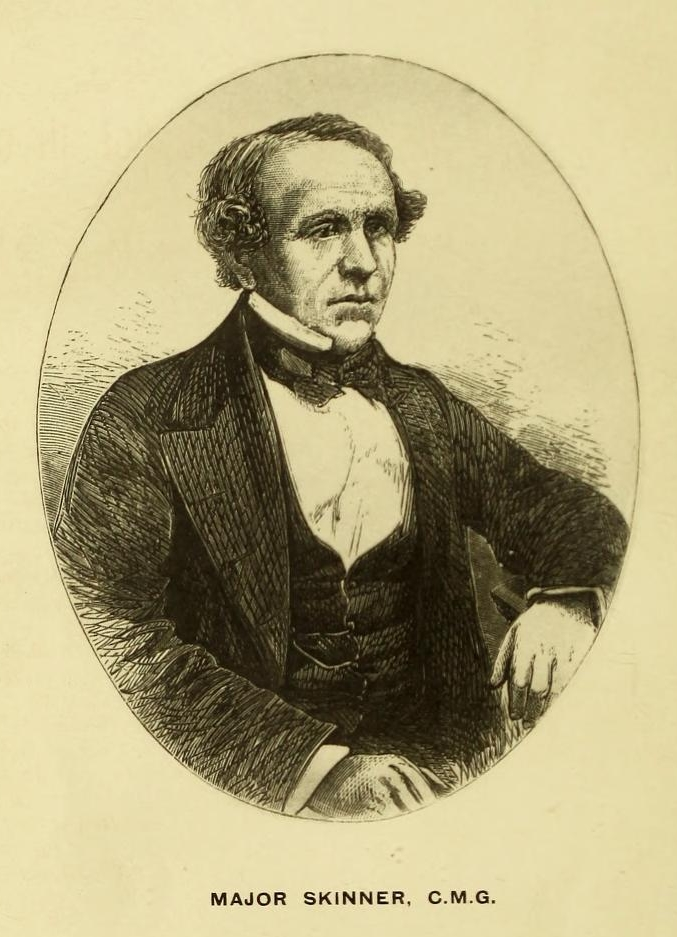

Skinner was born in St. John's, Newfoundland, on 22 May 1804, to William Thomas Skinner, a lieutenant-colonel in the Royal Artillery, and his second wife Mary, daughter of Dr Monier of the Royal Artillery. In 1811, he moved to England with his father and studied in Shaftesbury, Dorsetshire. Dissatisfied with education, he went to Ceylon in 1819 to visit his father who was stationed in Trincomalee. There he was commissioned in Ceylon Rifle Regiment as a second lieutenant. His first job was to carry a platoon of soldiers from Trincomalee to Colombo, shortly after the 1818 rebellion that was not completely suppressed yet.

Soon after, Skinner was appointed to the public works department which is responsible for building the roads in the island. He gained his lifelong lasting fame for constructing the Colombo–Kandy highway. He was appointed as head of the Colombo defence guard in 1825, lieutenant quartermaster general and surveyor general in 1833, and commissioner of highways in 1841. He is also noted for mapping previously uncharted parts of Ceylon. On 19 December 1838, he married Georgina, daughter of Lieutenant-General George Burrell.

In 1848, Skinner gave a testimony before a Special Working Committee of the British House of Commons on the Matale Rebellion. His statement exposed the maladministration of the British that led to the rebellion and how British policies altered traditional ways of life of the native Sinhalese.

In 1857, Skinner designed the Holy Emmanuel Church in Moratuwa for Mudaliyar Jeronis de Soysa. He retired from civil service in 1867, and was celebrated for his achievements by the British administration, planters, newspapers as well as local Mudaliyars. He went to England and received a CMG from Queen Victoria in the 1869 Birthday Honours. Skinner wrote an autobiography, Fifty Years in Ceylon, edited by his daughter Annie and published in 1891.

Skinner had six children: Marianne Theresa (1839–1901); Thomas Edward Burnes (c.1842-1902) who served as the Postmaster General of Ceylon, between 1871 and 1896; George Burrell (c.1844-1883) a captain in the 15th Regiment; William Graham (C.1846-?) joined the Oriental Bank, and died after falling from his horse in Bombay; Henry Peareth (c.1848-?); Monier Williams (1849–1928) a Commander in the Royal Navy; and Anne Harriet Barbara (1852-?).

== Bibliography ==
- Skinner, Thomas (1891). Skinner, Annie (ed.). Fifty Years in Ceylon. London: W. H. Allen & Co.

== See also ==
- List of famous big game hunters
