= Alexander Cosby Jackson =

British Army general (1773–1827)

Major-General Alexander Cosby Jackson

11th General Officer Commanding, Ceylon
- In office 1812–1820
- Preceded by: Robert Brownrigg
- Succeeded by: Edward Barnes

Personal details
- Born: Alexander Cosby Jackson; 16 October 1772 Bombay, India
- Died: 29 January 1827 (aged 54) Dawlish, Devonshire, England
- Spouse: Elizabeth Catherine Mitchell (1792-1861)
- Children: Charles Robert Mitchell Jackson
- Occupation: British Military Army

Military service
- Allegiance: United Kingdom
- Branch/service: British Army
- Rank: Major-General
- Unit: 66th (Berkshire) Regiment of Foot
- Commands: General Officer Commanding, Ceylon

Major-General Alexander Cosby Jackson (1773–1827) was the 11th General Officer Commanding, Ceylon. He was appointed in 1812. He was succeeded by Edward Barnes in 1820.

Military offices
Preceded by Robert Brownrigg	General Officer Commanding, Ceylon; 1812–1820	Succeeded by Edward Barnes
