= Edward Paget =

British Army officer, politician and colonial administrator (1775–1849)

General The Honourable Sir Edward Paget GCB
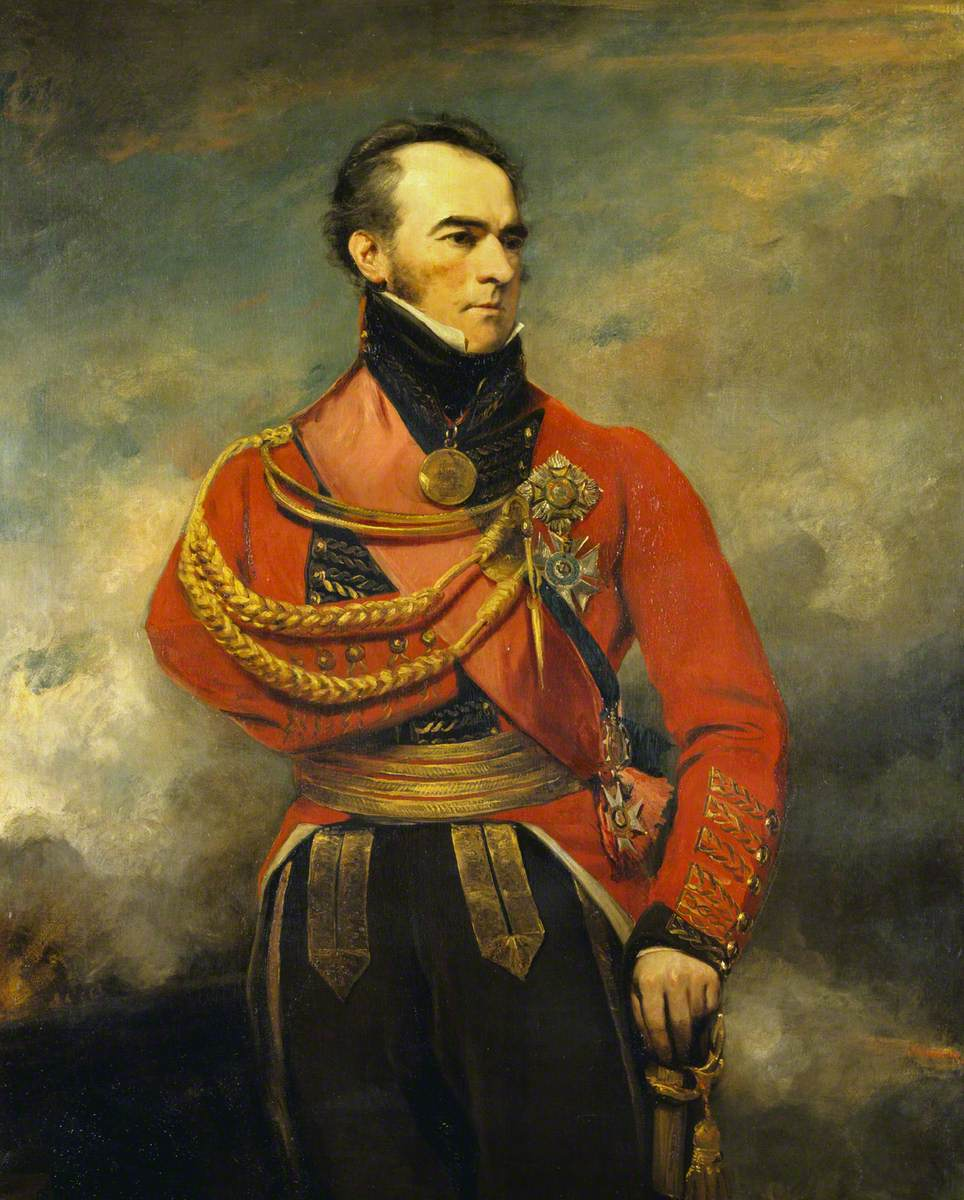
- Portrait attributed to Martin Archer Shee, c. 1814

4th Governor of British Ceylon
- Monarch: George IV
- Preceded by: Edward Barnes (Acting governor)
- Succeeded by: James Campbell (Acting governor)

Personal details
- Born: 3 November 1775
- Died: 13 May 1849 (aged 73)
- Awards: Knight Grand Cross of the Order of the Bath

Military service
- Allegiance: United Kingdom
- Branch/service: British Army
- Rank: General
- Battles/wars: Peninsular War

General Sir Edward Paget GCB (3 November 1775 – 13 May 1849) was a British Army officer, politician, courtier and colonial administrator.

== Early life and family ==
Edward Paget was born the fourth son and sixth child of Henry Paget, 1st Earl of Uxbridge.

During the course of his life, he and several of his 11 siblings achieved played a prominent role in British military and policital life; his eldest brother Henry William, 2nd Earl of Uxbridge (1768–1854), was in 1815 created Marquess of Anglesey and is best remembered for leading the charge of the heavy cavalry at the Battle of Waterloo. The third eldest brother, Sir Arthur Paget (1771–1840), was an eminent diplomat during the Napoleonic Wars, the fifth, Sir Charles Paget (1778–1839), served with distinction in the navy, and rose to the rank of vice-admiral.

Paget's sisters were each married to prominent aristocrats and military figures; they included Caroline, Countess of Enniskillen, Mary, Baroness Graves, Jane Stewart, Countess of Galloway, and Louisa, Lady Erskine.

=== Marriages and issue ===
On 22 May 1805 Paget married The Hon. Frances Bagot, youngest daughter of William Bagot, 1st Baron Bagot. The couple had one child:

- The Reverend Francis Edward Paget (24 May 1806 – 4 August 1882).

Frances Paget did not long survive the birth of her only child; within a week of his birth she died on 30 May 1806.

On 22 February 1815 Paget was married for a second time to Lady Harriet Legge, daughter of George Legge, 3rd Earl of Dartmouth. The marriage produced eight children:

- Major Henry William Paget (14 February 1816 – 17 January 1853), married in 1851 to Anna Matilda Catherine Walker, daughter of Sir George Townshend Walker, 1st Baronet
- Frances Jane Paget (2 May 1817 - 26 August 1903) married in 1843 to John Butler, 2nd Marquess of Ormonde
- Harriet Mary Paget (1819 - 30 September 1906)
- Lt Col Patrick Lewis Cole Paget (10 February 1820 – 17 July 1879).
- Caroline Paget (9 October 1823 - 17 July 1894) married The Hon. and Reverend John Venables-Vernon, son of Henry Venables-Vernon, 3rd Baron Vernon
- The Reverend Edward Heneage Paget (23 July 1828 – 29 September 1884) married The Hon. Emma Mary Eden, daughter of Robert Eden, 3rd Baron Auckland.
- Mary Georgiana Paget (1829 - 30 April 1902)

== Career ==
=== Soldier ===
Edward Paget became a cornet in the 1st Regiment of Life Guards in 1792.

In 1808, he was with John Moore in Gothenburg to assist the Swedish in the Finnish War. Moore's disagreements with Gustavus IV soon led to their being sent home where they were ordered to Portugal.

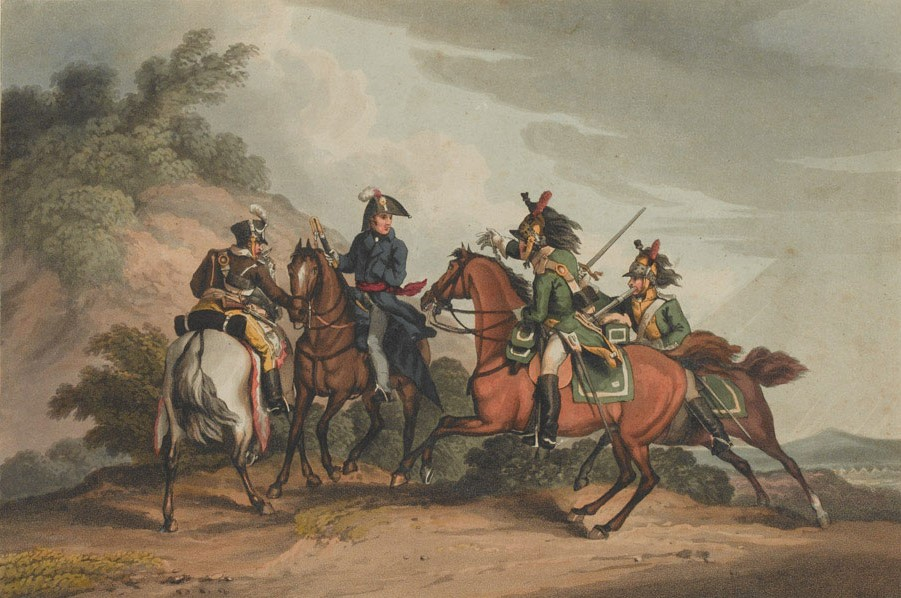
The capture of General Edward Paget by the French, 17 November 1812

He served in the British Army during the Peninsular War commanding the reserve at the Battle of Corunna in 1809 and then conducting the advance to Porto in 1809, during which he lost his right arm. He was second in command under Arthur Wellesley, 1st Duke of Wellington in 1811 and was captured by French cavalry in 1812 and kept a prisoner for two years until the end of the War.

Briefly serving as the Governor of Ceylon in 1822, he was appointed Commander-in-Chief, India, on 13 January 1823 and conducted the Burmese campaigns of 1824 to 1825, relinquishing his role of as Commander-in-Chief on 7 October 1825. He commanded the British troops who suppressed the Barrackpore mutiny of 1824, and although public criticism was muted, he was probably not thought by the governments in India and London to have managed the situation with skill. A scholarly study of the period notes that Paget had little confidence in the Indian army, particularly its native troops. In 1826 he was appointed Governor of the Royal Military College, Sandhurst.

Following the retirement of Rowland Hill, 1st Viscount Hill as Commander-in-Chief of the Forces in 1842, the post was reportedly offered to General Sir Edward Paget; Paget declined the offer, citing poor health as the reason for his refusal. The post was instead re-conferred upon Lord Hill's predecessor, Arthur Wellesley, 1st Duke of Wellington.

=== Member of Parliament ===
Paget was Member of Parliament (MP) for Caernarvon Boroughs from 1796 to 1806, and later as the Member for Milborne Port from 1810 to 1820.

In 1806 his self-described political views centred upon his desire that the United Kingdom should "maintain our navy at its highest establishment and contrive some means of creating a real army of 200,000 men at home and never make peace as long as Europe remains in so complete a state of subjection."

Paget generally voted in support of the government of the day when he sat in Parliament, though he occasionally was recorded as voting in the Parliamentary minority; once in 1803 in support of John Calcraft's proposal for an inquiry into the Prince of Wales' debts, and again in 1812 in support of Henry Grattan's proposal to establish a committee investigating Catholic disabilities.

=== Courtier and honorary appointments ===
In 1798 he served as an Aide-de-camp to King George III.

From 1816 to 1822 he was a Groom of the Bedchamber in the service of George IV, including a period 1816-1820 when the latter was Prince Regent during the mental illness of his father, George III.

Paget was appointment as Governor of Cowes Castle in 1818, and held the post until 1826.

From 1837 until his death he also served as Governor of the Royal Hospital Chelsea; a post which provided a stipend of £1,100 annually.

== Legacy ==
The Memorials to Governors in the Chapel of the Royal Military Academy, Sandhurst includes:

In Memory of General the Honble. Sir Edward Paget, G.C.B., Colonel 28th Foot. Died 13th May, 1849, aged 73 years. His war services are as follows: —Holland, Nimeguen, Gueldermalsen, 1794-5; Cape St. Vincent, 1797 Minorca, 1798; Egypt, three actions, wounded, 1801; Bremen, 1805; Sicily, 1806-7; Sweden and Portugal, 1808; Corunna and Passage of the Douro, lost right arm, 1809; Second-in-Command to Wellington, Retreat from Burgos, taken prisoner, 1812. Commander-in-Chief in India, 1822-25. Governor of this College, 1826-37. Afterwards Governor of Chelsea Hospital.

Parliament of Great Britain
Preceded by Lord Paget	Member of Parliament for Caernarvon Boroughs; 1796–1800	Succeeded by Parliament of the United Kingdom
Parliament of the United Kingdom
Preceded by Parliament of Great Britain	Member of Parliament for Caernarvon Boroughs; 1801–1806	Succeeded by Sir Charles Paget
Government offices
Preceded by Edward Barnes acting governor	Governor of Ceylon; 1822	Succeeded by James Campbell acting governor
Military offices
Preceded by The Marquess of Hastings	Commander-in-Chief, India; 1823–1825	Succeeded by The Viscount Combermere
Preceded by Sir George Murray	Governor of the Royal Military College Sandhurst; 1826–1837	Succeeded by Sir George Scovell
Honorary titles
Preceded by Sir Samuel Hulse	Governor, Royal Hospital Chelsea; 1837–1849	Succeeded by Sir George Anson
