= George Burrell (British Army officer) =

British Army Officer (1777–1853)

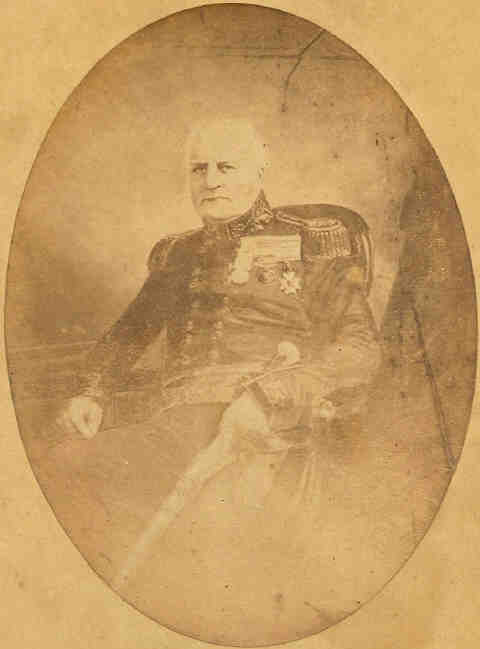
- Born: 26 February 1777; Longhoughton, Northumberland, England
- Died: 4 January 1853 (aged 75); Alnwick, Northumberland, England
- Military career
- Allegiance: United Kingdom
- Branch: British Army
- Rank: Lieutenant-General
- Wars: Napoleonic Wars; War of 1812; First Anglo-Chinese War
- Awards: Companion of the Order of the Bath

Lieutenant-General George Burrell CB (26 February 1777 – 4 January 1853) was a British Army officer. He served in the Napoleonic Wars (1803–1815), War of 1812, and First Anglo-Chinese War (1839-1842).

== Military career ==
Burrell was born in Longhoughton, Northumberland, England, on 26 February 1777. He was the second son of John Burrell, esq. of Longhoughton, and his wife Barbara Peareth of Newcastle. He joined the British Army as an ensign in the 15th (East Riding Yorkshire) Regiment in 1797 and was promoted to lieutenant later that year. In 1805, he joined a company and when on passage to the West Indies, the transport ship in which he was embarked was attacked by a large French privateer schooner, which was beat off with great loss. Burrell became a major in the 90th Light Infantry in 1807, was at the capture of Guadeloupe in 1810, and served during the war in Canada in 1814 and 1815, having commanded the post of Fort-Major during the winter of that year. He proceeded to Europe in 1815, but arrived too late for the Battle of Waterloo. Having marched to Paris, he remained there until the occupying army was formed in December before returning to England in July 1816.

In 1820, Burrell went to the Mediterranean, where he held the civil and military command of Paxo for over five years, one of the Ionian Islands under a British protectorate. For this, he received a highly complimentary token from the regent and from the civil authorities of the island. After becoming a colonel in 1830, he returned to England in 1832 with the 18th (Royal Irish) Regiment. In 1836, he was ordered to Ceylon, where he became commandant at Colombo and Trincomalee. He was promoted to major-general by brevet in the East Indies only on 10 January 1837.

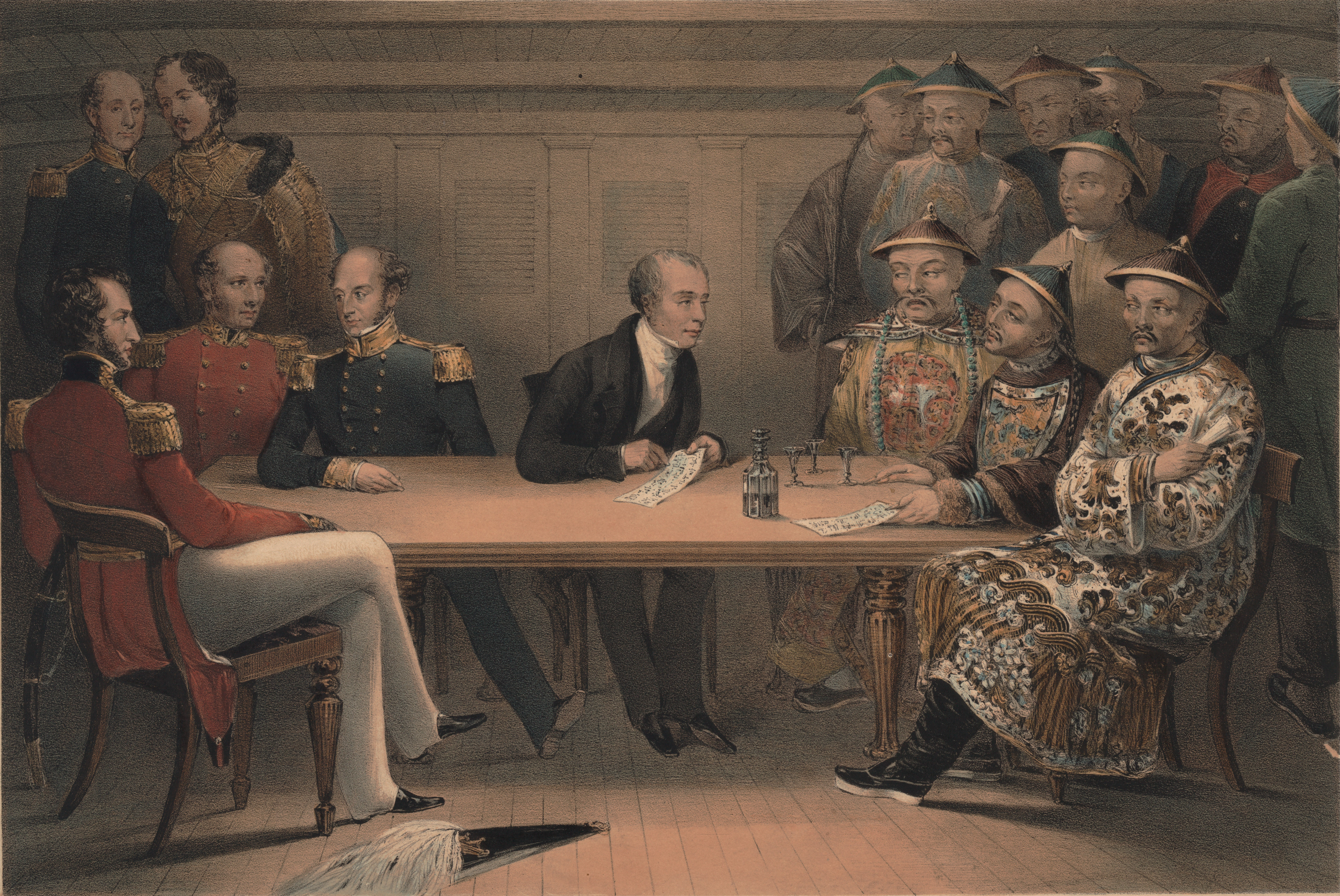
Burrell (seated second from left) on board HMS Wellesley on 4 July 1840, a day before the capture of Chusan

In May 1840, Burrell proceeded to China and commanded the troops in the capture of Chusan in July 1840. The British established a military administration on the island, with himself as governor. Chusan was evacuated and returned to the Chinese in February 1841 after a tentative agreement with Chinese authorities. However, hostilities were renewed after the agreement was not ratified, and he commanded a brigade in the attack on Canton in May 1841. He commanded a brigade until the end of the war in July 1842.

On 14 October 1841, Burrell was appointed a Companion of the Most Honourable Military Order of the Bath. He received the thanks of both Houses of Parliament for his services in China. In 1851, he was promoted to lieutenant-general, and became colonel of the 39th (Dorsetshire) Regiment in February 1852. He died in Alnwick, Northumberland, England, on 4 January 1853.

== Family ==
Burrell married Ann Scott, daughter of Sir John Scott, in 1803. His second marriage was to Marianne Theresa Thomas; they had two sons and two daughters:

- Georgina (1819–1866); married Major Thomas Skinner, Ceylon Rifle Regiment, on 19 December 1838
- Henry Duncan (1821–1848); lieutenant in the 18th Royal Irish; served in China
- Graham (1822–1847); lieutenant in the Royal Artillery; died at sea on his voyage to Ceylon
- Harriet Barbara (1825–1905); married reverend Thomas Gray on 2 November 1849

Military offices
Preceded by Frederick Philipse Robinson	Colonel of the 39th (Dorsetshire) Regiment of Foot; 1852–1853	Succeeded by Richard Lluellyn
