= Kandewela =

- Village
- Location within Sri Lanka
- Country: Sri Lanka
- Province: Central Province
- Time zone: UTC+5:30 (Sri Lanka Standard Time)

Kandewela is a village in Sri Lanka. It is located within Central Province.

The village is located in the Pathahewaheta area of Kandy District, at approximately 7.2165° north latitude and 80.7235° east longitude. It lies about 604 meters above sea level, which gives it a milder climate than the coastal areas of the country. Kandewela is located in Sri Lanka’s Central Province, one of the country’s most important historical and cultural areas. The nearby city of Kandy was the last capital of the Sinhalese Kingdom before British rule.

== See also ==
- List of towns in Central Province, Sri Lanka
