= Edward Barnes (British Army officer) =

British officer

Lieutenant-General Sir Edward Barnes GCB
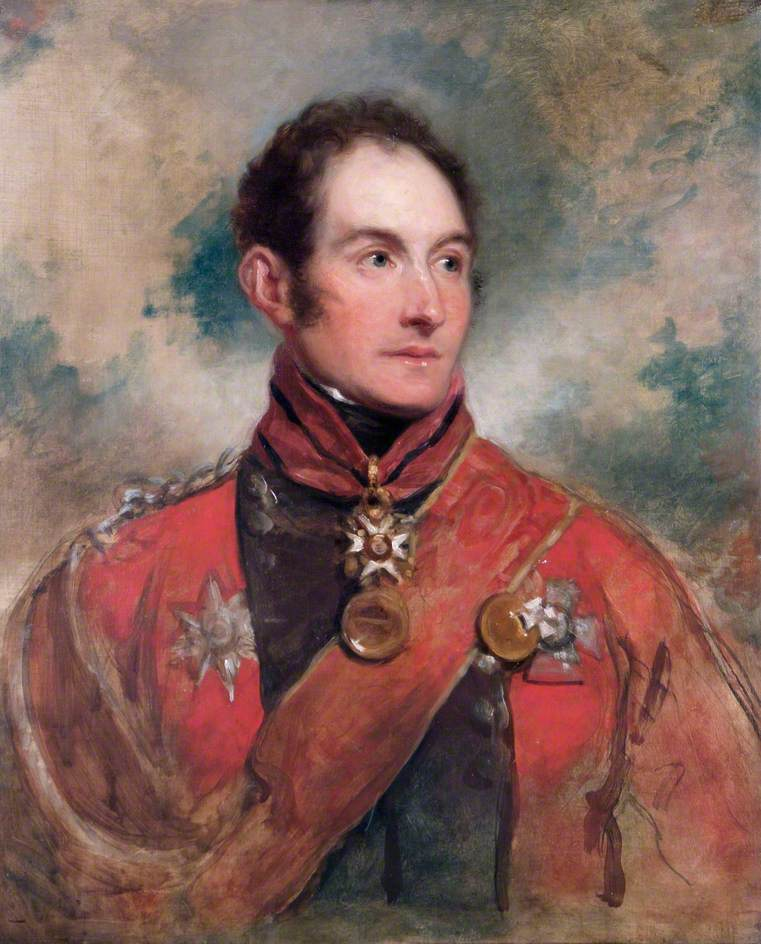
- Barnes in 1818, by George Dawe

5th Governor of British Ceylon
- In office 18 January 1824 – 13 October 1831
- Preceded by: James Campbell (acting)
- Succeeded by: John Wilson (acting)
- Acting; 1 February 1820 – 2 February 1822
- Preceded by: Robert Brownrigg
- Succeeded by: Edward Paget

12th General Officer Commanding, Ceylon
- In office 1820–?
- Preceded by: Alexander Cosby Jackson
- Succeeded by: James Campbell

Personal details
- Born: 28 October 1776
- Died: 19 March 1838 (aged 61) Walthamstow, Essex
- Spouse: Maria Fawkes (m. 1823)
- Children: Maria Anne (1825 – ?); Richard Hawksworth (1831–1904)

Military service
- Allegiance: United Kingdom
- Branch/service: British Army
- Rank: Lieutenant-General
- Commands: General Officer Commanding, Ceylon; Presidency Armies
- Battles/wars: Peninsular War

Lieutenant-General Sir Edward Barnes GCB (28 October 1776 – 19 March 1838) was a British Army officer who served as the governor of British Ceylon.

== Military career ==
Barnes joined the 47th Regiment of Foot in 1792 as an ensign, and quickly rose to field rank. He was promoted to lieutenant-colonel in 1807, serving in the Invasion of Martinique in 1809, and colonel in 1810. Two years later, he served on Wellington's staff in the Peninsular War. His services in this capacity gained him further promotion; as a major-general, he led a brigade in the Battle of Vitoria and took part in the battles the Pyrenees, Nivelle, Nive and Orthez. He was awarded the Gold Cross and three clasps for his Peninsula service. Barnes served in the campaign of 1815 as adjutant-general, and was wounded at the Battle of Waterloo, where he was known as "our fire eating adjutant general". Already a KCB, he was a recipient of the Austrian Order of Maria Theresa 3rd Class, and the Russian Order of St Anne.

In 1808 he was appointed the lieutenant-governor of Dominica serving in the position until 1812, when he was gazetted as lieutenant-governor of Antigua in December 1813, although he did not take up the appointment.

In 1819, his connection with Ceylon began. Lieutenant-General Barnes was appointed acting Governor of Ceylon from 1 February 1820 to 2 February 1822, succeeding Robert Brownrigg. He then served as governor of Ceylon from 18 January 1824 to 13 October 1831, succeeded by Robert Wilmot-Horton (1784–1841, governor 13 to 23 October 1831). He directed the construction of the great military road between Colombo and Kandy, and of many other lines of communication, made the first census of the population, and introduced coffee cultivation based on the West Indian system (1824). In 1831, he received the GCB. From 1832 to 1833, he was commander in-chief in India, with the local rank of general.

On his return home, he was appointed in 1834 Colonel of the 31st (Huntingdonshire) Regiment of Foot, a post he held until his death. The same year he stood for Parliament as Conservative candidate for Sudbury at a by-election. The votes between the two candidates were tied, and the returning officer gave Barnes his casting vote and declared him elected; however, his opponent petitioned against the outcome, denying that the returning officer had the right to a casting vote, and the issue had not been resolved before Parliament was dissolved. At the 1835 general election, Barnes was narrowly defeated, but he finally became MP for Sudbury at the third attempt in 1837; however, he died in the following year.

Along with Admiral William Bowles, Barnes was responsible for the establishment of the Army and Navy Club in Pall Mall, London.

Barnes' portrait was painted, for Ceylon, by John Wood, and a memorial statue was erected in Colombo in front of the President's House, Colombo from which point trunk road mileage was measured in Ceylon.

== Personal life and death ==
Edward Barnes was born on 28 October 1776, the son of John Barnes of Liverpool and Anne née Parke, daughter of John Parke. He married Maria Fawkes (1798–1854), of Farnley Hall, on 31 July 1823 in Otley, Yorkshire; she was the daughter of Walter Ramsden Hawksworth Fawkes and his wife Maria Grimston.

Barnes died on 19 March 1838 at his home in Walthamstow, Essex and is buried in the churchyard of St. Mary's Church, Walthamstow. His gravesite is marked by a large monument, with an inscription giving details of his achievements in life.

== See also ==
- Raj Bhavan, originally known as the Barnes' Court after Edward Barnes

Government offices
Preceded by Robert Brownrigg	Acting; Governor of Ceylon; 1820–1822	Succeeded by Edward Paget
Preceded by James Campbell acting governor	Governor of Ceylon; 1824–1831	Succeeded by John Wilson acting governor
Parliament of the United Kingdom
Preceded by Sir John Benn Walsh, Bt; Michael Angelo Taylor	Member of Parliament for Sudbury; 1834–1835; With: Sir John Benn Walsh, Bt	Succeeded by John Bagshaw; Benjamin Smith
Preceded by John Bagshaw; Benjamin Smith	Member of Parliament for Sudbury; 1837–1838; With: Sir James John Hamilton, Bt 1837; Joseph Bailey 1837–1838	Succeeded by Joseph Bailey; Sir John Benn Walsh, Bt
Military offices
Preceded by Alexander Cosby Jackson	General Officer Commanding, Ceylon; 1820–?	Succeeded by James Campbell
Preceded by The Earl of Dalhousie	Commander-in-Chief, India; 1832–1833	Succeeded by The Lord William Bentinck
