= Robert Brownrigg =

British Army officer and colonial administrator

General Sir Robert Brownrigg GCB Bt
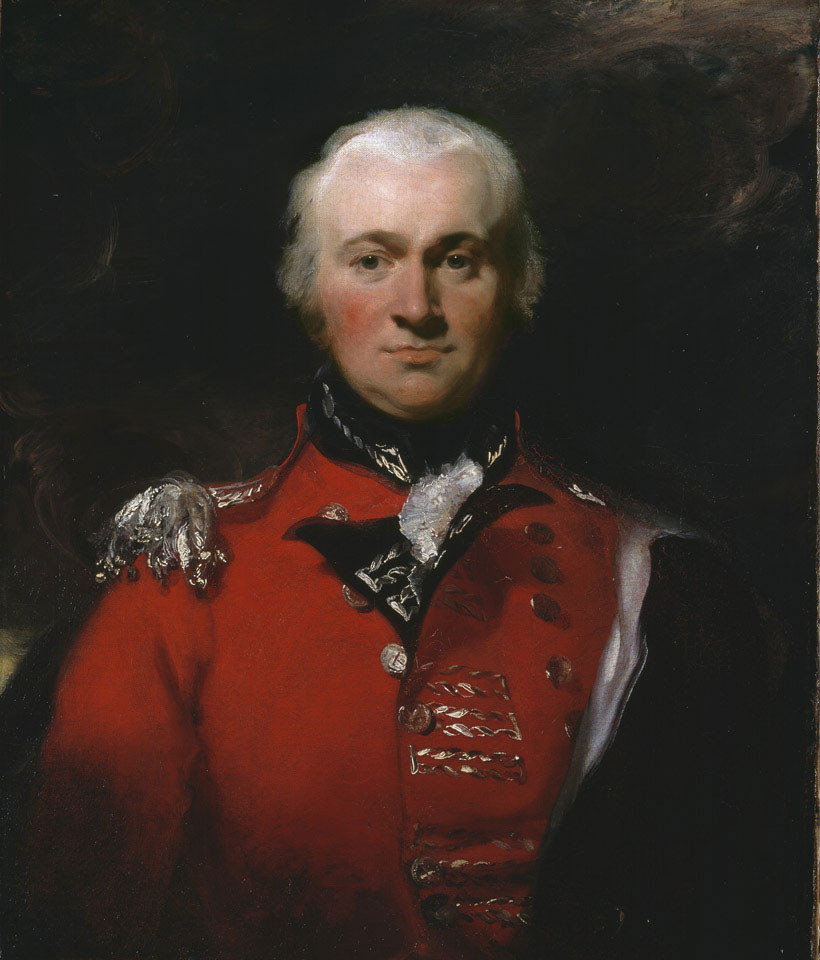
- Portrait by Thomas Lawrence, 1810

3rd Governor of British Ceylon
- In office 11 March 1812 – 1 February 1820
- Preceded by: John Wilson (Acting governor)
- Succeeded by: Edward Barnes (Acting governor)

10th General Officer Commanding, Ceylon
- In office 1812–1812
- Preceded by: John Wilson
- Succeeded by: Alexander Cosby Jackson

Personal details
- Born: 8 February 1758 County Wicklow, Ireland
- Died: 27 April 1833 (aged 75) Monmouth, Monmouthshire, Wales
- Spouse(s): Elizabeth Catharine Lewis (m. 1789; died 1804) Sophia Bissett (m. 1810; died 1833)
- Children: 7

Military service
- Allegiance: Great Britain; United Kingdom
- Branch/service: British Army
- Years of service: 1775–1833
- Rank: General
- Commands: Military Secretary; Quartermaster-General to the Forces; General Officer Commanding, Ceylon; Governor of Landguard Fort
- Battles/wars: French Revolutionary Wars; Flanders Campaign; Anglo-Russian invasion of Holland; Napoleonic Wars; Walcheren Campaign; Great Rebellion of 1817–1818

General Sir Robert Brownrigg, 1st Baronet, GCB (8 February 1758 – 27 April 1833) was a British Army officer and colonial administrator. He brought the last part of Ceylon under British rule.

== Early career ==
Brownrigg was an Anglo-Irishman, he was commissioned as an ensign in 1775. After service with the 9th (East Norfolk) Regiment of Foot, he was appointed Military Secretary to the Duke of York in 1795, and accompanied him to The Helder in Holland in 1799. In 1803 he was appointed Quartermaster-General to the Forces. In 1805 he was made Colonel of the 9th (East Norfolk) Regiment.

== Walcheren campaign ==
July 1809, he joined the expedition to the Schelt. Brownrigg served as chief-of-staff to the commander Lord Chatham during the aborted operation to seize Antwerp that stalled on Walcheren island. On Chatham's instructions he drew up a memorandum assessing the situation for a council of war at which it was decided to abandon the attempt against Antwerp.

== Governor of Ceylon ==
He left his post as Quartermaster-General to the Forces in 1811, and then, in 1813, he was appointed Governor of Ceylon. In 1815, he acquired the Kingdom of Kandy through an agreement with the help of defecting ministers of the Kandyan King, in the central region of the island, and annexed it to the British crown. The treaty was historically known as "Kandyan Convention". In recognition of his achievement, Brownrigg was created a baronet in 1816.

Brownrigg fought the Great Rebellion of 1817–18 and managed to defeat that, aided by reinforcements from India, by enacting martial law. He strengthened his power in the Kandyan Kingdom by issuing a special announcement on 21 November 1818, which contains 56 statements, curtailing the power of aristocrats.

He attained the rank of full General in 1819 and left Ceylon the following year.

The gilded bronze ancient Statue of Tara was reputedly found on the eastern coast of Sri Lanka. It was acquired by Brownrigg, who later donated it to the British Museum when he was living near Monmouth in 1830. This account however is rejected by the authorities in Sri Lanka who believe that Brownrigg took the statue from the last King of Kandy when the British annexed Kandy.

Brownrigg died near Monmouth in 1833.

== Family ==
In 1789, Brownrigg married Elizabeth Catharine Lewis and together they went on to have six sons and a daughter. Then in 1810 he married Sophia Bissett. He had one more child at the age of 69.

== Legacy ==
In 2011, President Mahinda Rajapaksa of Sri Lanka initiated, at the country's Parliament, a formal revocation of Robert Brownrigg's Gazette Notification - under which participants of the Great Rebellion of 1817–18 had been condemned as "traitors" and their properties confiscated. Brownrigg's Gazette Notification was declared null and void, and all those he branded as "traitors" were declared to be National Heroes of Sri Lanka. A National Declaration was awarded on their behalf to their descendants on Republic Day of Sri Lanka, 22 May.

== Arms ==
Coat of arms of Robert Brownrigg
Crest 1st (of augmentation), A Demi-Kandian proper the body vested Argent and belted Or Cap Gold in the dexter hand a Sword and in the sinister a representation of the Kandian Crown also proper; 2nd, A Mural Crown Or thereon a Sword erect entwined by a Serpent Vert. Escutcheon Argent a Lion rampant guardant Sable grasping in the dexter paw a Sword Pommel and Hilt Or thereon a Serpent entwined proper between three Crescents Gules, and as an honourable augmentation (granted by King George IV on 23 Mar 1822) a Chief embattled Vert thereon a representation of the Sceptre of the King of Kandy Or and the Banner of the said king being Gules within a Bordure with a Ray of the Sun issuing from each angle a Lion passant Gold holding a Sword proper in saltire the whole ensigned with a representation of the Crown of the kingdom of Kandy also proper. Motto Virescat Vulnere Virtus (Valour strengthens from a wound)

== Sources ==
- Reiter, Jacqueline. The Late Lord: The Life of John Pitt–2nd Earl of Chatham. Casemate Publishers, 2017.
- Stephens, Henry Morse (1886). "Brownrigg, Robert" . In Stephen, Leslie (ed.). Dictionary of National Biography. Vol. 7. London: Smith, Elder & Co.

Military offices
New post	Military Secretary; 1795–1803	Succeeded by William Clinton
Preceded by Sir David Dundas	Quartermaster-General to the Forces; 1803–1811	Succeeded by Sir James Gordon
Preceded by John Wilson	General Officer Commanding, Ceylon; 1812	Succeeded by Alexander Cosby Jackson
Preceded by Peter Hunter	Colonel of the 9th (East Norfolk) Regiment of Foot; 1804–1833	Succeeded by Sir John Cameron
Government offices
Preceded by John Wilson acting governor	Governor of Ceylon; 1812–1820	Succeeded by Edward Barnes acting governor
Baronetage of the United Kingdom
New creation	Baronet (of London); 1816–1833	Succeeded by Robert Brownrigg
