= James Campbell (British Army officer, died 1835) =

British Army officer and colonial administrator

Major-General Sir James Campbell KCB

Acting Governor of British Ceylon
- In office 6 November 1822 – 18 January 1824
- Monarch: George IV
- Preceded by: Edward Paget
- Succeeded by: Edward Barnes

13th General Officer Commanding, Ceylon
- In office 22 July 1822 – ?
- Preceded by: Edward Barnes
- Succeeded by: Hudson Lowe

Personal details
- Born: c. 1773
- Died: 1835

Military service
- Allegiance: United Kingdom
- Branch/service: British Army
- Rank: Major-General
- Commands: General Officer Commanding, Ceylon

Major-General Sir James Campbell (c. 1773 – 1835) was a British Army officer and colonial administrator.

== Early life ==
He was son of Major-General Dugald Campbell of Auchinleck (1742–1809) and his wife Elizabeth Mackay.

Campbell served from 1803 in the Second Anglo-Maratha War, under Arthur Wellesley.

== Peninsular War ==
The 94th Regiment of Foot in which he served had its troops drafted into other regiments, and Campbell, promoted lieutenant-colonel in 1804, returned to the United Kingdom with the other officers. Stationed in Jersey, the 94th recruited again. It was sent to Portugal in 1810, and was on garrison duty in Lisbon and then Cádiz, Campbell commanding it in a brigade of the 3rd Division under Thomas Picton. From October 1810 it was under Charles Colville, in the field and at the battle of Fuentes de Oñoro in 1811.

From the end of 1811, Colville having taken over the 4th Division, Campbell commanded the 94th, to the end of the Peninsular War. He took command at the Siege of Badajoz (1812) of the 3rd Division, Picton and James Kempt being wounded. He was himself wounded, in command, at the Battle of Salamanca in 1812, and gave up brigade command to Colville in June 1813. He was then seriously wounded at the Battle of Vitoria, commanding the 94th, and returned to England.

== Later life ==
Campbell was acting Governor of British Ceylon, appointed in 1822 and in post until 1824. He was succeeded by Edward Barnes. He was then Governor of Grenada, from 1826 to 1831.

== Family ==
In 1817 Campbell married Lady Louisa Dorothea Cuffe, a younger daughter of Otway Cuffe, 1st Earl of Desart. Their fourth child, James Campbell (1822–1894), worked as an astronomer with Edmund Neville Nevill. Three daughters, Elizabeth Ann Louisa, Charlotte and Emily, survived their father.

Government offices
Preceded by Edward Paget	Acting; Governor of British Ceylon; 1822–1824	Succeeded by Edward Barnes
Military offices
Preceded by Edward Barnes	General Officer Commanding, Ceylon; 1822–?	Succeeded by Hudson Lowe
