= Singhapitiya =

Coordinates: 7°10′N 80°33′E

Singhapitiya is a village located in Central Province, Sri Lanka near the town of Gampola. One of the earliest coffee plantations of Sri Lanka, Mariawatte, was situated nearby Singhapitiya.
