= 1955 New Year Honours =

British royal recognitions

The New Year Honours 1955, were appointments in many of the Commonwealth realms of Queen Elizabeth II to various orders and honours to reward and highlight good works by citizens of those countries. They were announced on 1 January 1955 to celebrate the year passed and mark the beginning of 1955.

The recipients of honours are displayed here as they were styled before their new honour, and arranged by honour, with classes (Knight, Knight Grand Cross, etc.) and then divisions (Military, Civil, etc.) as appropriate.

== United Kingdom and Colonies ==
=== Baron ===
- Edgar Douglas Adrian, OM, President of the Royal Society, President of the British Association, Master of Trinity College, Cambridge.
- Sir William Fraser, CBE, chairman, Anglo-Iranian Oil Company Ltd.
- Sir Arnold Babb Gridley, KBE, MP, Member of Parliament for Stockport, 1935–1950, and for Stockport South since 1950. Chairman, Conservative and Unionist Members' Committee, 1946–1951. For political and public services.

=== Privy Councillor ===
- Evelyn Nigel Chetwode Birch, OBE, MP, Minister of Works since October 1954. Parliamentary Secretary, Ministry of Defence, 1952–1954; Parliamentary Under-Secretary of State for Air, 1951–1952; Member of Parliament for Flintshire, 1945–1950, and for West Flint since 1950.

=== Knight Bachelor ===
- William Gordon Bennett, MP, Member of Parliament for the Woodside Division of Glasgow since 1950. For political and public services.
- David Arnold Scott Cairns, QC, chairman, Monopolies and Restrictive Practices Commission.
- Wilfrid Edward Le Gros Clark, MD, FRCS, Dr. Lee's Professor of Anatomy, University of Oxford.
- William Robert Marshall Cockburn, Chief General Manager, The Chartered Bank of India, Australia and China.
- Arthur Colegate, MP, Member of Parliament for the Wrekin Division, 1941–1945, and for the Burton Division since 1950. For political and public services.
- Ivor Richard Cox, DSO. For services as managing director, Metropolitan Vickers Electrical Co. Ltd.
- William Charles Crocker, MC, lately President of The Law Society.
- Leybourne Stanley Patrick Davidson, MD, FRCP, Professor of Medicine, University of Edinburgh, and President of the Royal College of Physicians of Edinburgh.
- Colonel Charles Vernon Fitton, OBE, MC. For political and public services in the North Riding of Yorkshire.
- Arthur Alexander Gemmell, MC, TD, MD, FRCS, President, Royal College of Obstetricians and Gynaecologists.
- George Frederick Hamer, CBE. For public services in Wales. Lord Lieutenant of Montgomeryshire.
- Basil Lucas Quixano Henriques, CBE, JP. For services to youth welfare.
- Alderman Archer Hoare, CBE. For political and public services in Middlesex.
- Oscar Rudolf Hobson. For services to journalism. City Editor of the News Chronicle.
- Ian Macdonald Horobin, MP, Member of Parliament for Central Southwark, 1931–1935, and for Oldham East since 1951. For political and public services.
- Alderman Harold Walter Seymour Howard, Lord Mayor of London.
- Ronald Martin Howe, CVO, MC, Deputy Commissioner, Metropolitan Police Force.
- Colonel Francis James Gidlow Jackson, MC, TD. For political and public services in Manchester and Cheshire.
- Norris Vaughan Kenyon, JP. For political and public services in Paddington.
- Charles Stuart McFarlane, OBE. For political services in Scotland.
- Robert Reynolds Macintosh, FRCS, Nuffield Professor of Anaesthetics, University of Oxford.
- Robert Alexander Maclean. For services to industry in Scotland.
- John Mann, CBE, JP, DL, Convenor, Lanarkshire County Council.
- Brigadier Frank Medlicott, CBE, MP, Member of Parliament for East Norfolk, 1939–1950, and for Central Norfolk since 1950. For political and public services.
- Philip Eric Millbourn, CMG, Honorary Adviser on Shipping in Port to the Minister of Transport and Civil Aviation.
- Keith Anderson Hope Murray, chairman, University Grants Committee.
- John Ernest Neale, Astor Professor of English History, University of London.
- Wilfred John Neden, CB, CBE, Chief Industrial Commissioner, Ministry of Labour and National Service.
- Arthur Cyril Richmond, CBE, Chairman of the Land Settlement Association and of the Federation of Agricultural Co-operatives in Great Britain and Ireland.
- Alfred Roberts, CBE, JP, General Secretary, National Association of Card, Blowing and Ring Room Operatives.
- Sydney Gordon Russell, CBE, MC, Designer and Artist.
- Robert Donald Scott, MP, Member of Parliament for the Wansbeck Division, 1940–1945, and for Penrith and the Border since 1950. Joint Parliamentary Secretary, Ministry of Agriculture and Fisheries, May–July 1945. For political and public services.
- Leonard Sinclair, chairman and managing director, Esso Petroleum Co. Ltd.
- Rear-Admiral Matthew Sausse Slattery, CB, (Retired), chairman and managing director, Short Brothers & Harland Ltd., Belfast.
- Henry Spurrier, managing director, Leyland Motors Ltd.
- Oliver Graham Sutton, CBE, Director of the Meteorological Office, Air Ministry.
- Walter Wharton Tong. For political and public services in Bolton.
- Colonel George Albert Wade, MC, JP. For political and public services in Staffordshire.
- Robert Bernard Waterer, CB, Solicitor to the Board of Inland Revenue.
- Thomas Adam Wedderspoon. For political and public services in Angus.

State of South Australia

- Edgar Layton Bean, CMG, Parliamentary Draftsman, State of South Australia.
- The Honourable Frank Tennyson Perry, MBE, a Member of the Legislative Council, State of South Australia. For public services.

Federation of Rhodesia and Nyasaland

- Thomas Sidney Chegwidden, CB, CVO, Chairman of the Interim Public Service Commission, Federation of Rhodesia and Nyasaland. For public services.

Commonwealth Services

- James Greig Shearer, Indian Civil Service (Retired), formerly a Puisne Judge of the High Court of Judicature at Patna.

Colonies, Protectorates, Etc.

- Nicholas Bayard Dill, CBE. For public services in Bermuda.
- Joseph Trounsell Gilbert, CBE, QC, Chief Justice, Bermuda.
- Eric Hallinan, Chief Justice, Cyprus.
- Eldred Frederick Hitchcock. CBE. For public services in Tanganyika.
- Kobina Arku Korsah, CBE, Puisne Judge, Gold Coast.
- Paul George Pavlides, CBE. For public services in Cyprus.

=== Order of the Bath ===
==== Knight Grand Cross of the Order of the Bath (GCB) ====
Military Division

- Air Chief Marshal Sir Arthur Penrose Martyn Sanders, KCB, KBE, ADC, Royal Air Force.

Civil Division

- Sir John Primatt Redcliffe Maud, KCB, CBE, Permanent Secretary, Ministry of Fuel and Power.

==== Knight Commander of the Order of the Bath (KCB) ====
Military Division

Royal Navy

- Vice-Admiral Sir John Arthur Symons Eccles, KCVO, CB, CBE.
- Vice-Admiral (E) Frank Trowbridge Mason, CB.

Army

- Lieutenant-General Sir Lashmer Gordon Whistler, KBE, CB, DSO, (13017), late Infantry (Colonel, The Royal Sussex Regiment).
- Major-General Sir Thomas John Willoughby Winterton, KCMG, CB, CBE, (5778), late Infantry.

Royal Air Force

- Air Marshal Sir Harry Broadhurst, KBE, CB, DSO, DFC, AFC.

Civil Division

- Lieutenant-Colonel the Right Honourable Sir Michael Edward Adeane, KCVO, CB, Private Secretary to The Queen.
- Sir Herbert Brittain, KBE, CB, Second Secretary, HM Treasury.
- Edward Abdy Fellowes, CB, CMG, MC, Clerk of the House of Commons.

==== Companion of the Order of the Bath (CB) ====
Military Division

Royal Navy

- Rear-Admiral William Leslie Graham Adams, OBE.
- Rear-Admiral Hilary Worthington Biggs, DSO.
- Rear-Admiral (E) John Garnett Cranston Given, CBE.
- Surgeon Rear-Admiral James Hamilton, CBE, MB, ChB.
- Rear-Admiral Clarence Dinsmore Howard-Johnston, DSO, DSC.
- Rear-Admiral (S) Alan Watson Laybourne, CBE.
- Major-General Cecil Farndale Phillips, CBE, DSO, Royal Marines.
- Rear-Admiral Ballin Illingworth Robertshaw, CBE.
- Rear-Admiral Malcolm Walter St Leger Searle, CBE.
- Rear-Admiral (E) Philip Cardwell Taylor.

Army

- Brigadier (temporary) Geoffrey Harding Baker, CBE, MC, (50806), late Royal Regiment of Artillery.
- Major-General George Edward Restalic Bastin, OBE, (26948), late Royal Regiment of Artillery.
- Major-General Denys Herbert Vintcent Buckle, CBE, (27504), late Royal Army Service Corps.
- Major-General Cyril Harry Colquhoun, OBE, (26956), late Royal Regiment of Artillery.
- Brigadier (temporary) Robert Burrell Frederick Kinglake Goldsmith, CBE, (38857), late Infantry.
- Major-General Charles William Greenway, CBE, QHS, MRCS, LRCP, (27885), late Royal Army Medical Corps.
- Major-General James Newton Rodney Moore, CBE, DSO, (32071), late Foot Guards.
- Major-General Francis David Rome, CBE, DSO, (33750), late Infantry.
- Brigadier Robert John Springhall, OBE, (18004), late Infantry (now R.A.R.O.).
- Major-General Leslie Norman Tyler, OBE, (38480), Corps of Royal Electrical and Mechanical Engineers.

Royal Air Force

- Air Vice-Marshal Cecil Leonard Morley Brown, OBE.
- Air Vice-Marshal Walter Graemes Cheshire, CBE.
- Air Vice-Marshal Arthur Francis Hutton, CBE, DFC.
- Acting Air Vice-Marshal Leonard Thomas Pankhurst, CBE.
- Air Commodore Charles George Lott, CBE, DSO, DFC.
- Air Commodore Walter Charles Sheen, DSO, OBE.
- Acting Air Commodore Donald Randell Evans, CBE, DFC.

Civil Division

- William Denis Allen, CMG, Assistant Under-Secretary of State, Foreign Office.
- Kenneth Anderson, CBE, Deputy Director-General and Comptroller and Accountant General, General Post Office.
- William Herbert Cornish, Assistant Under-Secretary of State, Home Office.
- Brigadier Harold Powell Crosland, CBE, MC, TD, DL, chairman, Berkshire Territorial and Auxiliary Forces Association.
- John Mathew Dick, CBE, VRD, Solicitor to the Secretary of State for Scotland.
- Brigadier Sydney Thomas Divers, CBE, DSO, TD, Controller, Central Office, Newcastle, Ministry of Pensions and National Insurance.
- George Robert Disraeli Hogg, CBE, Under-Secretary, Department of Scientific and Industrial Research.
- William Rankin McGaw, Director General of Aircraft Production, Ministry of Supply.
- The Honourable Walter Symington Maclay, OBE, MD, FRCP, Senior Medical Commissioner, Ministry of Health and Board of Control.
- Sydney William Charles Phillips, Under-Secretary, Ministry of Housing and Local Government.
- Reginald Joseph William Stacy, Under-Secretary, Board of Trade.
- Burke St. John Trend, CVO, Under-Secretary, HM Treasury.
- Colonel Francis William Watson, MC, TD, DL, lately chairman, County of Buckingham Territorial and Auxiliary Forces Association.
- Maurice Gordon Whittome, Solicitor, Board of Customs and Excise.
- Percy Wilson, HM Inspector of Schools (Chief Inspector), Ministry of Education.

=== Order of Saint Michael and Saint George ===
==== Knight Grand Cross of the Order of St Michael and St George (GCMG) ====
- His Highness The Right Honourable Aga Sultan Sir Mahomed Shah, Aga Khan, GCSI, GCIE, GCVO.
- The Honourable Sir Evelyn Baring, KCMG, KCVO, Governor and Commander-in-Chief, Kenya.
- Sir Roger Mellor Makins, KCB, KCMG, Her Majesty's Ambassador Extraordinary and Plenipotentiary in Washington.

==== Knight Commander of the Order of St Michael and St George (KCMG) ====
- The Honourable Geoffrey Cokayne Gibbs, CMG, Chairman of the Advisory Council, Export Credits Guarantee Department.
- Admiral Sir Martin Eric Dunbar-Nasmith, VC, KCB, DL, (Retired), lately vice-chairman, Imperial War Graves Commission.
- The Right Honourable Sir Ronald Hibbert Cross, Bt., KCVO, Governor of the State of Tasmania.
- Lieutenant-General Sir John Dudley Lavarack, KCVO, KBE, CB, CMG, DSO, Governor of the State of Queensland.
- The Honourable Sir Robert Clarkson Tredgold, CMG, Chief Justice of Southern Rhodesia; and Acting Governor of the Colony on several occasions.
- Edward Betham Beetham, CMG, CVO, OBE, Governor and Commander-in-Chief, Windward Islands.
- The Right Honourable Thomas Daniel, Earl of Ranfurly, Governor and Commander-in-Chief, Bahamas.
- Patrick Muir Renison, CMG, Governor and Commander-in-Chief, British Honduras.
- Sir Bryan Evers Sharwood-Smith, KBE, CMG, ED, Governor, Northern Region, Nigeria.
- The Honourable Robert Maurice Alers Hankey, CMG, Her Majesty's Ambassador Extraordinary and Plenipotentiary in Stockholm.
- Geoffrey Wedgwood Harrison, CMG, An Assistant Under-Secretary of State in the Foreign Office.
- Reginald Keith Jopson, CMG, OBE, Her Majesty's Ambassador Extraordinary and Plenipotentiary in Bogota.
- Charles Norman Stirling, CMG, Her Majesty's Ambassador Extraordinary and Plenipotentiary (designate) in Lisbon.

==== Companion of the Order of St Michael and St George (CMG) ====
- Norman Cecil Sommers Down, Senior Principal Inspector of Taxes, Board of Inland Revenue.
- Robert Clark McCall, assistant director of Television Broadcasting, British Broadcasting Corporation.
- Gerald John MacMahon, Senior Trade Commissioner and Economic Adviser to the United Kingdom High Commissioner in India.
- John Ivo Cecil May, OBE, Director, Empire Cotton Growing Corporation.
- Frederic Milner, HM Treasury Representative in the Middle East.
- Bellamy Alexander Cash-Reed, Attaché for Food and Agriculture at Her Majesty's Embassy in Washington.
- Edward Walters Senior, Commercial Director, British Iron and Steel Federation.
- William Forbes Mackenzie, CBE, Resident Commissioner, Bechuanaland Protectorate.
- David Mowbray Balme, DSO, DFC, Principal, University College, Gold Coast.
- John Sloman Bennett, Assistant Secretary, Colonial Office.
- Theodore Louis Bowring, OBE, Director of Public Works, Hong Kong.
- Henry Vernon Cusack, CBE, deputy director, Oversea Audit Service.
- Colville Montgomery Deverell, CVO, OBE, Colonial Secretary, Jamaica.
- Maurice Henry Dorman, Colonial Secretary, Trinidad.
- John Frederick Rowland Hill, Member for Communications, Works and Development Planning, Tanganyika.
- Frank Wilfred Holder, QC, Attorney-General, British Guiana.
- Raymond Lewthwaite, OBE, DM, BCh, Director of Colonial Medical Research.
- John Gurney Mackenzie, chairman, Public Service Commission, Eastern Region, Nigeria.
- Roy James Philip McLaughlan, Inspector-General, Nigeria Police Force.
- Robert John Minnitt, Chief Secretary, Western Pacific High Commission.
- Edward James Petrie, Secretary to the Treasury, Kenya.
- Alhaji Muhammadu Sanusi, Emir of Kano, Northern Region, Nigeria.
- Thomas Murray Shankland, Deputy Governor, Western Region, Nigeria.
- Geoffrey Ellrington Fane Smith, Senior Provincial Commissioner, Northern Rhodesia.
- William Frederick Stubbs, CBE, Secretary for Native Affairs, Northern Rhodesia.
- Kenneth Cecil Tours, Economic Adviser, Gold Coast.
- Robert Noel Turner, Colonial Secretary, Barbados.
- Alexander Nicol Anton Waddell, DSC, Colonial Secretary, Gambia.
- Thomas Yirrell Watson, MBE, Secretary for Agriculture and Natural Resources, Uganda.
- Marcus John Cheke, CVO, Her Majesty's Vice-Marshal of the Diplomatic Corps.
- Robert Spencer Isaacson, Counsellor (Commercial) at Her Majesty's Embassy in Washington.
- Roger William Jackling, Economic and Financial Adviser, Control Commission for Germany (British Element).
- Brigadier Geoffrey Alex Colin Macnab, CB, lately Military Attaché at Her Majesty's Embassy in Paris.
- Robert Hugh Kirk Marett, OBE, Foreign Office.
- Francis Victor Michell, Foreign Office.
- Edward Humphrey Nightingale, Governor of Equatoria Province, Sudan.
- Donald Victor Staines, CBE, Foreign Office.
- Andrew Charles Stewart, OBE, Her Majesty's Envoy Extraordinary and Minister Plenipotentiary to Korea.
- Francis Aimé Vallat, Deputy Legal Adviser to the Foreign Office.
- Edward Redston Warner, OBE, Foreign Office.
- Thomas Wikeley, OBE, Her Majesty's Consul-General in Jerusalem.
- Brigadier Arthur Blackburn, VC, CBE, Commissioner of the Commonwealth Court of Conciliation and Arbitration, Australia

Honorary Companion

- Raja Haji Kamarulzaman ibni Raja Mansur, OBE, Raja Di-Hilir, Perak, Federation of Malaya.

=== Royal Victorian Order ===
==== Knight Commander of the Royal Victorian Order (KCVO) ====
- The Right Reverend Eric Knightly Chetwode Hamilton.
- Sir Gerald Festus Kelly.

==== Commander of the Royal Victorian Order (CVO) ====
- Captain James Stephen Dalglish, Royal Navy.
- Albert Norman Harrison, OBE.
- Joseph Graeme Humble, MRCS, LRCP.
- Captain Arthur Cecil Jocelyn.
- Alan McLeod, FDS, RCS.
- Kenneth Roy Eldin Taylor.

==== Member of the Royal Victorian Order (MVO) ====
At this time the two lowest classes of the Royal Victorian Order were "Member (fourth class)" and "Member (fifth class)", both with post-nominal letters MVO. "Member (fourth class)" was renamed "Lieutenant" (LVO) from the 1985 New Year Honours onwards.

Fourth Class

- Thomas Henry Glasse, MBE.
- Charles David Heriot.
- Dorothy Meynell.
- William James Phillips.
- Captain The Right Honourable Patrick Terence William Span, Baron Plunket, Irish Guards.
- Colonel William Quincey Roberts, DSO, OBE, TD.

Fifth Class

- Philip Graham Bell.
- William Frederick Stewart Moran.
- Persis Agnes Lucas Scott.
- Lieutenant-Commander Reginald Woodford, Royal Navy (Retired).
- William Charles Wright.

=== Order of the British Empire ===
==== Knight Grand Cross of the Order of the British Empire (GBE) ====
Military Division

- Admiral Sir Geoffrey Nigel Oliver, KCB, DSO.

Civil Division

- The Right Honourable Oliver Sylvain Baliol, Viscount Esher, MBE. For services to the Arts.
- Sir John Monro Troutbeck, KCMG, OBE, lately Her Majesty's Ambassador Extraordinary and Plenipotentiary in Bagdad.

==== Dame Commander of the Order of the British Empire (DBE) ====
Military Division

- Air Commandant Roberta Mary Whyte, RRC, QHNS, Princess Mary's Royal Air Force Nursing Service.
- Air Commandant Nancy Marion Salmon, OBE, ADC, Women's Royal Air Force.

Civil Division

- Elizabeth Cockayne, Chief Nursing Officer, Ministry of Health.
- The Right Honourable Eva Isabel Marian, Countess of Rosebery. For public services in Scotland.

==== Knight Commander of the Order of the British Empire (KBE) ====
Military Division

Royal Navy

- Vice-Admiral John Felgate Stevens, CB, CBE.
- Instructor Rear-Admiral William Alfred Bishop, CB, OBE.

Army

- Lieutenant-General Edwin Otway Herbert, CB, CBE, DSO, (18477), late Royal Regiment of Artillery.
- Major-General Reginald Laurence Scoones, CB, DSO, OBE, (490), late Royal Armoured Corps.

Royal Air Force

- Acting Air Marshal Leslie Gordon Harvey, CB.

Civil Division

- Colonel Ralph Stephenson Clarke, TD, DL, MP, Member of Parliament for East Grinstead since 1936. For political and public services.
- Sir (Arthur) Wilfrid Garrett, chairman, Industrial Injuries Advisory Council.
- Laurence Norman Helsby, CB, First Commissioner, Civil Service Commission.
- Owen Haddon Wansbrough-Jones, CB, OBE, Chief Scientist, Ministry of Supply.
- Eric Seal, CB, Deputy Secretary, Ministry of Works.
- Sir John Sebastian Bach Stopford, MBE, MD, FRCP, Vice-Chancellor, University of Manchester.
- John Carmichael, Permanent Under-Secretary, Ministry of Finance, Sudan Government.
- Christopher Henry Summerhayes, CMG, MBE, Her Majesty's Ambassador Extraordinary and Plenipotentiary in Katmandu.
- His Highness Sultan Ali bin Abdul al-Karim, Sultan of Lahej, Western Aden Protectorate.
- Sir Robert Ho Tung. For public services in Hong Kong.

==== Commander of the Order of the British Empire (CBE) ====
Military Division

Royal Navy

- Colonel Mervyn Archdall, ADC, Royal Marines.
- Surgeon Captain John Henry Breuell Crosbie, MB, BCh, (Retired).
- Captain Harold Pitcairn Henderson, DSO, (Retired).
- Captain Ian Frederick Montague Newnham. (On loan to the Indian Navy.)
- The Reverend Owen Roebuck, OBE, QHC, Chaplain.
- Captain (S) Victor Evelyn Rusby, OBE, ADC.

Army

- Brigadier (temporary) Geoffrey Ernest Butler (47699), Corps of Royal Electrical and Mechanical Engineers.
- Brigadier (temporary) Laurence Francis de Vic Carey (27904), late Corps of Royal Engineers.
- Brigadier (temporary) James Norman Carter, OBE, (34655), late Infantry.
- Colonel (temporary) Eric Percy Dickson (30522), Corps of Royal Engineers.
- Brigadier Alec Wilson Drew, OBE, (17200), late Royal Regiment of Artillery.
- Colonel (acting) George Edward Gibson Grant Forman, TD, (47876), Army Cadet Force.
- Brigadier Arthur Nicholas Gosselin, DSO, OBE, (6521), late Infantry (now retired).
- Colonel (temporary) Henry Grattan (26968), Corps of Royal Engineers.
- Brigadier (temporary) William Stuart King, OBE, (34469), late Royal Regiment of Artillery.
- Brigadier Kenneth Mackay, DSO, OBE, (22028), late Corps of Royal Engineers.
- Colonel David Meynell, OBE, (41236), late Infantry.
- Colonel (temporary) Hugh Landale Prentis (44165), Royal Army Ordnance Corps.
- Major-General Frederick Cavendish Hilton-Sergeant, QHP, MB, (26337), late Royal Army Medical Corps.
- Colonel (acting) Henry Ernest Cubitt-Smith, DSO, OBE, North Sector, Norfolk Home Guard.
- Brigadier (temporary) Philip John Denton Toosey, DSO, OBE, TD, (38862), late Royal Regiment of Artillery, Territorial Army.
- The Reverend James Alexander Williamson, QHC, MA, Chaplain to the Forces, First Class (44269), Royal Army Chaplains' Department.

Royal Air Force

- Air Commodore Morton Swan Shapcott.
- Air Commodore Allen Henry Wheeler, OBE.
- Acting Air Commodore Michael Harington Dwyer.
- Group Captain John Barrett Altham.
- Group Captain Arthur Llewellyn Derry, OBE.
- Group Captain Antony Greville Dudgeon, DFC.
- Group Captain Arthur Lawrence Holland.
- The Right Reverend Monsignor Patrick Joseph O'Connell.
- Group Captain John Dudley Taylor Revell.
- Group Captain John Marlow Thompson, DSO, DFC, AFC.
- Group Captain Charles Turl, OBE, DSM.

Civil Division

- Conel Hugh O'Donel Alexander, OBE, Foreign Office.
- Arthur Frederic Alford, MB, ChB, Senior Medical Officer, Ministry of Education.
- Alfred Ernest Amor, chairman, Hendon and Harrow Local Employment Committee.
- William Henry Ansell, MC, Deputy Commissioner, War Damage Commission. Vice-chairman of the National Buildings Record Council.
- Dudley Fitz-Mowbray Appleby. For political and public services in Newcastle upon Tyne.
- Reginald Pridham Baulkwill, OBE, Assistant Public Trustee.
- Risdon Archibald Beazley, chairman and managing director, Risdon Beazley Ltd., Southampton.
- Frederick George Charles Bentley, Assistant Secretary, Ordnance Survey Department.
- Hilda Elizabeth Blattner, OBE, Assistant Secretary and Assistant Editor of Publications, Commonwealth Parliamentary Association.
- David Blee, Chief of Commercial Services, British Transport Commission.
- Alderman William Charles Bonney. For political and public services in London.
- Reginald Livingstone Bradley, MC, Director of Borstal Administration, Prison Commission for England and Wales.
- Aynsley Vernon Bridgland, chairman, Legenland Property Co. Ltd. For services in the preservation of the Temple of Mithras.
- Charles Sidney Bryant, lately Director of Materials and Explosives Research and Development, Ministry of Supply.
- Joseph Bulman, lately Chairman of the Executive Council, Urban District Councils Association.
- Francis Clive Savill Carey, lately Professor of Singing and Director of the Opera School, Royal College of Music.
- Alderman Wilfrid Rendel Myson Chambers, OBE, JP, chairman, Middlesex Civil Defence Committee.
- Lewis Chapman, managing director, William Jessop & Sons Ltd., Sheffield.
- Robert William Chapman, Author.
- William Oswald Chatterton, Deputy Accountant General, Ministry of Health.
- George Elgie Christ. For political services.
- John Cosmo Clark, MC, Director of the Rural Industries Bureau.
- Joseph Clitherow, OBE, Chief Officer, Lancashire Fire Brigade.
- David Kemp Colledge, JP, chairman of the Board of Governors, Scottish Woollen Technical College, Galashiels.
- William Cox, OBE, Deputy Controller, HM Stationery Office.
- The Right Honourable John David, Earl of Cranbrook, DL, chairman, East Anglian Regional Hospital Board.
- Leslie William Crawford, Assistant Secretary, Ministry of Food.
- Robert Crichton. For political and public services in Scotland.
- Isaac William Cumberbatch, OBE, chairman, West Midlands Division, National Coal Board.
- William Herbert Currie, OBE, Finance Officer, Home Office.
- Alun Bennett Oldfield-Davies, Controller, Wales, British Broadcasting Corporation.
- Evelyn Sherbrooke Durand, JP. For political and public services in Gloucestershire.
- Gordon Edwards, Assistant Secretary, Ministry of Pensions and National Insurance.
- Edward Cassleton Elliott, chairman, Interdepartmental Committee on the Distribution of Remuneration of General Practitioners.
- Colin Dare Bernard Ellis, MC, lately President, National Association of Corn and Agricultural Merchants.
- John Ernest Finney, Vice-chairman, Moygashel Ltd., Dungannon, County Tyrone.
- Richard Michael Fraser, MBE. For political services.
- Alderman John Newton Frears, chairman and managing director, Frears & Blacks Ltd., Leicester.
- Cyril John Gadd, Keeper, Department of Egyptian and Assyrian Antiquities, British Museum.
- William Gairns, OBE, Accountant-General, Ministry of Supply.
- Eric Holdom Gardener, chairman, Central Horticultural Committee, National Farmers' Union.
- Francis Steward Gentle, chairman and managing director of the White City Stadium and Harringay Arena. For services to sport.
- Allan Stewart Gilbert, Assistant Secretary, Board of Trade.
- Maurice Walter Goldblatt, MD, Director, Industrial Hygiene Research Laboratories, Imperial Chemical Industries Ltd.
- John Leonard Gray, Assistant Secretary, Ministry of Supply.
- Alan William Greenwood, Director, Poultry Research Centre, Edinburgh, Agricultural Research Council.
- Nancy Procter-Gregg, Assistant Secretary, Ministry of Transport and Civil Aviation.
- William Francis Grimes, Director, London Museum.
- William Hall, Inspector-General of Waterguard, Board of Customs and Excise.
- Frederick William Halliwell, President of the Gauge and Tool Makers' Association.
- Harold James Hamblen. For services to the Home Office.
- John Hancock, Assistant Secretary, Admiralty.
- Colonel William Francis Henn, MVO, Chief Constable, Gloucestershire Constabulary.
- Edward Joseph Hinge, Member of the Cinematograph Films Council.
- Harold William Hobbs, Director of Ordnance Factories, Mottingham, Ministry of Supply.
- Frederick John Cleverdon Honey, Secretary, British Employers' Confederation.
- Alfred William Hurll, Chief Executive Commissioner, Boy Scouts Association.
- Horace Ernest Jackson, lately President, British Non-Ferrous Metals Federation.
- David James, JP, chairman, Cardiganshire Agricultural Executive Committee.
- Dorothy Johnson, Deputy Chief Inspector of Factories, Ministry of Labour and National Service.
- Edward Wickerson Jones, OBE, Director of Accounts, Board of Trade.
- Stuart Grace Kermack, Sheriff Substitute of Lanarkshire.
- William Edward Carr Lazenby, lately Member of the Industrial Court.
- Kathleen Lovibond, OBE, JP. For political and public services in Middlesex.
- Herbert Edgar Lunn, County Surveyor, East Sussex County Council.
- James McBoyle, County Clerk, Midlothian.
- Thomas McCrea, MC, lately Assistant Secretary, Ministry of Finance, Northern Ireland.
- George Shipley McIntire, OBE, Town Clerk, Sunderland County Borough Council.
- Arthur Johnston McIntosh, OBE, Chief Constable, Dunbartonshire Constabulary.
- John Joseph McIntyre, OBE, Secretary, Rural District Councils Association.
- Neil Cameron Macnamara, chairman and managing director, Trollope & Colls Ltd., London.
- Juanita Mary Maton, Chief Statistician, Board of Trade.
- Cecil Thomas Melling, chairman, Eastern Electricity Board.
- Robert Muckle, chairman, Board of Governors, United Newcastle upon Tyne Hospitals.
- Colonel James Walter Munn, OBE, Foreign Office.
- Alan Noble, JP. For political and public services in Lancashire.
- Victor Norrie, JP. For political and public services in Scotland.
- Elsa Rose Harriette Nunn, Principal, Diocesan Training College, Fishponds, Bristol.
- George Ormiston, Superintendent Engineer, New Zealand Shipping Company Ltd., and Federal Steam Navigation Co. Ltd.
- Alfred Henry Parker, assistant director of Dockyards, Admiralty.
- Victor Alexander Patterson, JP, Deputy Chairman and managing director, J. & E. Hall Ltd., Dartford.
- Professor Robert Peers, OBE, MC, chairman, Central Committee for Adult Education in HM Forces.
- Benjamin Pickup, JP, lately President, Manchester Chamber of Commerce.
- Harry Stuart Goodhart-Rendel, Writer on architectural subjects.
- Leonard Norton Roddis, Assistant Chief Valuer, Board of Inland Revenue.
- Frederick Stratten Russell, DSC, DFC, Secretary, Marine Biological Association of the United Kingdom, and Director of the Plymouth Laboratory.
- Louis Francis Salzman, Medieval Historian.
- Christine Mary Sheldon, lately Headmistress, Benenden Girls' School.
- Joseph Harold Sheldon, MD, FRCP, Director of Medicine and Senior Physician, Royal Hospital, Wolverhampton.
- Eric Earle Shipton, Explorer and mountaineer.
- David Aitken Shirlaw, Director of Administration and Accounts, Atomic Energy Authority.
- William Sinclair, JP. For political and public services in Glasgow.
- Charles Holt Smith, Professor of Instrument Technology, Royal Military College of Science.
- William Alexander Dey Furley Smith, Assistant Secretary, General Post Office.
- Harold Thomas Speirs, Director of Accounts, Ministry of Pensions and National Insurance.
- John Young Sutherland, Assistant Secretary, Department of Health for Scotland.
- Ernest Leonard Taylor, DVSc, MRCVS, deputy director, Veterinary Laboratories, Ministry of Agriculture and Fisheries.
- George Frederick James Temple, Sedleian Professor of Natural Philosophy, University of Oxford.
- Charles Stephen Toseland, MBE, Under-Secretary, Board of Trade.
- Benjamin Garnet Lampard-Vachell, JP, chairman, Devon County Education Committee.
- Group Captain John Bartholomew Veal, AFC, Director, Aviation Safety and Licensing, Ministry of Transport and Civil Aviation.
- William Veitch, JP, Editor-in-Chief and managing director, Aberdeen Journals Ltd.
- Millicent Anne Warde. For political and public services in Kent.
- Charles Frederick Waters, Assistant Secretary, Ministry of Labour and National Service.
- Alfred Watson, Chief Mechanical and Electrical Engineer, Air Ministry.
- George Stanley Wells, MC, Deputy Chief Engineer, Ministry of Housing and Local Government.
- Major Francis Reginald Beaman Whitehouse, MBE, chairman and managing director, Chad Valley Co. Ltd., Birmingham.
- Benjamin Allen Williams, OBE, chairman, Chester Local Savings Committee.
- Denis John Williams, MD, FRCP, Civilian Consultant to the Royal Air Force in Neurology and Electro-Encephalography.
- William James Wright, JP. For services to Agriculture in Scotland.
- Gawain Westray Bell, MBE, lately Permanent Under-Secretary, Ministry of the Interior, Sudan Government.
- Walter Jesse Wharton Cheesman, MC, lately Co-operative Adviser, Development Division, British Middle East Office, Beirut.
- Ellis Joseph Hayim, British subject lately resident in China.
- Captain John Alfred Stewart Jackson, OBE, Headmaster of the Grange School, Santiago.
- Harry Jones, OBE, Counsellor at Her Majesty's Embassy in Washington.
- Howard Campbell McElderry, OBE, lately General Manager and Legal Representative in Greece of the Lake Copais Co. Ltd.
- Leslie Herbert Mitchell, OBE, First Secretary at Her Majesty's Embassy in (Washington.
- Richard Bartram Boyd Tollinton, OBE, Her Majesty's Consul-General at Leopoldville.
- Lewis Charles Wilcher, Principal of the University College of Khartoum, Sudan.
- John Beaumont, OBE, AFC, Commandant, Technical Training College, Indian Air Force, Jalahalli, India.
- Michael James Condon, managing director, Burma Oil Company, Karachi, Pakistan.
- William Edward Lodewyk Hamilton Crowther, DSO, V.D, MB, B.S, a prominent physician in the State of Tasmania.
- Thomas Henry Grey, a Member of the Board of the Rhodesia Railways, formerly General Secretary of the Rhodesia Railways Workers' Union.
- Elvie Quigley, MBE. For services to philanthropic movements in Launceston, State of Tasmania.
- Horace Briggs Walker, Registrar of Motor Vehicles, State of South Australia.
- Herbert Ison Wonfor, former Chairman of the Chamber of Commerce, Madras, India.
- Abubakar Tafawa Balewa, OBE, Federal Minister of Transport, Federation of Nigeria.
- Arthur Grenfell Barton. For public services in the Falkland Islands.
- John Ramsay Baxter. For public services in North Borneo.
- Rowland William Cunningham Baker-Beall, MBE, lately Deputy Financial Secretary of the Federation of Nigeria.
- Charles Edward James Biggs, Director of Agriculture, Tanganyika.
- Cyril Handley Bird. For public services in Uganda.
- Herbert Alan Campbell, OBE. For services to the rubber industry in the Federation of Malaya.
- Hugh Gordon Hylvestra Cummins, Leader of the House of Assembly, and Minister of Social Services, Barbados.
- Edgar Cuschieri, OBE, Treasurer and Director of Contracts, Malta.
- George de Nobriga. For public services in Trinidad.
- James Milner Fraser, Manager, Singapore Improvement Trust.
- Charles William Hayward, Commissioner of Customs and Excise, East Africa.
- Major Frank Horatio de Vere Joyce, MC. For public services in Kenya.
- John Roger Kynaston, OBE. For public services in Aden.
- George William Lines, MBE, Director of Agriculture, Sierra Leone.
- Jane McCotter, MBE. For public services in the Western Region, Nigeria.
- Peter McNee, Director, Drainage and Irrigation Department, Federation of Malaya.
- Colonel Frederick Stewart Modera, DSO, MC. For public services in Kenya.
- Richard Hercules Wingfield Pakenham, OBE, Senior Commissioner, Zanzibar.
- John Byron Renwick. For public services in Grenada, Windward Islands.
- Audrey Isabel Richards, Director, East African Institute of Social Research, Makerere College, Uganda.
- Stafford Lofthouse Sands. For public services in the Bahamas.
- James Edward Windrum, MVO, British Agent and Consul, Tonga.
- James Wright, Director of Agriculture, Jamaica.

Honorary Commander

- Mustapha Albakri bin Haji Hassan, OBE, Member for Industrial and Social Relations, Federation of Malaya.

==== Officer of the Order of the British Empire (OBE) ====
Military Division

Royal Navy

- The Reverend Herbert Wright Brierley, Chaplain.
- Commander (E) Frederick John Stanley Corney, (Retired).
- Commander Charles Gerald Forsberg.
- Commander (S) Gilbert Ferriby Franklin.
- Surgeon Commander Thomas Wilson Froggatt, MB, BCh.
- Captain John Rossiter Hayward, Royal Fleet Auxiliary Service.
- Acting Commander Ian Alistair Leitch. (On loan to the Indian Navy.)
- Commander (L) Walter Ivan Nixon.
- Commander Charles Frederick Nock, DSO, (Retired).
- Commander Sidney Hugh Pinchin, DSC.
- Mr. Harold Ringshaw, Chief Engineer, Royal Fleet Auxiliary Service.
- Lieutenant-Colonel Donald Harry William Sanders, Royal Marines.

Army

- Lieutenant-Colonel John Donald Adams (47502) Royal Regiment of Artillery.
- Lieutenant-Colonel John Edward Corby Anderson, TD, (64068), The Queen's Own Royal Glasgow Yeomanry, Royal Armoured Corps, Territorial Army.
- Lieutenant-Colonel (temporary) John Thomas Benn, MBE, (66942), Royal Regiment of Artillery.
- Lieutenant-Colonel (temporary) Peter Edward Moore Bradley, DSO, (63546), Royal Corps of Signals.
- Lieutenant-Colonel Herbert Henry Broadbent, TD, (58695), Corps of Royal Electrical and Mechanical Engineers, Territorial Army.
- Lieutenant-Colonel Reginald Leslie Broom, MC, TD, (151058), Royal Regiment of Artillery, Territorial Army (now T.A.R.O.).
- Lieutenant-Colonel The Right Honourable Edward Southwell, Baron de Clifford, TD, (36391), Corps of Royal Electrical and Mechanical Engineers.
- Lieutenant-Colonel (acting) Bertrand Dawson Cotton, TD, (77818), Royal Regiment of Artillery, Territorial Army.
- Lieutenant-Colonel (temporary) George Ferry Crooks (189722), Royal Army Ordnance Corps.
- Lieutenant-Colonel David Alfred Duke (44049), The Royal Scots (The Royal Regiment) (Employed List (1)).
- Lieutenant-Colonel (acting) William Henry George Dunbar, TD, (19774), 4th Kent (St. Augustines) Battalion, Home Guard.
- Lieutenant-Colonel (Quartermaster) Stanley Ernest Ellis (115303), Royal Regiment of Artillery (now (retired).
- Lieutenant-Colonel Wilfred Desmond Ellis, TD, (71676), The Middlesex Regiment (Duke of Cambridge's Own), Territorial Army.
- Lieutenant-Colonel William Forbes Finlayson (64364), Royal Army Dental Corps.
- Lieutenant-Colonel Alfred Lockwood Gadd (175770), Royal Army Educational Corps.
- Major John Charles Pengelley Madden-Gaskell, MBE, TD, (20596), General List (now retired).
- Lieutenant-Colonel Richard Hamilton Glyn, TD, (45164), Royal Regiment of Artillery, Territorial Army.
- Lieutenant-Colonel (acting) John Francis Edwin Goad (195713), Army Cadet Force.
- Lieutenant-Colonel James Arthur d'Avigdor-Goldsmid, MC, (53368), 4th/7th Royal Dragoon Guards, Royal Armoured Corps.
- Lieutenant-Colonel John Henry Gomersall (173353), Royal Army Ordnance Corps.
- Lieutenant-Colonel (temporary) Ian Rollo Graeme (56580), Royal Regiment of Artillery.
- Lieutenant-Colonel Ian Stuart Gray, MC, TD, (75430), Royal Tank Regiment, Royal Armoured Corps, Territorial Army.
- Lieutenant-Colonel (temporary) Michael William Henry Head (58030), Royal Regiment of Artillery.
- Major (Local Lieutenant-Colonel) Gerald Rowley Heyland, MC, (71112), The Suffolk Regiment.
- Lieutenant-Colonel (acting) Charles Frederick Spencer Hill, MM, TD, (36274), Combined Cadet Force.
- Major Hugo Craster Wakeford Ironside (77706), Royal Tank Regiment, Royal Armoured Corps.
- Lieutenant-Colonel Edward Clayton Carter Lewis (39373), Royal Army Service Corps (now R.A.R.O.).
- Lieutenant-Colonel Gordon Macleod (53041), Royal Army Service Corps.
- Lieutenant-Colonel Thomas McGregor McNie, MB, MRCOG, (56405), Royal Army Medical Corps.
- Lieutenant-Colonel (Local Colonel) St. Leger Morris (37272), The King's Own Yorkshire (Light Infantry, (Employed (List (1)) (now R.A.R.O.).
- Lieutenant-Colonel (temporary) Albert William Penna (195935), Royal Army Ordnance Corps.
- Lieutenant-Colonel Walter John Macdonald Ross, MC, TD, (66551), The King's Own Scottish Borderers, Territorial Army.
- Lieutenant-Colonel Roy Cecil Salmon (230901), Corps of Royal Electrical and Mechanical Engineers.
- Lieutenant-Colonel Felix James Moncrieff Schuster, TD, (88116), The Rifle Brigade (Prince Consort's Own), Territorial Army.
- Lieutenant-Colonel Harold Sydney Sell, MC, TD, (56366), The Durham Light Infantry, Territorial Army.
- Lieutenant-Colonel Lawrence Nelson Smith (41190), Royal Regiment of Artillery (Employed List (1)).
- Brevet Lieutenant-Colonel Eugene Vincent Strickland, DSO, MM, (66223), 16th/5th Lancers, Royal Armoured Corps.
- Lieutenant-Colonel William Hepworth-Taylor (36399), Royal Army Service Corps.
- Lieutenant-Colonel Ernest Waddington, MC, TD, (73585), Royal Regiment of Artillery, Territorial Army.
- Lieutenant-Colonel Gordon Robert Alexander Wixley (113126), Royal Regiment of Artillery, Territorial Army.
- Lieutenant-Colonel George Holland Hartley, Rhodesian African Rifles.
- Major Evan George Stewart, DSO, ED, Commanding Officer, Home Guard, Royal Hong Kong Defence Force.

Royal Air Force

- Group Captain Harry Emlyn Bufton, DSO, DFC, AFC.
- Wing Commander Frank George Foot (40902).
- Wing Commander Arthur Kenneth Furse, DFC, (39512).
- Wing Commander Charles Clement Howes (35198).
- Wing Commander John Ernest Allen-Jones (81434).
- Wing Commander Walter Noel Kenyon, AFC, (88395).
- Wing Commander Richard Cyril Pearson (35276).
- Wing Commander Edward Francis Pippet (37119).
- Wing Commander Reginald Alexander Roy (46100).
- Wing Commander Charles Francis Norman Seaman (201646).
- Wing Commander Richard David Williams (39182).
- Acting Wing Commander John Finch, DFC, AFC, (64308).
- Acting Wing Commander John Hope Pool, MD, BS, (90789), Royal Auxiliary Air Force Reserve of Officers.
- Squadron Leader Ernest Claude Bennett, DFM, (46218).
- Squadron Leader Frank William Marius Jensen, DFC, AFC, (102058).
- Squadron Leader Arthur Charles Morris (89029).
- Squadron Leader John Robert Oswald (45456).
- Squadron Leader Stanley William Timmis (45879).
- Squadron Leader Alfred Lewis Walker (114645).
- Acting Squadron Leader Frank Kasz (122885), RAF Volunteer Reserve.

Civil Division

- Jack Caudrey Abraham, BEM, Honorary Treasurer, Royal Naval Benevolent Trust.
- Henry William Lyon Absalom, assistant director, Meteorological Office, Air Ministry.
- Basil William Armstrong, MC, MB, B.S, lately Medical Superintendent, The Royal Sea Bathing Hospital, Margate.
- Harold James Atkinson, Area General Manager, North Eastern Division, National Coal Board.
- George Watson Bain, Chief Engineer, SS Mauretania, Cunard Steamship Co. Ltd.
- Stanley Watson Bainbridge, Principal Information Officer, Ministry of Transport and Civil Aviation.
- Arthur Charles Baker, Assistant Regional Controller, Eastern, Regional Office, Ministry of Labour and National Service.
- Elizabeth Marian Maxwell Balfour, County Director, Hampshire, British Red Cross Society.
- Arthur Vincent Barker, Deputy General Manager, Navy, Army and Air Force Institutes.
- Arthur Beauchamp, MRCS, LRCP, General Practitioner, Birmingham. For services to the Ministry of Health.
- Frederick Evylen James Behn, chief executive officer, Office of the Commissioners of Crown Lands.
- Joseph Blewitt, MBE, JP, Midlands Regional Secretary, Transport and General Workers' Union.
- Maurice Francis Bond, Clerk of the Records, Offices of the House of Lords.
- John James Breslin, Principal, Board of Trade.
- Richard Cain, President, World Manx Association.
- Lucy Evelyn Cheesman. For services to Entomology.
- Mary Cheney, chairman, Oxford County Youth Employment Committee.
- Herbert James Clare, MBE, Chief Commissioner, National Savings Committee.
- Francis James Clark, Deputy Chief Inspector, Postal Services Department, General Post Office.
- Douglas Hardcastle Clarke, MC, Appointments Officer, British Broadcasting Corporation.
- Alderman John Clarricoats, General Secretary, Radio Society of Great Britain.
- Alfred John Claydon, Principal Inspector, Board of Customs and Excise.
- Ralph Hedworth Clough, Senior District Inspector of Mines, West Midland and Southern Division, Ministry of Fuel and Power.
- Harold Clowes, JP, Councillor, Stoke-on-Trent Borough Council.
- Walter Thomas Cockle, MBE, Honorary Secretary, Barking Savings Committee, Essex.
- Henry Edwin Arthur Condon, Principal Clerk, Board of Inland Revenue.
- Robert Connor, DSM, Director and General Manager, Measurement Ltd., Oldham, Lancashire.
- George Robert Acworth Conquest, Principal, Foreign Office.
- Wilfred John Corbet, Industrial Disputes Officer, Guernsey.
- Arthur David Richards Cowley, Principal Regional Architect, Birmingham, Ministry of Housing and Local Government.
- Edith Margaret Jane Cowper. For political and public services in Lancashire.
- David Leonard Craig, Manager, Italy, British European Airways.
- Deodora Croft. For political and public services in Wandsworth.
- Richard Benedict Cunningham, Higher Collector, Birmingham, Board of Customs and Excise.
- Eliot Cecil Curwen, MRCS, LRCP, Honorary Physician to the Police Convalescent Seaside Home, Hove.
- George Daly, MBE, Staff Controller, Engineering Department, General Post Office.
- Robert John Davies. For political and public services in North Wales.
- Major James Dawson, JP. For public services in Lancashire.
- Margery Phyllis Deslandes, Principal, Ministry of Housing and Local Government.
- George Clifford Diamond, Headmaster, High School for Boys, Cardiff.
- Major Hugh Dixon, chairman, Keighley, Skipton and District War Pensions Committee, West Riding of Yorkshire.
- Peter Arthur Domeisen, Principal Intelligence Officer, British Services Security Organization, Germany.
- John Herbert Drayson, Chief Accountant, Board of Trade.
- Marjorie Drury, General Secretary, Central Council for the Care of Cripples.
- Herbert Duckworth, Superintending Electrical Engineer, Admiralty Engineering Laboratory, West Drayton.
- Isabel Grace Wharton Duff, chairman, Moray and Nairn Education Committee.
- William Jesse Dyer, Resident Engineer, Hanningfield Reservoir, Essex.
- George Douglas Elliot, Works Manager (Iron), Appleby-Frodingham Branch, United Steel Companies Ltd., Sheffield.
- Eliot James Wilfred Ely, chief executive officer, Ministry of Pensions and National Insurance.
- Wynn Hawyn Evans, Principal Scientific Officer, Safety in Mines Research Establishment, Ministry of Fuel and Power.
- William John Felton, Secretary, Institution of Mining and Metallurgy.
- Alick Hayden Finney, Chief Officer, Staffordshire Fire Brigade.
- Robert Foster, MBE, Chief Actuary of the London Trustee Savings Bank.
- Arthur Frederick Fountain, Secretary, Civil Service Sanatorium Society.
- Alderman George Robert Critchley Fox, JP. For political and public services in the West Riding of Yorkshire.
- Captain Peter Frank Frai, VRD, Royal Naval Volunteer Reserve (Retired), lately Chief Representative for Scotland, King George's Fund for Sailors.
- Isaac Arthur Franks, Member of the Licensed Non-Residential Establishment Wages Board.
- George Freeman, Honorary Treasurer, Birmingham Savings Committee.
- Anthony Herbert Gardner, TD. For political services.
- Harold Garside, Principal, Ministry of Agriculture and Fisheries.
- Henry Arthur Geelan, Commissioner of Police, Belfast.
- Alderman William Alfred Gibson, JP. For political and public services in Cheshire.
- Francis Charles Morgan-Giles, managing director, Morgan Giles Ltd., Teignmouth, Devonshire.
- George Henry Giles, Secretary and Director of Examinations, British Optical Association.
- Alfred Ernest Gollop, assistant director of Storage, Ministry of Supply.
- George Herbert Goode, deputy director of Statistics, Ministry of Labour and National Service.
- James Gordon, MBE, Principal, Commonwealth Relations Office.
- Frederic Ascott Gould, lately Senior Principal Scientific Officer, National Physical Laboratory, Department of Scientific and Industrial Research.
- Peter Leonard Gould, Member, Welsh Board for Industry.
- Leslie Ernest Gray, lately chairman, Distribution Section, Tea Division, Ministry of Food.
- The Honourable Richard Francis Maynard Greville. For political services.
- Lieutenant-Colonel George Campbell Goldney Grey. For political and public services in Somerset.
- Leonard Hagestadt, Deputy Regional Controller, London and South Eastern Region, Ministry of Labour and National Service.
- Arthur Harold Hammond, Principal, Home Office.
- Harry Oswald Harries, chairman, London Welsh Association.
- David Harrison, Chief Examiner, Board of Inland Revenue.
- Arthur Stanley Hartshorn, recently Scientific Attaché, Her Majesty's Embassy, Paris (now Principal Scientific Officer, Royal Aircraft Establishment, Farnborough).
- John Tattersall Haynes, General Manager, Western Division, Southern Gas Board.
- Henry Hayward, Assistant Controller, Operations Branch, London Postal Region, General Post Office.
- Cecil Heap, JP, General Secretary, Wallpaper Workers' Union.
- Reginald Ernest Hedger, Attached War Office.
- James Joseph Hegan, Principal, Moseley & Kings Heath Evening Institute, Birmingham.
- Gerald Aubrey Hill, Director, Higgs & Hill Ltd., Crown Works, London.
- Henry Hill, Member, Board of Customs and Excise Diamond Committee.
- Bernard Reginald Hillard, Assistant Regional Controller, Ministry of Pensions and National Insurance.
- Ronald Sidney Hope, Director, Seafarers' Education Service and College of the Sea.
- Arthur Trobridge Horton, Principal Scientific Officer, Ministry of Defence.
- The Reverend Francis Harry House, Head of Religious Broadcasting, British Broadcasting Corporation.
- Leslie Howarth, Professor of Applied Mathematics, University of Bristol.
- William Charles Hudson, Assistant Accountant General, Hospitals Management Division, Ministry of Health.
- Robert Thomson Hutcheson, JP, Secretary of the University Court, and Registrar, University of Glasgow.
- Ellen Mary Ibberson, MBE. For services to Music. Director of the Rural Music Schools Association.
- Alderman Fred James, Vice-chairman, Cornwall Agricultural Executive Committee.
- Rolfe Arnold Scott-James, MC, lately Editor of the British Council publication, Britain Today.
- Edward Norman Jamieson, LRCP(Ed.), FRCS.(Ed.), Surgeon, Lewis Hospital, Stornoway.
- Henry Cecil Johnson, Divisional Operating Superintendent, Eastern Region, British Railways.
- Herbert John Jones, Technical Consultant, Hemingway & Co. Ltd.
- John Jones, chief executive officer, Board of Trade. (Lately Deputy Regional Food Officer, Midland and North Midland Regions, Ministry of Food.)
- Alexander Speirs Kelly, HM Inspector of Schools, Scottish Education Department.
- Hugh Kelly, General Secretary, Plumbing Trades Union.
- Nellie King, MBE, Member, representing North Wiltshire, National Savings Assembly.
- James Kirkwood, Director of Practical Dairying, West of Scotland Agricultural College, Auchincruive, Ayrshire.
- Matthew Lamont. For political and public services in Ayrshire.
- James Frederick Lane, JP. For public services in Battersea.
- Margaret Millar Lawson. For public services in Belfast.
- Arthur Moss Lee, chairman, Kettering and District Hospital Management Committee.
- Herman Roderick Lindars. For services in the field of fuel efficiency.
- John Lindley, JP, chairman, Bury Local Employment Committee and Disablement Advisory Committee.
- James Rene Lindsay, Chief Registrar, Principal Probate Registry, Supreme Court of Judicature, Northern Ireland.
- Mary Milroy Lindsay, HM Inspector of Schools, Ministry of Education.
- Archer Lindsey, Principal Information Officer, Central Office of Information.
- Freda Violet Lingstrom, Head of Children's Programmes, Television, British Broadcasting Corporation.
- Arthur Ivor Llewelyn, Chief Research Officer, Headquarters, Bomber Command, Royal Air Force.
- Marion Avis Lloyd. For political services.
- Claude Frederick Nelson Longhurst, Principal, Board of Customs and Excise.
- Walter Pollock Lucas, JP, chairman, Greenock, Port Glasgow and District Local Employment Committee.
- Charles Luker. For political and public services in Oxfordshire.
- Duncan Mackintosh MacDonald, Firemaster Northern Area Fire Brigade, Scotland.
- George Watkins McNeil, Trade Commissioner, Board of Trade.
- Albert James Maker, Alderman, Reading County Borough Council.
- Frederick Peter Russell Mallows, Senior Legal Assistant, Ministry of Agriculture and Fisheries.
- Captain John Henry Jones Martin, Works Manager, Elswick and Scotswood Works, Vickers-Armstrongs Ltd.
- James Matthews, MBE, Trade Union Side Secretary, National Joint Council for Civil Air Transport.
- George Alfred May, deputy director of Cold Storage, Ministry of Food.
- Alderman Sidney Arthur Maycock, JP, Editor of The Smallholder.
- Alderman Samuel Thomas Melsom, JP. For public services in Oldbury, Worcestershire.
- Andrew Millar. For public services in Belfast.
- Wing Commander Geoffrey William Monk, DFC, Divisional Air Traffic Control Officer, Scottish Divisional Headquarters, Ministry of Transport and Civil Aviation.
- Geoffrey Miles Morant, Principal Scientific Officer, Royal Air Force Institute of Aviation Medicine, Farnborough.
- Cyril Douglas Morgan, MC, Principal Clerk to the Chamberlain of London.
- Alan Greenwood Morkill, chairman, Colonial Committee of the Victoria League.
- James Alexander Fraser Morrison, MM, City Quantity Surveyor, Dundee.
- Arthur Edward Morton, JP. For political and public services in Cambridgeshire.
- Captain William Francis Lister Newcombe, MBE, TD, Secretary, Army Cadet Force, and Combined Cadet Force, Associations.
- Victor Patrick O'Connor, Regional Manager, South Eastern London and the South Eastern Regions, Central Land Board and War Damage Commission.
- William Oliver, lately Secretary, Hull Trawler Officers' Guild.
- Harold Grey Padbury, lately Area Meat and Livestock Officer, London Area, Ministry of Food.
- William Jones Pate, National Secretary for Wales, Young Men’s Christian Association.
- Ruth Hope Pecker, Registrar, General Nursing Council for Scotland.
- Peter Philip, Area Manager, Dundee, North of Scotland Hydro-Electric Board.
- Percy Nicholas Piggott, assistant director for Wales, Ministry of Works.
- Captain Philip Ernest Hastings Potter, Master, MV Port Hardy, Bibby Line Ltd.
- Alderman Alfred James Pugh, chairman, West Cheshire Water Board.
- Harry Purt, Secretary, Leicester and County Chamber of Commerce.
- Helen Marjorie Ramsden, MBE, Honorary Secretary, Scunthorpe Savings Committee.
- William Arthur Hugh Redwood. For services in the field of religion.
- Donald Henry Reed, Superintending Examiner, Patent Office, Board of Trade.
- Charles Arthur Richards, Superintending Architect, War Office.
- Thomas Dow Richardson. For services to British Skating.
- Eric Lewis Ripley, Principal Scientific Officer, Structures Department, Ministry of Supply.
- John Herbert Owen Roberts, MD, JP, Medical Superintendent, North Wales Hospital for Nervous and Mental Disorders, Denbigh.
- Vernon Watkin Madoc Roberts, Commercial Manager, Electronics Department, British Thomson-Houston Co. Ltd., Rugby.
- Herzl Ruben, Principal Officer, Ministry of Commerce, Northern Ireland.
- Arthur Ryder, Director (Inspection, Transport and Warehouses), HM Stationery Office.
- Lieutenant-Colonel Frederick Charles Saxon, MC, chairman, Chester, Runcorn and District War Pensions Committee.
- Jack Shackleton, Engineering, Superintendent of Design, Atomic Energy Authority.
- James Shanks, Principal Officer, Ministry of Agriculture, Northern Ireland.
- John Leighton Sharratt, Borough Engineer and Surveyor, Shoreditch.
- Leonard Edwin Arthur Shave. For political and public services in Kent.
- Beatrice Annie Shaw, Matron, Harefield Hospital, Middlesex.
- William John Shea, MBE, Principal, Ministry of Transport and Civil Aviation.
- Observer Captain Ivor David Richard Sims, Commandant, Southern Area, Royal Observer Corps.
- John Sutcliffe Spence, lately chairman, South of Scotland Wholesale Meat Supply Association.
- Robert Spence, Director and General Manager, John Hastie & Co. Ltd., Greenock, Renfrewshire.
- Allen James Sugden. For political and public services in the Spen Valley.
- Cyril Ryan Williford Tindall, Senior Legal Assistant, Office of HM Procurator General and Treasury Solicitor.
- Stanley Herbert Titford, Secretary, London Corn Trade Association Ltd., 1919–1954.
- Donald Todd, deputy director of Armament Supply, Admiralty.
- David Victor Turner, Chief Constable, Swansea Borough Police Force.
- Dorothy May Vatsey, General Secretary, Friends of the Poor.
- Michael George Francis Ventris. For services to Mycenaean paleography.
- George Alexander Vowles, Divisional Controller, Yorkshire Division, British Electricity Authority.
- Frederick William Wadely, Master of the Music, Carlisle Cathedral.
- George Wall, chief executive officer, Air Ministry.
- Wilson Walton, Regional Controller, East and West Ridings Region, National Assistance Board.
- Alderman George Frederick Warburton. For political and public services in Derby.
- Professor Frederick Victor Warnock, Head of the Department of Mechanical Engineering, Belfast Municipal College of Technology.
- Norman Horace Arthur Warren, Senior Principal Scientific Officer, Admiralty Gunnery Establishment, Portland.
- David Watson, Principal, Ministry of Works.
- Douglas Robinson Wattleworth, chairman, Workington and District Local Employment Committee.
- Laurence Whistler, Designer and Writer.
- Harry Whitaker, MBE, Head of Division, Tithe Redemption Commission.
- Leonard Whitehouse, JP. For public services in Staffordshire.
- Alderman Percival Nathan Whitley, JP, chairman, Halifax Education Committee.
- Cicely Joan Whittington, MBE, Director, Overseas Branches Department, British Red Cross Society.
- Eric Stewart Willbourn, ED, Deputy-Director, Colonial Geological Surveys.
- Gerald Vernon Williams, Principal Inspector of Taxes, Board of Inland Revenue.
- Peter Michael Williams. For public services in Cornwall.
- Robert Wilson, JP, chairman, Braemar Knitwear Ltd., Hawick, Roxburghshire.
- Arthur William Yeoman. For services to the Retail Fruit Trade.
- William Harry Yoxall, GM, Principal Inspection Officer, Aeronautical Inspection Directorate, Midland Area, Ministry of Supply.
- Dennis Bernard James Ambler, lately First Secretary (Assistant Regional Information Officer), Office of the Commissioner-General for Her Majesty's Government in the United Kingdom in South-East Asia.
- Henry William Carter, British subject lately resident in China.
- Major John Fleming Gumming, lately District Commissioner, Upper Nile Province, Sudan.
- Ralph Marshall Dexter, British subject resident in Italy.
- Robert Howard Elkington, British subject resident in Egypt.
- Frederick Michael MacLeod Forster, Deputy Governor, Kassala Province, Sudan.
- Hilda Mary Hatton, lately chairman, British Army of the Rhine Central Committee for Displaced Persons in Germany.
- Ronald Chalmers Kelt, MBE, Engineer in Chief and Inspector-General of Ports and Navigation, Port Directorate, Basra.
- Henry Hutchison Lennox, MC, British subject lately resident in China.
- Francois Paul List, MBE, Joint President of the British Luxembourg Society, Luxembourg.
- The Venerable Archdeacon Charles Sidney Neale, Archdeacon in charge of Christ Church, Rio de Janeiro.
- Thomas James Oliver, Public Safety Adviser, Control Commission for Germany (British Element).
- Peter George Upton Pope, Temporary Chief Executive Officer, Control Commission for Germany (British Element).
- Geoffrey Herbert Grant Richards, Director, Mechanical Transport Department, Sudan Government.
- William Marsden Ford Robertson, MD, medical director of the Lebanon Hospital for Mental and Nervous Disorders, Beirut.
- Derek Aimone Antona Traversi, British Council Representative in Chile.
- Joseph Albert Whitlock, Labour Adviser on the West Coast of the United States of America to Her Majesty's Embassy in Washington.
- William Baddeley Adams, former Manager of the Havelock Asbestos Mine, Swaziland.
- Cecil Roy Baker. For public services in the State of Tasmania.
- Dorothy Carroll, Matron of the Queen Victoria Maternity Hospital, Adelaide, State of South Australia.
- Anthony Drinkwater Chataway, MBE, High Commissioner in the Union of South Africa for the Government of the Federation of Rhodesia and Nyasaland.
- Annie Muriel, Lady Coningham, chairman, Hospitality Committee, Victoria League.
- Donald Henry Cummings, MBE. For services to the Ministry of Finance, Federation of Rhodesia and Nyasaland.
- Constance Muriel Davey, a psychologist. For services to the Education Department and social welfare organisations in the State of South Australia.
- Ryno de Beer. For services to the Mining Industry in Southern Rhodesia.
- Alan Hilliard Donald, District Officer, Basutoland.
- Roger Paul Goode, JP, chairman, St. John Ambulance Association, State of South Australia.
- Harry Gladwyn Harcourt, DSO, MC, JP, employed in the Industrial Development Branch of the Premier's Department, State of Tasmania.
- Vivian William Hiller, Chief Archivist, Central African Archives, Federation of Rhodesia and Nyasaland.
- James Hutchinson Kennedy, BM, BCh, Government Medical Officer at Ndanga, Southern Rhodesia.
- James Harold Krikler, Chairman of the Town Management Board, Shaibani, Southern Rhodesia.
- John Malcolm Lambert. For services to the United Kingdom community in Chittagong, Pakistan.
- Henry Campbell MacColl, former Manager of the Bombay Branch of the Chartered Bank of India, Australia and China.
- Patrick John Frederick Parsons. For services to members of the United Kingdom community, particularly ex-servicemen, in Calcutta, India.
- Denise Eleanor Sanderson, Staff Matron and Head of the Southern Rhodesia Nursing Service.
- John Hancock Strangman, chairman, Waikerie District Council, State of South Australia.
- Peter Simon Achimugu, Minister for Natural Resources, Northern Region, Nigeria.
- Michael Charles Atkinson, Administrative Officer, Western Region, Nigeria.
- David Alexander Baird, MB, ChB, Director of Medical Services, Somaliland.
- The Right Reverend Alberi Kakyomya Balya, Assistant Bishop of Uganda.
- Colin Campbell, Colonial Secretary, Falkland Islands.
- Diarmaid William Conroy, TD, QC, Attorney-General, Gibraltar.
- Eric Clifford Crawford. For public services in Trinidad.
- James Cornelius Odofumi Crowther, JP. For public services in Sierra Leone.
- The Reverend Bernard Joseph Davis. For services to Education in North Borneo.
- Vishnu Deo. For public services in Fiji.
- William Rees Evans, Director of Agriculture, Bermuda.
- Chief Samuel Ajaye Falade, JP, (The Lejoka of Ilesha). For public services in the Western Region, Nigeria.
- Eric Charles Guy Fuller, lately Deputy Accountant-General, Nigeria.
- Thassos Charidimos Gircotis. For medical services in Cyprus.
- Goh Hood Kiat. For public services in Singapore.
- Joseph Bernard Gould, lately Establishment Officer, Kenya, and Secretary, East African Salaries Commission.
- Harry St. Ledger Grenfell, MC. For public services in Northern Rhodesia.
- Norman Henry Hardy. For public services in Kenya.
- Reginald Wilfred Higginson. For public services in the Gold Coast.
- Ho Seng Ong. For services to Education in the Federation of Malaya.
- Frank Humphreys, Administrative Officer, Northern Region, Nigeria.
- William Edward Hutchinson, ED, MD, JP, assistant director of Medical Services (Civil Defence), Singapore.
- Muriel Frances Ellen Pelham-Johnson, assistant director of Education, Tanganyika.
- Abdul Karim Yusufali Alibhai Karimjee, JP. For public services in Tanganyika.
- Alan Kennedy, Director, Electrical Department, Bahamas.
- Koh Sin Hock, JP. For public services in the Federation of Malaya.
- Louis Cools-Lartigue, Chief Secretary, Windward Islands.
- Law Ohemg Phuan. For public services in Sarawak.
- Jack Hayden Lewis, Commissioner of Prisons, Kenya.
- John Lilly, Director, Department of Rural Water Development, Gold Coast.
- James McMahon, Entomologist, Kenya.
- Chief Kidaha Makwaia. For public services in Tanganyika.
- Anthony Mamo, Deputy Attorney-General, Malta.
- Andrew Gillespie Marshall. For public services in Nigeria.
- David Butler Mills, Superintending Engineer, Buildings Branch, Public Works Department, Kenya.
- Alan Shepherd Milward, Deputy Chief Engineer, Office of the Crown Agents for Oversea Governments and Administrations.
- Joseph O'Connor, MBE, Secretary to the Governor and Commander-in-Chief and Clerk to the Executive Council, Trinidad.
- Alexander Oppenheim, Professor of Mathematics, University of Malaya.
- William Blake Ouseley, Senior Assistant Director of Education, Uganda.
- Edward Maurice Frederick Payne, assistant director of Education, Federation of Malaya.
- Ernest Cuthbert Peterkins. For public services in Nyasaland.
- John Shaw Rennie, Deputy Colonial Secretary, Mauritius.
- George Herbert Rusbridger, deputy director of African Education, Northern Rhodesia.
- Loris Rohan Sharples, MB, ChB. For public services in British Guiana.
- Major Hugh Beaumont Shepheard, Liaison Officer for Nigerian Students in the United Kingdom.
- The Reverend Hugh Braham Sherlock. For public services in Jamaica.
- Eustace Maxwell Shilstone, MBE. For public services in Barbados.
- Francis Walkey Smith, Government Printer, British Honduras.
- The Reverend Joseph Johannes David Stegmann. For public services in Nyasaland.
- John William Stobart, Manager, Road Transport Department, Sierra Leone.
- Edmund Strickland, Superintendent of Physical Education, Singapore.
- Umar Suleiman, Emir of Bedde, Northern Region, Nigeria.
- Francis William Toovey, Director, West African Institute for Oil Palm Research.
- Richard Frank Tring, Commandant of the Government Guards, Aden.
- Wong Pak Kan. For public services in Hong Kong.
- Alhaji Yahaya Madawaki, Madawakin Ilorin and Minister of Health, Northern Region, Nigeria.
- Waiter Ansley Young, MRCS, LRCP, JP. For public services in the Federation of Malaya.
- Carl Theodore Quinn-Young, Director of Education, Eastern Region, Nigeria.

Honorary Officer

- Chik Mohamad Yusuf bin Sheikh Abdul Rahman, JP. For public services in the Federation of Malaya.

==== Member of the Order of the British Empire (MBE) ====
Military Division

Royal Navy

- Temporary Senior Commissioned Electrical Officer (L) Albert Frederick Bowles, (Retired).
- Lieutenant (Quartermaster) Alan Cyril Levin Callaway, Royal Marines.
- Senior Commissioned Gunner (T) Frederick Charles Carroll.
- Lieutenant-Commander (E) William Frederick Morgan Davies, (Retired).
- Commissioned Recruiter Charles Henry Manuel.
- Lieutenant-at-Arms Arthur George Miller.
- Lieutenant-Commander Herbert Eugene Mansbridge Mole.
- Lieutenant-Commander (S) Louis Harry Morrison. (Lately on loan to the Royal Malayan Navy.)
- Lieutenant-Commander (S) Reginald Arthur Price, DSC, (Retired).
- Instructor Lieutenant-Commander James Henry John Rowe.
- Lieutenant (E) Claude Glinton Smith, (Retired).
- Temporary Lieutenant-Commander (Sp.) Charles Haskell-Thomas, Royal Naval Volunteer Reserve.
- Shipwright Lieutenant Alexander George Williams.

Army

- Major William Alexander Adam (179679), Royal Corps of Signals.
- Major Thomas Charles Ayres, TD, (96011), Royal Army Medical Coops, Territorial Army.
- Major (now Lieutenant-Colonel (temporary)) Desmond John Howard Bannister, MC, (66109), The Devonshire Regiment.
- Major Cyril Lane Barnes, MC, TD, (56870), The Duke of Cornwall's Light Infantry, Territorial Army and Combined Cadet Force.
- Major Francis John Bastin (326989), Royal Corps of Signals, Territorial Army.
- 22259784 Warrant Officer Class I Frank William Orlando Battle, The Bedfordshire and Hertfordshire Regiment, Territorial Army.
- Captain Ivor Robert Bessant (333112), Royal Army Medical Corps, Territorial Army.
- Major (Quartermaster) Sydney George Betts, TD, (79536), The Lancashire Fusiliers.
- 2979240 Warrant Officer Class I Richard Thomas Boyde, DCM, The Argyll and Sutherland Highlanders (Princess Louise's).
- Major Daniel Buckley (240782), Royal Regiment of Artillery.
- Major William Norman Bygate, TD, (69482), Royal Regiment of Artillery, Territorial Army.
- 1871189 Warrant Officer Class II Douglas Cecil Clayton, Corps of Royal Engineers.
- Major (Local Lieutenant-Colonel) Arthur Bernard Cook (176964), The Rifle Brigade (Prince Consort's Own) (Employed List (3)).
- 5375421 Warrant Officer Class II Percy Reginald Frank Cox, The Oxfordshire and Buckinghamshire Light Infantry, Territorial Army.
- Major (acting) Denys Kingwill Crews, TD, (75877), Combined Cadet Force.
- Captain Edward Davies, TD, (89070), The Royal Welch Fusiliers, Territorial Army.
- 1873895 Warrant Officer Class I Ronald Stanley Derrick, Royal Army Pay Corps.
- Major (acting) Richard Michael Digby, 3rd Hampshire (Alton) Battalion, Home Guard.
- 21129451 Warrant Officer Class II William Henry Dixon, Royal Regiment of Artillery, Territorial Army.
- Major John Bartlett Dodds, TD, (70636), Corps of Royal Engineers.
- 6005306 Warrant Officer Class II Francis Earnest Edwards, Royal Regiment of Artillery, Territorial Army.
- Captain Robert Alfred Foster (181408), Corps of Royal Engineers.
- S/57643 Warrant Officer Class I Donald Charles John Goddard, Royal Army Service Corps.
- Captain Arthur Edward Chase Green, TD, (94000), Honourable Artillery Company, Territorial Army.
- 3192507 Warrant Officer Class I (now Warrant Officer Class II) George Brown Gunn, The Lanarkshire Yeomanry, Royal Armoured Corps, Territorial Army.
- 25402 Warrant Officer Class II Richard Edward Gurney, MM, Honourable Artillery Company, Territorial Army.
- Captain (Quartermaster) Daniel David Hale (421049), Small Arms School Corps.
- 7586462 Warrant Officer Class I Lewis Nelson Halsall, Royal Armoured Corps.
- Major Alexander Hamill, TD, (194569), Royal Regiment of Artillery, Territorial Army.
- 806195 Warrant Officer Class I Christopher Victor Harding, Royal Regiment of Artillery.
- Captain (Quartermaster) James Arthur Harris (309872), Corps of Royal Engineers.
- Lieutenant (Quartermaster) (formerly Warrant Officer Class I) Elsie Elizabeth Harrison (436858), Women's Royal Army Corps.
- Major (temporary) George Thomas Harwood (358836), Royal Regiment of Artillery (Employed List (3).
- 729164 Warrant Officer Class II Alfred Hemingway, Royal Corps of Signals, Territorial Army.
- 121358 Warrant Officer Class II John Winship Hetherington, The Parachute Regiment, Territorial Army.
- 3651093 Warrant Officer Class II Frederick Holton, The South Lancashire Regiment (The Prince of Wales's Volunteers).
- Captain Eric Lawford Hughes, TD, (102833), Royal Regiment of Artillery, Territorial Army.
- 550532 Warrant Officer Class I (Bandmaster) Roy Hurst, 14th/20th King's Hussars, Royal Armoured Corps.
- Captain (Quartermaster) John William Jones (345686), The Durham Light Infantry.
- Major Robert Norman Legge, MM, (168263), Corps of Royal Engineers.
- Major (acting) Herman William Levy (275601), Army Cadet Force.
- 728797 Warrant Officer Class II Henry Lowrey, Royal Regiment of Artillery, Territorial Army.
- Major (Mechanist Officer) Francis James Norman McCann (95418), Royal Army Service Corps (Employed List (2X)).
- 22268292 Warrant Officer Class II Joseph Ernest McCausland, North Irish Horse, Royal Armoured Corps, Territorial Army.
- Major Donald Ross McGillivray (203148), The Gordon Highlanders (Employed List (4)).
- Major Harold Gerard McGrath (177021), Army Catering Corps, Territorial Army.
- Captain (acting) Dugald McKillop (351419), Army Cadet Force.
- Captain (Quartermaster) Alexander McLeod, MM, (418859), Royal Tank Regiment, Royal Armoured Corps.
- Major Cuthbert Newbold, ERD, (53912), Royal Corps of Signals.
- Major Peter Percy Pearson (359478), The York and Lancaster Regiment.
- Lieutenant (now Captain) John Herbert Piper (421308), Royal Regiment of Artillery.
- Major (temporary) (now Captain) Richard Hopkins Purvis (137112), Royal Regiment of Artillery.
- Major Leslie Frank Richmond, TD, MB, (47948), Royal Army Medical Corps, Territorial Army.
- 7875479 Warrant Officer Class II Edwin Peircy Roberts, Westminster Dragoons, Royal Armoured Corps, Territorial Army.
- 22226342 Warrant Officer Class I William Burnhope Robson, Corps of Royal Electrical and Mechanical Engineers, Territorial Army.
- Lieutenant (Quartermaster) (temporary Captain) William Ignatius Rooney, MM, (425957), Irish Guards.
- Lieutenant Coralie May Ross (270344), Women's Royal Army Corps, Territorial Army.
- W/196896 Warrant Officer Class II Kathleen Olwen Ryan, Women's Royal Army Corps, (Territorial Army.
- 3518299 Warrant Officer Class II Percy Seddon, The Manchester Regiment, Territorial Army.
- Lieutenant (E.M.A.E.) (formerly Warrant Officer Class I) Alfred Charles Shirlaw (437324), Corps of Royal Electrical and Mechanical Engineers.
- Major (Quartermaster) William Terrance Sloane (195622), The Royal Lincolnshire Regiment (Employed List (4)).
- Major Walter Staples (289425), Corps of Royal Engineers, Territorial Army.
- Major Robert Steele (108138), Grenadier Guards.
- Major (Staff Quartermaster) Darrel Ernest Lumb Street (111058), Employed List (2).
- Major (Quartermaster) John Patrick Stroud (120558), Royal Army Medical Corps.
- Major Robert Henderson Sturrock, TD, (224431), Corps of Royal Military Police, Territorial Army.
- Major (Quartermaster) George Louis Vokins, MM, TD, (74196), Royal Armoured Corps.
- Major (temporary) Harry Bryan Claude Watkins (190477), Royal Tank Regiment, Royal Armoured Corps.
- 318820 Warrant Officer Class I James Edward Watson, DCM, 12th Royal Lancers (Prince of Wales's), Royal Armoured Corps.
- Major (E. & M. O.) Denis White (238299), Corps of Royal Engineers.
- Major Carol Francis Willis, TD, (97009), The Queen's Own Royal West Kent Regiment.
- Major George Cyril Willis, MC, (113958), Royal Regiment of Artillery.
- Major (Quantity Surveyor) (now Lieutenant-Colonel (temporary)) Wesley Frank Willoughby (76518), Corps of Royal Engineers.
- 4535981 Warrant Officer Class II Harry Woolley, The South Staffordshire Regiment.
- 828981 Warrant Officer Class II Robert Harold Yapp, Royal Regiment of Artillery.
- Captain (Quartermaster) Ernest Sidney Cook (350431), The Queen's Own Royal West Kent Regiment, seconded to the 1st (Nyasaland) Battalion, The King's African Rifles.
- Major (local Colonel) Wilfred Harold Marshall (E.C.6901), Special List (ex-Indian Army); at present on loan to the Government of India.
- Major John Stuart Scott Roger, Southern Rhodesia Transport Corps, Territorial Force.
- Major (local Lieutenant-Colonel) Frederick Stanley (O.W.98), Special List (ex-Indian Army); at present on loan to the Government of India.
- Captain Raymond James Minjoot, Singapore Volunteer Corps.

Royal Air Force

- Squadron Leader John Leonard Aron (110492).
- Squadron Leader Joseph William Judge (79925).
- Squadron Leader Ernest Sidney Odbert, MB, BCh, (137280).
- Squadron Leader David Glyndwr Roberts, MM, (146809), RAF Regiment.
- Acting Squadron Leader Clive Chesterfield (67807), RAF Volunteer Reserve.
- Acting Squadron Leader Laurence Frederick Crawley (51969).
- Acting Squadron Leader George Alfred Jeffery (58537).
- Flight Lieutenant Leslie James Anderson (43594).
- Flight Lieutenant James Anthony Henry Armstrong (51103).
- Flight Lieutenant Powell Thomas Brown (54474).
- Flight Officer Mary Agnes Clayden (4372), Women's Royal Auxiliary Air Force.
- Flight Lieutenant John William Eastham (57916).
- Flight Lieutenant Albert Henry George Grant (54427).
- Flight Lieutenant James Macintyre (171781), Royal Auxiliary Air Force Regiment.
- Flight Lieutenant John Sidney Millman (561821).
- Flight Lieutenant Erroll Minter, AFC, (201177).
- Flight Lieutenant Jan Wincenty Mondschein (500259).
- Flight Lieutenant James Albert O'Connell (54017).
- Flight Lieutenant Thomas Nelsom Forrest Orr (106832).
- Flight Lieutenant Reginald William Beecroft Rainford (82213).
- Flight Lieutenant Douglas Ferdenain Shallow (48309).
- Flight Lieutenant Bernard Smith, DFC, (42365).
- Flight Lieutenant Hector Joseph Smith, DFC, (49952).
- Flight Lieutenant Walter William Charles Snipp (53800).
- Flight Lieutenant John Campbell Grenall Wilson (142076).
- Flight Lieutenant Roy Wood (58657).
- Acting Flight Lieutenant George Shaw (63283), RAF Volunteer Reserve.
- Flying Officer Thomas William Baker (58438).
- Warrant Officer Frederick John Collis (521805).
- Warrant Officer David Angus Crombie (620747).
- Warrant Officer Walter Miles Goddard (364057).
- Warrant Officer Raymond Humphrey (566986).
- Warrant Officer George Henry Meager (506229).
- Warrant Officer William James Morris (562578).
- Warrant Officer Bertie Reginald Newman (508044).
- Warrant Officer John Thomas Norman (512791).
- Warrant Officer William Philip Roberts (591180).
- Warrant Officer Joseph Rockley (615407).
- Warrant Officer Edward Stanley Charles Saunders (562289).
- Warrant Officer William Daniel Sinclair (527631).
- Warrant Officer Ernest James Tufnail (550595).
- Warrant Officer Ronald Albert Edwin Underhill (366220).
- Warrant Officer Leonard Walker (545709).
- Warrant Officer John Waugh (536518).

Civil Division

- Penelope Loader, The Honourable Mrs. William Aitken, JP, Member of County Staff, Children, East Suffolk Women's Voluntary Services.
- Bertrand Cecil Amies, Chief Officer of Welfare Services, Dewsbury, West Riding of Yorkshire.
- Gilbert Anderson, Manager of Welding and Fabricating Department, Bruce Peebles & Co. Ltd., Edinburgh.
- Arthur William Aylett, Senior Executive Officer, Foreign Office.
- Captain Edward George Baker, Secretary, London Master Printers Association.
- William Baker, Seneschal of Sark.
- Henry Robert Ball, Calligrapher.
- James Ball, Superintendent and Deputy Chief Constable, St. Helens Borough Police Force, Lancashire.
- Francis Henry John Ballinger, Assistant Regional Food Officer, Southern and South Western Region, Ministry of Food.
- Charles Dean Barber, Honorary Secretary, Admiralty Ferry Crew Association.
- Hubert Wilfrid Barlow, Assistant Postmaster, Malvern, Worcestershire.
- Thomas Charles Battersby, General Manager, Watford Division, Eastern Gas Board.
- Harold Thomas Beer, Collector of Taxes, Higher Grade, Board of Inland Revenue.
- Ernest Alfred Bell, International Secretary, Trades Union Congress.
- Harold George Betteridge, Headmaster, Buckingham Gate Secondary School, London.
- William Joseph Beviere, Attached, War Office.
- John Birch, Assistant Railway Employment Inspector, Ministry of Transport and Civil Aviation.
- Harry Birtwistle, General Manager, Ermen and Roby Branch, and Stanhill Branch, English Sewing Cotton Co. Ltd.
- Ethel Ann Blackburn, President, Leeds Babies Welcome Association.
- David Shaw Blaikie, Technical Assistant and Clerk of Works, Ministry of Works, serving at HM Embassy, Washington.
- Ann Blumer, JP. For political and public services in Darlington.
- Richard Board, Deputy Town Clerk, Cheltenham.
- Alfred James Bolt, Senior Experimental Officer, Admiralty.
- Quintin Bone, Surveyor (Main Grade), Department of Agriculture for Scotland.
- George Arthur Booth, Superintendent, Altcar Rifle Range, West Lancashire Territorial and Auxiliary Forces Association.
- Gladys Aileen Botsford, Executive Officer, Foreign Office.
- Observer Commander George Alfred Donovan Bourne, Group Commandant, No. 5 Group, Watford, Royal Observer Corps.
- Arthur Thomas Bowden, JP, District Organiser, Bristol and North Somerset, National Union of General and Municipal Workers.
- Doris Florence Bray, Higher Executive Officer, Development Commission.
- Antonin Augustin Brejcha, Senior Technical Officer, Operations Development Unit, British Overseas Airways Corporation.
- John Brigenshaw, chairman, Bournemouth and Dorset Local Advisory Committee of the National Assistance Board.
- Stanley Walter Brown, Chief Radio Officer, SS Scythia (Cunard Steamship Co. Ltd.), International Marine Radio Co. Ltd.
- Thomas Brown, Divisional Officer, Scotland, Union of Shop, Distributive and Allied Workers.
- Catherine Ann Hamilton Bruce, Guider in Charge, Trefoil School, Hermiston, Currie, Midlothian.
- Helen Gray-Buchanan, Superintendent, Meadow Street Nursery School, Falkirk.
- William Frederick Buck, Experimental Officer, Ministry of Agriculture and Fisheries.
- Frederick James Bull, Secretary, British Dairy Farmers' Association.
- Gordon Charles Burch, Air Traffic Control Officer II, Northern Divisional Headquarters, Ministry of Transport and Civil Aviation.
- Arthur James Burden, Estate Surveyor, Prison Commission.
- Alderman Harold Burgin, chairman, Barnsley and District Disablement Advisory Committee, West Riding of Yorkshire.
- Phyllis Browne Bury, JP. For public services in Denbighshire.
- Victor Allen Buschini, RD, Skipper, ST St. Just, Fleetwood.
- Elfrida Margaret Butler, Assistant Information Officer, Central Office of Information.
- Percy Arthur Cackett, Civil Assistant to the Medical Director-General, Admiralty.
- Jack Frank Cains, Master Superintendent, Royal Army Service Corps Fleet.
- John Willie Call, Director of Public Cleansing, Bradford Corporation.
- Alexander John Campion, Senior Executive Officer, Admiralty.
- Henry James Cannon, Senior Executive Officer, Ministry of Food.
- Godfrey Joseph Challis, Senior Executive Officer, Ministry of Pensions and National Insurance.
- Ernest Charlton, lately Chief Steward, SS Queen Elizabeth, Cunard Steamship Co. Ltd.
- Jackson Sweeting Chrisp, Chief Maintenance Engineer, Consett Iron Company Ltd., County Durham.
- Robert Henry Thwaites Clarke, Manager, Lewisham Employment Exchange, Ministry of Labour and National Service.
- Kathleen Frances Claydon, Higher Executive Officer, Foreign Office.
- Mary Elizabeth Clayton. For political services in Leeds.
- Ruth Margaret Cockerton, Pictorial Publicity Officer, British Broadcasting Corporation.
- Anne Sarah Colvin, Honorary Secretary and Assistant Treasurer, International League for the Protection of Horses.
- Frank Thomas Colyer, chairman, Erith Savings Committee, Kent.
- Joseph Henry Coney, Civil Assistant and Accountant, No. 14 Maintenance Unit, Royal Air Force, Carlisle.
- Sidney Arthur Cooper, Station Engineer, Rome, British Overseas Airways Corporation.
- Bernard William Corden, MC. For services as Senior Executive Officer, Ministry of Food.
- Squadron Leader Herbert Victor Cox, Member of the Staff of the Officers' Association.
- Dorothea Florence Coxhead. For political and public services in Devon.
- Frederick Harold Crocombe, MM, District Engineer, Minehead District, Taunton-Sub-Area, South Western Electricity Board.
- William John Daines, Senior Executive Officer, Colonial Office.
- Sarah Jane Vickery Dale, managing director, Dales Coaches (Swalwell) Ltd., County Durham.
- Robina Barbour McKelvie Darroch, Principal Sister Tutor, Liverpool Royal Infirmary.
- Leonard Peter Darsley, Higher Executive Officer, Ministry of Pensions and National Insurance.
- George William Davies, Inspector of Taxes, Board of Inland Revenue.
- Mungo Murray Dewar, Administrative Assistant to the Director of Home Sound Broadcasting, British Broadcasting Corporation.
- Captain William Dinwiddie, TD, chairman, Dumfries and Galloway War Pensions Committee.
- Thomas Dodgson, Headmaster, Myrtle Park County Primary School, Bingley, Yorkshire.
- Ronald Ivanhoe Drake, Vice-chairman, Plymouth Savings Committee.
- Arthur Duggan, Conductor, Pendyrus Male Voice Choir, Glamorgan.
- Oliver Montague Proudlock-Dunbar, lately chairman, Enfield Local Employment Committee, Middlesex.
- Ethel Emily Dunn, County Secretary, West Suffolk Federation of Women's Institutes.
- Donald Dunsmore, Superintendent, Brush Electrical Engineering Co. Ltd., Loughborough, Leicestershire.
- Christina Wood Eckford. For political services.
- George Arkwright Edwards, Gauge Design Officer, Naval Ordnance Inspection Department, Admiralty.
- William Best Ellison, Head Grader and Senior Inspector of Milk Products, Ministry of Food.
- Ernest Evans, District House Coal Officer (Aberdare), House Coal Distribution (Emergency) Scheme.
- Ernest Gordon Dashwood Evans, Chief Courier, Student Welfare Department, British Council.
- Haydn Iestyn Evans, Administrative Assistant, Shell-Mex and BP Ltd.
- Donald Fairweather, Chief of Crystal Production, Marconi's Wireless Telegraph Co. Ltd.
- George Robert Farrar, MC, Staff Officer, Ministry of Education, Northern Ireland.
- Victor Robert Fenn, Chief Officer, Oxford Fire Brigade.
- Annie Ferries, Senior Nursing Sister, Royal Arsenal, Woolwich, Ministry of Supply.
- William Fielding, Senior Telecommunications Superintendent, North Eastern Region, General Post Office.
- David Peter Figgins, lately Principal, Antrim Road Primary School, Belfast.
- Charles Victor Fish, Executive Officer, Ministry of Health.
- Raymond Francis Fletcher, lately Assistant Financial Adviser, British Element, Trieste Forces.
- John Forbes, Honorary Secretary, Kintore School Savings Group, Alberdeenshire.
- William Ernest Forster, Accountant, Board of Customs and Excise.
- Alderman George Forsyth, JP, lately chairman, Tynemouth Food Control Committee, Northumberland.
- Herbert William Fox, Higher Executive Officer, War Office.
- Edwin John Franklin, Works Manager, Remploy Factory, Longton, Staffordshire.
- Eric Frith, Chief Superintendent, Metropolitan Police Force.
- Margaret Barr Fulton, Head of Occupational Therapy Department, Aberdeen Royal Mental Hospital.
- Arthur Frederick Gammon, Headquarters Inspector of Clerical Establishments, General Post Office.
- Keith Gammon. For public services in Petersfield, Hampshire.
- John Henry Gandy, Senior Executive Officer, Ministry of Pensions and National Insurance.
- James Gaskell, JP. For public services in Orrell, Lancashire.
- Walter Geary, Assistant Superintendent, Metropolitan-Vickers Electrical Co. Ltd., Manchester.
- Samuel Sturgeon Gemmell, Skipper and Owner of the motor fishing boat Stormdrift II.
- Albert George Gempton, Headmaster, Dawlish County Secondary Modern School, Devonshire.
- Gordon Robert Gentleman, Assistant Principal Clerk, Board of Inland Revenue.
- Harry Reginald George, lately Higher Executive Officer, Ministry of Transport and Civil Aviation.
- Mabel George, lately Executive Officer, Office of HM Procurator General and Treasury Solicitor.
- Alderman Robert Davies Gerrard, JP, chairman, Willenhall Local Employment Committee, Staffordshire.
- Herbert William Gill. For political services.
- Emanuel Goldberg, Higher Executive Officer, Ministry of Supply.
- William Elding Gott, Architect, Potteries Motor Traction Co. Ltd.
- Eva Gower, Executive Officer, Board of Trade.
- Thomas William Greaves, Safety Officer, Dunlop Rubber Co. Ltd., Birmingham.
- Harold Ernest Green, Principal, Malvern Technical School.
- Edward Anthony Greene, Senior Superintendent of Works, French District, Imperial War Graves Commission.
- Herbert Greig, Assistant to Commercial Superintendent, Scottish Region (Glasgow), British Railways.
- Major Charles James Grierson, TD, Secretary, The King's Regiment Old Comrades Association.
- Amy Wilhelmina Nora Griffin, Chief Superintendent of Typists, Ministry of Housing and Local Government.
- Henry Edward Gummer, Deputy Principal Officer, Ministry of Health and Local Government, Northern Ireland.
- Dora Hale, Higher Executive Officer, Ministry of Transport and Civil Aviation.
- Frederick William Thomas Hammett, Principal Production Inspector, Admiralty.
- Arthur Hankey, JP, Technical Officer, Ministry of Labour and National Service.
- Margaret Sophia Hannah, For political and public services.
- William Stewart Hare, Traffic Assistant, Leith Dock Commission.
- Percy Harris, Director and Manager, P. K. Harris & Sons Ltd., Appledore, Devonshire.
- Arthur Vincent Hart, Inspector of Taxes, Higher Grade, Board of Inland Revenue.
- Marjory Sophia Hassall. For political and public services in Cambridgeshire.
- Hilda Maude Hatchwell, Milk Production Officer, Grade II, National Agricultural Advisory Service.
- William Seward Hearder. For political services.
- Reginald Hedley, Manager, Letchworth Government Training Centre, Ministry of Labour and National Service.
- Margaret Josephine Hetherington, lately Senior Executive Officer, Department of Scientific and Industrial Research.
- Arthur Edwin Hill, Manager, Glass Works, British Thomson-Houston Co. Ltd., Chesterfield.
- James Donald Holmes, MB, CM, Admiralty Surgeon and Agent, Finchley and District, London.
- Thomas Holmes, Inspector, Newcastle, Board of Trade.
- Percy William Hopkins, Senior Executive Officer, War Office.
- Olive May Hornsby, Headmistress, Burgess Street County Primary School, Harpurhey, Manchester.
- Harry Hough, Secretary, Procter Gymnasium and Hulme Lads' Club, Manchester.
- Edgar Hugh Hudson, County Treasurer, Surrey, British Red Cross Society.
- Lydia Constance Hudson. For political and public services in Sheffield.
- Charles Hughes, JP, lately Honorary Business Manager, The College of Handicraft, Manchester.
- Cecil Lionel Hunt, Chief Clerk, J. Jefferies & Sons Ltd., Graving Dock Works, Avonmouth, Gloucestershire.
- Doris Illingworth. For political and public services.
- Fred Ivill, Senior Executive Officer, Export Credits Guarantee Department.
- Norman Morris Johns, TD, Executive Officer, Foreign Office.
- Emmie Johnstone, lately District Superintendent of Nursing Divisions, Northern Ireland, St. John Ambulance Brigade.
- Alun Morgan Jones, County Road Safety Organiser for Caernarvonshire.
- Charles Morris Jones, JP, Member of Bala Urban District Council, Merionethshire.
- George Stanley Jones, Chief Engineer, Grosvenor Chater & Co. Ltd., Abbey Paper Mills, Holywell, Flintshire.
- John Edward Jones, chairman, Sodbury District Committee, Gloucestershire Agricultural Executive Committee.
- William Alun Jones, Manager, Radford and Wollaton Unit, East Midlands Division, National Coal Board.
- Arthur Reeves Julian, Higher Executive Officer, Board of Trade.
- Captain Donald Fores Kellie, Commandant, Metropolitan Special Constabulary.
- Isabelle Kerr, JP. For political and public services in Greenock.
- Lady Margaret Mary Kerr. For social services in Edinburgh.
- Percy William Burton King, Higher Executive Officer, Air Ministry.
- Alfred Edward Knight, managing director, Alfred Knight Ltd.
- Charles William Knight, Senior Executive Officer, Ministry of Food.
- Sydney Knight, Engineer II, Royal Aircraft Establishment, Ministry of Supply.
- Cyril Clement Knowles, Works Manager, William McGeoch & Co. Ltd., Birmingham.
- The Reverend Canon Charles Compton Lanchester, chairman, Local Employment Committee, Norwich.
- Arthur Malcolm Lander, Official Receiver in Bankruptcy for the districts of Canterbury, Maidstone and Rochester.
- Ian Welsh Leebody, Deputy County Surveyor, Tyrone County Council.
- Alice Mary Leeper. For public services in County Tyrone.
- Charles John Lever, Works Manager, Siemens Brothers & Co. Ltd., West Hartlepool, and Spennymoor, County Durham.
- Lilian Frances Lewis, Experimental Officer, Meteorological Office, Air Ministry.
- Sanmugan Thuraiyan Vaithi Lingam, Chief Clerk, Base Ordnance Depot, Singapore, War Office.
- Wallace Livingstone, Head of Accounting Section, National Service Hostels Corporation Ltd.
- Charles Lodge. For political and public services in Essex.
- Willett John Lowry, Executive Officer, Victoria and Albert Museum.
- Robert Lumley, Labour Manager, John Readhead & Sons Ltd., South Shields, County Durham.
- Nellie Lund, For political and public services in Bradford.
- Norman Spinks Macauley. For services to blinded ex-servicemen in Northern Ireland.
- Alastair Macdonald, Depute City Chamberlain, Edinburgh.
- Mabel Lena Macer, Attached War Office.
- Catherine Mary Alice MacGregor, Teacher, Logie Junior Secondary School, Dundee.
- Catherine McKenna, Principal Sister, HM Prison Holloway.
- William James McKeown, District Commandant, Ulster Special Constabulary.
- Commander Donald Henry Townsend Macmillan, Royal Naval Reserve, Hydrographic Surveyor, Southampton Harbour Board.
- Hector Macpherson, Engineer II, Royal Aircraft Establishment, Ministry of Supply.
- Frank Paul Macrae, Manager of Structural Shops, Sir William Arrol & Co. Ltd., Glasgow.
- Frederic Charles Mallett. For political services in Winchester.
- Alfred Andrew Maris, Supervising Home Grown Cereals Officer, Ministry of Food.
- Frank Marriott, Works Manager, Head Wrightson Steel Foundries Ltd., Stockton-on-Tees.
- Edward Marshall, JP. Lately Chairman, Warrington Food Control Committee, Lancashire.
- George Wicks Marshall, BEM, Higher Executive Officer, Board of Trade.
- Captain Albert Frederick Martin, Master, SS Empire Shelter, Ellerman Lines Ltd.
- Alfred John Gordon Martin, Assistant Secretary, Glasgow Branch, Royal National Lifeboat Institution.
- Charles Frederick Hunter Martin, MM, Assistant Manager, Wales, Central Land Board and War Damage Commission.
- Alexander John Matheson, Chief Superintendent and Deputy Chief Constable, City of Aberdeen Police Force.
- Richard Hale Mercer, Superintendent, Belfast Mercantile Marine Office, Ministry of Transport and Civil Aviation.
- Ruth Mary Meyler, Executive Officer, Imperial War Graves Commission.
- Philippa Inez Michell. For political services in Hove.
- Benjamin Miller, Chief Engineer, HM Revenue Cruiser Vigilant, Board of Customs and Excise.
- Pattie Miller, Headmistress, Nunsthorpe County Infants' School, Grimsby.
- Alexander Milne, lately Head Forester, Maiden Bradley Estate, Wiltshire.
- Mary Elizabeth Mitford, Honorary Secretary, Shildon Savings Committee, County Durham.
- Arthur Edward Morgan, Grade 4 Officer, Ministry of Labour and National Service.
- Frank Robert Morgan, Executive Officer, Ministry of Supply.
- Sam Morgan, chairman, Llwchwr Savings Committee, Glamorganshire.
- Harold Morris, Senior Executive Officer, Ministry of Pensions and National Insurance.
- Thomas Affleck Morrison, MB, ChB, chairman, Brighton Executive Council, National Health Service.
- Charles Bruce Pitblado Morton, DSO, DFC, Assistant to the chairman, Matthew Hall & Co. Ltd.
- John Henry Mottram, Senior Executive Officer, Ministry of Health.
- Sidney Arthur Mould, chairman, Salisbury Local Employment Committee.
- Joseph Stephen Mugglestone, JP, chairman, Blackwell Rural District Savings Committee, Nottinghamshire.
- Robert Edlward Murchison, Chief Engraver, Royal Mint.
- Thomas Gerard Murray, Manager, Bristol Employment Exchange, Ministry of Labour and National Service.
- Leslie Ronald Mustill, Higher Executive Officer, Ministry of Housing and Local Government.
- Andrew Mutch, Staff Officer, Board of Inland Revenue.
- Arangasery Madhavain Nair, Clerk, Special Class, Air Ministry Audit Office, Singapore.
- Thorald Eric Naughten, Superintending Inspector, Aeronautical Inspection Service, Headquarters No. 40 Group, Royal Air Force.
- William Lionel Newton, Officer, Hull, Board of Customs and Excise.
- Elsie Nightingale. For political and public services in Newton-le-Willows.
- William Frederick Offord, Member, Sussex District Advisory Committee, London and South Eastern Regional Board for Industry.
- Stanley Richard O'Hanlon, Senior Executive Officer, Ministry of Agriculture and Fisheries.
- Frederick Henry Owles, Senior Draughtsman, Home Counties Region, General Post Office.
- Herbert Leslie Pace, Senior Experimental Officer, Meteorological Office, Air Ministry.
- Florence May Paterson, Personal Assistant to the Secretary of the National Trust.
- Frederick Henry Paul, lately Senior Certifying Officer, West Midland Traffic Area, Ministry of Transport and Civil Aviation.
- James Gamlin Paul, Senior Executive Officer, National Assistance Board.
- Cyril John Payne, MM, Grade 3 Officer, Ministry of Labour and National Service.
- Bertram Spencer Pears, Production Manager, Imperial Typewriter Company Ltd., Leicester.
- Gladys May Pearson, Matron, Stapleton Hospital, Bristol.
- William Richard Peatling, Apprentice Supervisor, Telegraph Construction & Maintenance Co. Ltd., Greenwich.
- Hubert Leslie Peddle, Signals Officer, Telecommunications Department, Ministry of Transport and Civil Aviation.
- Sidney Russell Peek, Base Engineer, Stratocruiser and Constellation Fleet, British Overseas Airways Corporation.
- Colonel Harold Peploe, DSO, Consultant to Director of Ordnance Factories, Ministry of Supply.
- Reginald Peppitt, Headmaster, Linden Lodge Blind School, Wandsworth Common, London.
- Frederick Stanley Perry, Assistant Manager, English Steel Corporation Ltd., Sheffield.
- Frederick Jack Pewtner, Chief Designer, E.N.V. Engineering Co. Ltd., Willesden.
- Ernest Edward Pheasey, Works Manager, Foster, Yates & Thorn Ltd., Blackburn, Lancashire.
- Edward William Phillips, managing director, Air Schools Ltd., Derby.
- Moss Joan Phillips, For political and public services in Hammersmith.
- Philip Phillips, Civil Assistant, Royal Naval Air Repair Yard, Fleetlands, Hampshire.
- William Edward Phillips, Chief Draughtsman, Harland & Wolff Ltd., Bootle, Lancashire.
- Arthur Frederick Piper, Manager, Land Settlement Association Estate, Newent, Gloucestershire.
- Jack Hubert Pitts, JP, chairman, Plymouth and District War Pensions Committee.
- Arthur Stuart Pointing, Assistant Chief Constable, Somerset Constabulary.
- Robert William Porter, Director, Eastern Federation of Building Trades Employers.
- James Rankin, 3rd Engineer, ST Southern Opal, Chr. Salvesen & Co.
- Herbert James Ray, Higher Executive Officer, Ministry of Transport and Civil Aviation.
- Muriel Frances Read, County Borough Organiser, Hull, Women's Voluntary Services.
- Walter Samuel Read, Manager, Fraser & Chalmers Engineering Works, Erith, Kent.
- Geoffrey William Frederick Reburn, Senior Committee Clerk, Plymouth City Corporation.
- Minnie Gertrude Reed. For political and public services in Devizes.
- William John Rowe Richards, Deputy Superintendent, Directorate-General of Works, Air Ministry.
- Marion Agnes Richardson, Higher Executive Officer, Board of Trade.
- Saraih Elizabeth Roberts, District Nurse Midwife, Portmadoc, Caernarvonshire.
- Alderman. Walter Roberts. For public services in Shropshire.
- Robert Arthur Rogers, Executive Officer, British Museum.
- Margaret Shearer Ross, Matron, Rhives House Old People's Home, Golspie, Sutherland.
- Matthew Russell, Chief Engineer, Cerebos Group of Companies, Middlewich Salt Co. Ltd., Cheshire.
- Joseph Frederick Rust, General Manager and Engineer, Newport Undertaking, Wales Gas Board.
- Arthur Reginald Salmon, Departmental Chief Executive Officer, Eastern Region, Ministry of Fuel and Power.
- John Jacob Sarche, Chief Inspector, Ultra Electric Ltd., Acton.
- Edward Henry Scott, First Class Clerk, Admiralty Registry, Supreme Court of Judicature.
- Margaret Macdonald Scott. For services as District Administrator for South-East District of Scotland, Women's Voluntary Services.
- Nicholas Thomas Sekers, managing director, West Cumberland Silk Mills Ltd.
- Elsie Marguerite Seymour, Assistant, Newsroom, British Broadcasting Corporation.
- Ida Mirrielees Seymour, LRCP, LRCS(Ed), lately Medical Officer, Department of Health for Scotland.
- Elizabeth Averil, Lady Shakerley. For political and public services in Sussex.
- Ernest Edward Shatford. For political services.
- William Edward Shaw, Deputy Works Manager, Charlton Factory, United Glass Bottle Manufacturers Ltd., London.
- Albert George Short, Assistant Regional Director (Building Industries), Ministry of Works.
- Ethel Simmons, Honorary Divisional Secretary, Watford, Hertfordshire, Soldiers' Sailors' and Airmen's Families Association.
- Ernest Keener Simpson, Chief Engineer, MV Highland Prince, Prince Line Ltd.
- Grace Mabel Agnes Simpson, Health Visitor, Camberwell and Lewisham.
- Jane Taylor Simpson, Senior Clerk, Lanarkshire, Sheriff Clerk Service.
- Edward Thomas Slater, Vice-chairman, Carmarthenshire Blind Society.
- Robert Slater, JP, lately Provost of Kirkwall, Orkney.
- William Small. For services to journalism in Wolverhampton.
- Albert Edward Smith, Senior Executive Officer, Ministry of Fuel and Power.
- Arthur George Smith, Higher Executive Officer, Enfield Factory, General Post Office.
- Bertram Stanley Smith, Divisional Potato Supervisor, Ministry of Food.
- Constance Lilian Sidney-Smith, Principal School of Stitchery and Lace, Bookham, Surrey.
- Frank Edward Ernest Smith, Member of the Scientific Staff, Medical Research Council.
- Frederick Stewart Smith, JP, chairman, Southampton, Isle of Wight, Winchester and District War Pensions Committee.
- Samuel Smyth, District Inspector, Royal Ulster Constabulary.
- Joseph Reginald Sockett, Surveyor and Engineer, Atcham Rural District Council, Shrewsbury, Salop.
- William James Lovell Solly, Higher Clerical Officer, Ministry of Defence.
- Herbert Speck, Honorary Secretary, Swindon Savings Committee, Wiltshire.
- Charles Paul Spencer, chairman, Nottingham Branch, National Federation of Building Trades Operatives.
- Raymond Spencer, Engineer, Newark Area Internal Drainage Board.
- Mary Teresa Spens, lately Headquarters Field Officer, Gold Coast, British Red Cross Society.
- George Roberts Stainer, Male Charge Nurse, Lewisham Hospital, London.
- The Reverend Canon John Mortimer Duniam Stancomb, Honorary Chaplain to the Bristol Special Constabulary.
- James Stanger, Senior Executive Officer, Ministry of Transport and Civil Aviation.
- William Thomas James Stead, Honorary Secretary, No. 148 (Barnsley) Squadron Committee, Air Training Corps.
- Francis Holden Steele, Senior Executive Officer, Ministry of Works.
- Marguerite Barbara Stiles, Clerical Officer, Office of the Public Trustee.
- Amelia Louisa Storey. For political and public services in Newcastle upon Tyne.
- Alice Kezia Street, chairman and Founder, London Flower Lovers' League.
- The Reverend John William Stutt, lately Superintendent, North Belfast Mission, Belfast.
- Alderman William Herbert Summer, JP, chairman, Welton District Committee, Lincolnshire (Lindsey) Agricultural Executive Committee.
- Joseph Swales, MC, President of the Cleveland and South Durham Institute for the Blind, Middlesbrough.
- John Douglas Swanson, Senior Map Curator, War Office.
- William Robert Taylor, Senior Executive Officer, Ministry of Pensions and National Insurance.
- William Frederick Terkelsen, Chief Officer, Grade I, Drainage and Water Supplies, Agricultural Executive Committee, Essex.
- Elizabeth Snelgrove Thompson, Senior Executive Officer, Ministry of Pensions and National Insurance.
- Herbert James Thompson, Manager for Inclusive Traffic, Thomas Cook & Son Ltd.
- Reginald Thompson, Secretary, Joint Council of British Potato and Vegetable Merchants Associations.
- Edith Mary Thomson, Higher Clerical Officer, Telephone Manager's Office, Aberdeen.
- Harry Downie Thomson, Managing Secretary, Methil Co-operative Society, Fifeshire.
- Annie Elizabeth Thornley, Matron, Jersey Maternity Hospital.
- Bertie Maurice Thurbon, Supervisor, East Africa, Navy, Army and Air Force Institutes.
- Stanley Alfred Tilley, Senior Executive Officer, Civil Service Commission.
- Jack Edwin Timmings. For political and public services in Wandsworth.
- Herbert Eric Toogood, Assistant Engineering Manager, Humber St. Andrew's Engineering Co. Ltd., Hull.
- Ernest Clifford Townend, Alderman, City of Winchester.
- Louise Adele Tucker, assistant director, Youth and Junior training, Somerset, British Red Cross Society.
- Arthur George Tunnell, chairman, National Insurance Local Advisory Committee, Guildford.
- Albert Henry Joseph Turner, Assistant, Freight Rolling Stock, British Transport Commission.
- Lieutenant-Colonel Archibald Frank St. Aubyn Turner, Retired Officer, War Office.
- Arthur Reginald Turner, Secretary, Hull Corn Trade Association Ltd.
- Dorothy Olive Turpin. For political and public services in Denbighshire.
- Percival James Uffen, Senior Executive Officer, Ministry of Pensions and National Insurance.
- Mary Isabelle Urquhart. For political services in Grimsby.
- Major Thomas Henry Vile, JP. For public services in Monmouthshire.
- Hilda Wagstaff, Senior Executive Officer, Board of Trade.
- Maurice Joseph Walsh, Secretary, Finance and Supplies Officer, Knowle Hospital Management Committee, Hampshire.
- Raymond Henry Walter, Higher Clerical Officer, HM Treasury.
- Samuel Waring, DCM, lately Commandant, Ulster Regiment, Church Lads' Brigade.
- Henry Emil Wasser, Chief Testing Engineer, Midlands Division, British Electricity Authority.
- Edward Samuel Watkins, assistant director of Contracts, HM Stationery Office.
- Thomas Albert Watson, lately Operating Superintendent, Meat Transport Organisation Ltd.
- Eric Gordon Charles Weatherley, Senior Information Service Clerk in the Library of the House of Commons.
- Ernest Arthur Whalley, Assistant Principal Clerk, Board of Inland Revenue.
- John Eric Whitaker, Chief Officer, Walsall Fire Brigade.
- Thomas Whiting, Group Engineer, Northern (Northumberland and Cumberland), Division National Coal Board.
- Arthur Walden Whittaker, Senior Executive Engineer, London Telecommunications Region, General Post Office.
- Mabel Williams, JP, Sister, Calderstones Mental Hospital, Whalley, Blackburn, Lancashire.
- William Williams, lately Member, Caernarvonshire Agricultural Executive Committee.
- Henry Charles Wills, Factory Foreman, Hodges & Sons (Clothiers) Ltd., Fforestfach, Swansea.
- Helen Jessie Eardley-Wilmot, Honorary Secretary, East Grinstead Citizens Advice Bureau, Sussex.
- Albert Edwin Wilson, Senior Executive Officer, Ministry of Pensions and National Insurance.
- Robert Wilson. For services to the British Legion in Londonderry.
- Frank Wood, Works Manager, Turner Brothers Asbestos Co. Ltd., Hindley Green.
- Harry Francis Wood, JP, chairman, City of Stoke-on-Trent Savings Committee, Staffordshire.
- Elisabeth Hyatt-Woolf, chairman, Tonbridge Rural District Council, Kent.
- Allister Robert George Wray, Chief Officer, Birkenhead Fire Brigade.
- Arthur Nichols Wright, JP, chairman, National Insurance Local Advisory Committee, Norwich.
- Jessie Arabella Wright, Sister in Charge, Casualty and Outpatients Departments, Kent and Canterbury Hospital.
- Joseph Leslie Wright, Higher Executive Officer, Ministry of Pensions and National Insurance.
- John Yates, Senior. Executive Officer, Ministry of Food.
- Constance Ivy Young, Executive Officer, Commonwealth Relations Office.
- Frank Sidney Yuill, Senior Executive Officer, Air Ministry.
- Stanley Charles Bennett, Senior Control Officer, Frontier Inspection Service, Control Commission for Germany (British Element).
- Walter George Cook, Senior Control Officer, Cultural Relations Branch, Control Commission for Germany (British Element).
- Fred Leslie Cooper, Deputy Secretary, Sudan Government Agency in London.
- Ursula Frances Yorke Coulson, Personal Assistant to Her Majesty's Ambassador in Cairo.
- Jane Evans, Medical Missionary in Egypt.
- Margaret Faraday Evans, Headmistress of San Silvestre College, Lima.
- Manuel Salvador Gomez, British Vice-Consul at La Linea.
- Ivy Lina (Jane) Grant, Shorthand typist at Her Majesty's Embassy in Djakarta.
- The Reverend William Popham Hosford, RD, Anglican Rural Dean of the Netherlands.
- John Hare Park Jennings, British subject resident in France.
- Robert Charles Johnston, British Vice-Consul at Port Limón.
- Gwendolen Muriel Kidd, Librarian at Her Majesty's Embassy in Washington.
- George Thomas Nixon, managing director in the Western Hemisphere of John Henderson (Curasao) & Co. Ltd., Curaçao.
- Philip Hugh Clive Pawson, Inspector, Local Government Branch, Sudan Government.
- Stanley Dutton-Pegram, British Vice-Consul at Torreón.
- Harold Curtis Perkins, Director of the Institute of the Asociacion Argentina de Cultura Inglesa, Santa Fe.
- Jane Bain Rosie, Headmistress of the Tabeetha School, Tel Aviv.
- Florence Mary Shackshaft, Matron of the Anglo-American Hospital, Cairo.
- Hugh Peter Sherman, District Commissioner, Khartoum North, Sudan.
- Henry Allen Smith, Her Majesty's Vice-Consul at Tangier.
- Robert John Stewart Thomson, District Commissioner, Southern Darfur, Sudan.
- William Henry Traill, Senior Temporary Assistant, Control Commission for Germany (British Element).
- William Leslie Tyson, Senior Temporary Officer Grade III at Her Majesty's Embassy in Washington.
- Margaret Walker, Secretary to the British Council Representative in Amsterdam.
- Cissie Weale, British subject resident in Greece.
- Peter Blanche Williamson, British subject resident in Cuba.
- Harold William Wort, Grade II Officer, Office of the Commissioner-General for Her Majesty's Government in the United Kingdom in South East Asia.
- Charles Martin Austin, Mayor of Fort Victoria, Southern Rhodesia.
- Percy Barker. For services to the Industrial Council of the Mining Industry, and to the Silicosis Board, Southern Rhodesia.
- Paulin Frederick Barrett, Secretary, Interim Public Service Commission, Federation of Rhodesia and Nyasaland.
- Alderman Collin Hamilton Bell, of Gatooma, Southern Rhodesia. For municipal services.
- Ethne Elenor Bernard, a Clerk in the Secretariat, Bechuanaland Protectorate.
- Maxwell Mackie Buchan, JP, of Gatooma, Southern Rhodesia. For public services.
- Olive Mabel Calvert, JP. For social welfare services in the State of Tasmania.
- Menai Campbell, Lady District Superintendent of the St. John Ambulance Association in Calcutta, India.
- Comninos Xenophon Comninos. For public services in Southern Rhodesia.
- Ernest William Dearman. For services to local government bodies in the Lobethal District, State of South Australia.
- Ronald Adrian Griffiths. For services to the Ministry of Finance, Federation of Rhodesia and Nyasaland.
- Francis Leslie Hadfield. For public services in Southern Rhodesia.
- Alan Izod, producer of the Central African Film Unit, Federation of Rhodesia and Nyasaland.
- Constance Cecily McGrath, Principal, Women Police, State of South Australia.
- Brenda Murch, Matron, Athlone Hospital, Lobatsi, Bechuanaland Protectorate.
- John Charles Paice, JP, a District Coroner, and President of the Justices' Association, North West Coast, State of Tasmania.
- Douglas Robert Plaister, Honorary Secretary of the Branch of the Royal Life Saving Society in the State of Tasmania.
- Catherine Roux, a Maternity Nurse, of Bulawayo, Southern Rhodesia.
- John Harold West, Statistician, Central African Statistical Office, Federation of Rhodesia and Nyasaland.
- Waliam John Williams. For services to the community on Eyre Peninsula, particularly in the District of Streaky Bay, State of South Australia.
- The Reverend Eric John Martin Wyld, Principal and Chaplain, St. George's School and Orphanage, Madras, India.
- Victor de Vere Allen, Superintendent of Prisons, Kenya.
- Valdemar Jens Andersen, District Commissioner, Western Pacific High Commission.
- Walter Reginald Nahum Andrews, Senior Executive Officer, Colonial Secretariat, Hong Kong.
- Pious Anthony, Labour Inspector, Federation of Nigeria.
- Frank Barnett, lately Executive Officer, Transport, Department of Trade, Transport and Industry, Northern Rhodesia.
- The Reverend Harold George Beckwith. For services to Education in Uganda.
- Margaret Laurie Belcher, JP, Social Welfare Officer, Eastern Region, Nigeria.
- Captain Hugh Fitzherbert Bloxham, JP. For public services in the Federation of Malaya.
- Paul Agyeman Boatin, Private Secretary to the Asantehene, Gold Coast.
- Fanny Ebun Boyle. For services to Education in the Eastern Region, Nigeria.
- Arthur Lyndall Brown, Chief Draughtsman, Department of Surveys and Land, Northern Rhodesia.
- Frank Howard Sudden, MB, BS, Medical Officer (Ophthalmology), Northern Region, Nigeria.
- Douglas Victor Bunting, District Traffic Superintendent, East African Railways and Harbours.
- Alfred Charles Ernest Callan, Inspector of Produce, Zanzibar.
- Lily Ann Carrara. For public services in Gibraltar.
- Sowande Henry St. Edward Robbin-Coker, Chief Dispenser, Medical Department, Sierra Leone.
- Homersham Felton Cox, Senior Accountant, Nyasaland.
- Joseph Clement Dalais. For public services in Mauritius.
- Seiyid Muhammad Darwish. For services to the Government in the Western Aden Protectorate.
- Jean de Verteuil. For public services in Trinidad.
- Joseph Antoine Max de Verteuil, Senior Warden, Trinidad.
- Nicholas Probert Downing. For services to HM Forces in Malta.
- Francis Vivian Dunstan, JP. For public services in Fiji.
- Maria Leonora Du Toit. For medical services in the Tiv Division, Northern Region, Nigeria.
- Enosi Ejoku, Secretary-General, Teso District Council, Uganda.
- Lazarus Udo Ekpo, Secretary, Abak County Council, Eastern Region, Nigeria.
- Frederick Thomas Ephraums, Architect and Building Surveyor, Rural Board, Singapore.
- Eyo Ekpenyong Eyo, Nursing Superintendent, Federation of Nigeria.
- Henry Vincent Eyre, Senior Health Superintendent, Makurdi, Northern Region, Nigeria.
- Pastor Norman Asprey Ferris. For public services in Pitcairn island.
- Ethelwynne Downing Fisher. For public services in Northern Rhodesia.
- Graham Gamble, Agricultural Officer, Kenya.
- Michael Ashley Gimson, Field Officer, Tsetse Control Department, Uganda.
- Goh Hoon Seng, Superintendent, Waste Detection, Singapore City Council.
- Ramasamy Govindasamy, Assistant Official Assignee, Sessions Court, Ipoh, Federation of Malaya.
- James Wallace Graham, Superintendent of Works, Public Works Department, Kenya.
- Marjorie Beatrice Greenland, Superintendent, St. Barnabas School for the Blind, Nicosia, Cyprus.
- Harold James Grey, lately Senior Agricultural Supervisor, Department of Agriculture and Forestry, St. Helena.
- Mallam Gwamna, Chief of the Kagoro Independent District, Northern Region, Nigeria.
- Mallam Umaru Gwandu, Clerk of the Northern House of Assembly, Northern Region, Nigeria.
- Henry Washington Halstead, Engineer (Radio), Posts and Telegraphs Department, Fiji.
- George Nathaniel Hamilton, lately Senior Surveyor, Posts and Telegraphs Department, Federation of Nigeria.
- George Norman Hampson, District Officer, Kenya.
- Florence Maud Harmer, Nursing Sister, Northern Region, Nigeria.
- Agnes Swann McGarvey Hawkins, Supervisor of Elections, Penang, Federation of Malaya.
- William Haythornthwaite. For public services in the Gambia.
- Gwendolen Emily Mary Hill. For social services in the Federation of Malaya.
- Ho Chung Chung, Principal, True Light School, Hong Kong.
- Robert Hunter, Principal, Highlands School, Eldoret, Kenya.
- Ivy Hvidt. For public services in Tanganyika.
- Charlotte Quashie-Idun. For public services in the Gold Coast.
- Mallam Jonathan Yahaya Inusa, Government Supervisory Teacher, Northern Region, Nigeria.
- Sultan Jabil bin Hussein, Representative of the Audhali Sultan, Aden Protectorate.
- Mohamedali Sharif Jiwa. For public services, in Tanganyika.
- Eric Ronald Johnson, Assistant Adviser, North Eastern Area, Aden Protectorate.
- Arthur Ranjit Julumsingh, Pay and Quartermaster, Police Department, Trinidad.
- Ebenezer Eliab Alexander Kattell, Administrative Assistant, Federation of Nigeria.
- Alice Kerridge. For public services in North Borneo.
- Dennis Kirby, District Commissioner, Sierra Leone.
- Paramount Chief Francis Kposowa, Bumpe Chiefdom, Bo District, Sierra Leone.
- Mallam Dauda Haruna Kwoi, Adult Education Supervisor, Southern Zaria, Northern Region, Nigeria.
- The Venerable Roger George Patrick Lamburn, Archdeacon of the Diocese of Masasi, Tanganyika.
- Edith Ada Leeming. For nursing services in the Western Region, Nigeria.
- Derek North Lewis, Livestock Officer, Veterinary Department, Kenya.
- Li Wing Sum, Clerk, Government Records Office, Hong Kong.
- Eva Constance Lowe, Chief Nursing Supervisor (Public Health), Jamaica.
- Saulo Lubega. For services to Education in Uganda.
- John Barker Avis McFarlane, Administrative Assistant, Colonial Secretary's Office, Jamaica.
- Ruby MacGregor. For services to music in British Guiana.
- Alexander Stewart McKinnon, assistant director of Agriculture and Veterinary Services, Somaliland.
- Kenneth John Ramsay Maclennan, Veterinary Officer, Northern Region, Nigeria.
- Louis Joseph Claude Maingard, Assistant Secretary, Colonial Secretariat, Mauritius.
- Major Clifford Melhado. For public services in Jamaica.
- Catherine Paton Moir. For services to Education in the Gold Coast.
- Fernand Albert Morel, Superintendent of Prisons, Seychelles.
- Charles Vincent Mtawali, African Assistant Medical Officer, Tanganyika.
- Teresa Ntale binti Gwasa, Chieftainess of Kasulu, Tanganyika.
- Effiong Offiong Eniang Offiong. For services to Education in the Eastern Region, Nigeria.
- Emmanuel Abiodun Ogunbiyi. For public and social services in the Eastern Region, Nigeria.
- Ong Eng Lian. For public services in Singapore.
- Joseph Okodike Onwuka, Assistant Superintendent of Prisons, Federation of Nigeria.
- Pang Pui Kwan, Chief Clerk, Public Works Department Sub-Treasury, Singapore.
- Jashhai Chhotavahai Patel. For public services in Uganda.
- John Paterson, For missionary services and agricultural work in the Eastern Region, Nigeria.
- The Reverend Jacobus Cornelius Christoff Pauw. For public services in Northern Rhodesia.
- Owen Napier Denbigh Phillips, Assistant Conservator of Forests, British Honduras.
- Frederick William James Plucknett, Government Storekeeper, Fiji.
- Leslie Francis Gordon Pritchard, Private Secretary to the Governor and Commander-and-Chief, Kenya.
- Herman Pyfrom, Labour Officer, Bahamas.
- Haji Abdul Rahman bin Haji Osman, JP. For public services in the Federation of Malaya.
- Maduranayagam Rajaratnam, Assistant Registrar of Co-operative Societies, Federation of Malaya.
- Mehmet Raouf. For professional and social services in Cyprus.
- Melvile John Rattray, City Engineer, Georgetown Municipality, British Guiana.
- Thomas Hughes Rice, Senior Assistant Agricultural Officer, Kenya.
- Percy Richards, Locomotive Instructor, East African Railways and Harbours.
- Helen Margaret Roberts, lately Regional Director, British Council, Eastern Region, Nigeria.
- Harman Seymour Sainsbury, Assistant Comptroller of Customs, Barbados.
- Sinnathamby Selvadoray, Assessment Officer, Department of Inland Revenue, Federation of Malaya.
- Freda Mary Sennitt. For nursing services in the Eastern Region, Nigeria.
- The Reverend John Robert Shaw. For public services in Northern Rhodesia.
- Daniel Powell Turner-Shaw, Administrative Assistant, Medical Department, Lagos, Nigeria.
- Elizabeth Ellen Simmons. For nursing services in Nyasaland.
- Warrington Howard Lloyd Simmons. For services to sport in Bermuda.
- John Skinner, Superintendent Radiographer, Medical Department, Hong Kong.
- Arthur Charles Small, TD, District Commissioner, Kenya.
- Nicolaos Demetriou Solomonides. For public services in Cyprus.
- Malbel Felicia Sprott. For public services in St. Vincent, Windward Islands.
- Martin Samuel Staveley, Secretary, Development and Welfare Organisation, West Indies.
- Douglas Swannie, Broadcasting Officer, Tanganyika.
- Emmanuel Tagoe. For services to Education in the Gold Coast.
- Helen Talbot. For public services in Bermuda.
- Ethel Gertrude Taylor, Member, Malayan Relief Teams, St. John's Ambulance Brigade, Federation of Malaya.
- Caroline Harriet Thomas, Headmistress, Holy Trinity Infants School, Sierra Leone.
- Dudley Clarke Todd, Inspector of Works, Montserrat, Leeward Islands.
- Clarita Katherine Toote. For public and social services in the Bahamas.
- Gordon Garth Van Hien. For services to Music in Singapore.
- John William Vincent, Senior Executive Officer, Office of the Crown Agents for Oversea Governments and Administrations.
- Louis Joseph Victor Westergreen, Chief Storekeeper, Public Works Department, Seychelles.
- Eleanor Mary Wilkin, Administrative Assistant, Tanganyika.
- Ethel Marguerite Williams. For public services in Northern Rhodesia.
- Horatio Wilson, Acting Assistant Accountant-General, Singapore.
- Violet Constance Young, Assistant to the East African Commissioner, East African Office in London.

Honorary Members

- Chunilal Manekchand Seth, JP. For public services in the Federation of Malaya.
- Zainal Abidin bin Endot, Assistant District Officer, Kuala Pilah, Negri Sembilan, Federation of Malaya.
- Siang Thian See. For public services in the Federation of Malaya.
- Teo Peng Kai. For public services in the Federation of Malaya.

=== Order of the Companions of Honour (CH) ===
- Captain The Right Honourable Harry Frederick Comfort Crookshank, MP, Lord Privy Seal since 1952 and Leader of the House of Commons since 1951. Minister of Health, 1951–1952; Postmaster-General, 1943–1945; Financial Secretary to the Treasury, 1939–1943. Member of Parliament for Gainsborough since 1924.
- The Reverend Hugh Martin. For services to the National Free Church Federal Council and to the British Council of Churches.

=== British Empire Medal (BEM) ===
Military Division

Royal Navy

- Chief Aircraft Artificer Percy Stanley Allen, L/FX.76071.
- Chief Radio Electrical Artificer William George Andrews, D/MX.51641.
- Chief Electrician John Atter, P/MX.759104.
- Chief Petty Officer Telegraphist James Charles Black, DSM, P/JX.132430.
- Chief Ordnance Artificer Eric Malcolm Bloomfield, D/MX.55269.
- Chief Yeoman of Signals Alfred Clarke, DSM, C/ JX.142022.
- Chief Petty Officer Stoker Mechanic Albert Edward Armistice Coomber, C/KX.90454.
- Chief Petty Officer Wallace Legood Cubitt, C/JX.126799.
- Petty Officer Gerald Vincent Daly, D/JX.125170.
- Chief Wren (Welfare) Irene Elizabeth David, 88515. Women's Royal Naval Service.
- Chief Petty Officer Writer Thomas Fraser Dunbar, D/MX.49426.
- Aircraft Mechanician 1st Class Dennis Leslie Franks, L/FX.588897.
- Staff Bandmaster William Charles Greasley, RMB/X.414, Royal Marines.
- Chief Aircraft Artificer William Arthur Harmer, L/FX.76963.
- Constance Marion Johnson, lately V.A.D. Nursing Member.
- Quartermaster Sergeant (C) Douglas Joy, Ch.X.1181, Royal Marines.
- Chief Petty Officer James Kennedy, P/JX.134068.
- Chief Airman David Lewis, L/FX.882020.
- Sick Berth Chief Petty Officer James Charles McKenzie, D/MX.54449.
- Chief Petty Officer Melan bin Suradi, S/J.3, Royal Malayan Navy.
- Master-at-Arms Charles Augustus Mist, P/M.40249.
- Chief Petty Officer Steward Augustus Moore, P/LX.21694.
- Chief Petty Officer Writer Graham Edwin Morgan, P/MX.52813.
- Quartermaster Sergeant Thomas Walter Augustine Pedrick, Ply.X.2281, Royal Marines.
- Chief Petty Officer Cook(s) Henry George Piddell, P/MX.47256.
- Chief Engine Room Artificer Eric Simon Rea, C/MX.49521.
- Chief Engine Room Artificer Frank Percival Reed, D/MX.52390.
- Chief Wren (Pay) Lily Roper, 32295, Women's Royal Naval Service.
- Chief Petty Officer Robert Williams, C/J.9588.
- Chief Electrician Stephen Wilmshurst, P/MX.844470.
- Chief Petty Officer Writer Frederick Arthur Woodgate, D/MX.51074.

Army

- WI/733 Warrant Officer Class II (acting) Robert Edward Allen, The Jamaica Battalion,
- 4688748 Colour-Sergeant Wilfred Axon, Coldstream Guards.
- 19060709 Warrant Officer Class II (acting) William Russell Bailes, Royal Army Ordnance Corps.
- 22282883 Sergeant Robert Barr, Corps of Royal Engineers, Territorial Army.
- 21012209 Colour-Sergeant Benjamin Beards, The South Staffordshire Regiment, Territorial Army.
- 2071162 Staff-Sergeant Lawrence Beck, Corps of Royal Engineers.
- 22304428 Sergeant Arthur John Beckingham, Royal Regiment of Artillery, Territorial Army.
- 14441303 Staff-Sergeant Aubrey Charles Buckles, Intelligence Corps.
- 22252573 Battery-Quartermaster-Sergeant Ronald Clement Cary, Royal Regiment of Artillery, Territorial Army.
- 850586 Warrant Officer Class II (acting) Norman Copcutt, Royal Regiment of Artillery.
- 22204172 Staff-Sergeant Raymond Thomas Dallen, Royal Army Ordnance Corps.
- 1877365 Sergeant Joseph Terence Dalton, Corps of Royal Engineers.
- W/101438 Staff-Sergeant Kathleen Nora Dicker, Women's Royal Army Corps.
- 863396 Artisan Sergeant Edward James Draper, Corps of Royal Electrical and Mechanical Engineers.
- 833259 Warrant Officer Class II (acting) (now substantive) John Drynan, Royal Regiment of Artillery.
- W/4152 Sergeant (acting) Mary Bannerman Elrick, Women's Royal Army Corps.
- T/22520835 Company Quartermaster-Sergeant Cecil Donald Evans, Royal Army Service Corps, Territorial Army.
- S/2086542 Warrant Officer Class II (acting) Herbert Alfred George Fletcher, Royal Army Service Corps.
- 7021333 Staff-Sergeant (acting) Percy Alfred Francis, Intelligence Corps.
- NA/29591 Regimental-Sergeant-Major Ibrahim Funtua, The Nigeria Regiment, Royal West African Frontier Force.
- Warrant Officer Garnett, The King's African Rifles.
- 4342339 Staff-Sergeant (acting) John Thomas Hedley, Royal Army Ordnance Corps.
- 733198 Sergeant Daniel Tyson Holmes, Royal Regiment of Artillery, Territorial Army.
- W/32239 Sergeant Mary Elizabeth Honeybone, Women's Royal Army Corps.
- 22224421 Staff-Sergeant (acting) Thomas Jeory, Royal Army Medical Corps.
- 2327980 Sergeant William Edward King, Royal Corps of Signals.
- GC/12496 Regimental-Sergeant-Major Ali Lagos, The Gold Coast Regiment, Royal West African Frontier Force.
- HK/18022024 Warrant Officer Class II (acting) Lam Fat, General Service Corps.
- 2610508 Colour-Sergeant (acting) Thomas Arthur William Leach, Grenadier Guards.
- Regimental-Sergeant-Major Robert Manisa, Bechuanaland Protectorate Police.
- 5508373 Colour-Sergeant Leslie Marshall, The Queen's Own Royal West Kent Regiment.
- 2585866 Sergeant Ronald Douglas McMurray, Royal Corps of Signals.
- 22219390 Colour-Sergeant William Henry Morris, The Royal Welch Fusiliers, Territorial Army.
- 14326512 Squadron-Quartermaster-Sergeant (acting) Angus Morrison, Royal Corps of Signals.
- W/262507 Staff-Sergeant (acting) Jean Balderston Mounsor, Women's Royal Army Corps.
- S/14433679 Staff-Sergeant William Walter John Nicolls, Royal Army Service Corps.
- 7782518 Sergeant John Francis Nichols, The Royal Ulster Rifles, Territorial Army.
- 6007331 Sergeant Robert William Nunn, Army Catering Corps.
- 22227158 Sergeant Leslie Percival, Royal Army Pay Corps, Territorial Army (attached The Wiltshire Regiment (Duke of Edinburgh's), Territorial Army).
- Corporal Ekanaiga Simon Pereira, Singapore Military Forces.
- 10596505 Warrant Officer Class II (acting) Norman Priestley, Royal Army Ordnance Corps.
- 22304002 Sergeant (Local Warrant Officer Class II) John Harrison Richards, Royal Regiment of Artillery.
- 22235642 Squadron-Quartermaster-Sergeant William Norbert Rimmer, Corps of Royal Engineers, Territorial Army.
- 11566 Bombardier (Gun Fitter) Joseph Mary Sammut, Royal Malta Artillery.
- 1152411 Warrant Officer Glass II (acting) William Spencer, Royal Regiment of Artillery.
- 777467 Sergeant (acting) George Stephens, Royal Regiment of Artillery.
- 7880275 Warrant Officer Class II (acting) Cyril Frederick Stocks, Royal Tank Regiment, Royal Armoured Corps.
- S/22247598 Staff-Sergeant James Henry Sutherland, Royad Army Service Corps.
- 7883158 Warrant Officer Class II (acting) (now substantive) William George Tosdevine, Royal Armoured Corps.
- 834851 Warrant Officer Class II (acting) Eric Wicks, Royal Regiment of Artillery.
- 11006230 Warrant Officer Class (acting) George Leonard Wilkinson, Royal Regiment of Artillery.
- 22564258 Sergeant George Baillie Williamson, Corps of Royal Electrical and Mechanical Engineers, Territorial Army.
- S/5886463 Staff-Sergeant Charles Wilson, Royal Army Service Corps, Territorial Army.
- GC/14824 Regimental-Sergeant-Major Kramo Wongara, The Gold Coast Regiment, Royal West African Frontier Force.

Royal Air Force

- 507857 Flight Sergeant William Montague Clark.
- 566219 Flight Sergeant Richard Nathaniel Dickinson.
- 645197 Flight Sergeant (now Acting Warrant Officer) Lawrence Earnshaw.
- 539833 Flight Sergeant George Alfred Eccles.
- 540603 Flight Sergeant Frank Elston.
- 908203 Flight Sergeant Arthur Edward Goulding.
- 521703 Flight Sergeant Sydney Harry Julius Hammond.
- 562137 Flight Sergeant Ronald Harvey.
- 564872 Flight Sergeant Roland Toogood Jeffery.
- 529041 Flight Sergeant Ronald Langton.
- 2684515 Flight Sergeant Alexander Oswald James Laughton, Royal Auxiliary Air Force.
- 908908 Flight Sergeant William Patrick McCormack.
- 528731 Flight Sergeant Harry Noden.
- 561611 Flight Sergeant George Herbert Percy.
- 569829 Flight Sergeant Frederick John Sanders.
- 566488 Flight Sergeant Percy Scott.
- 1303979 Flight Sergeant Gerald William Tisley.
- 517773 Flight Sergeant Leonard Edlward Watson.
- 530762 Flight Sergeant William, George Wise.
- $54168 Flight Sergeant Leslie Alfred Wright.
- 2658601 Acting Flight Sergeant Mary Wilson Longmuir, Women's Royal Auxiliary Air Force.
- 1059273 Acting Flight Sergeant John Mitchell.
- 573928 Chief Technician Brinley Owen Thomas.
- 2004435 Chief Technician Etheldreda Marion Wyatt Wingrave, Women's Royal Air Force.
- 612626 Sergeant Oliver Percival Carr.
- 579848 Sergeant Ernest Joseph Clarke.
- 529958 Sergeant James Clayton.
- 528520 Sergeant Stephenson John Ringham Curry.
- 340161 Sergeant George Harper.
- 1077148 Sergeant Albert Harris.
- 549636 Sergeant Basil Morris Hill.
- 1272067 Sergeant Alfred Vernon Macoy.
- 610773 Sergeant Roderick James Macrae.
- 900863 Sergeant Donald MacGregor Middleton.
- 591887 Sergeant Frank Pendlebury.
- 542849 Sergeant Harry Scattergood.
- 845035 Sergeant William John Smith.
- 527681 Senior Technician James Edgar McNeill.
- 4027887 Corporal Arthur Dodds.
- 4012427 Corporal Terry Ronald Hiscock.
- 4017338 Corporal Leslie Sumner.
- 3500839 Corporal Technician Reginald Donald Saunders.
- 4013063 Corporal Technician. Kenneth John Sheppard.
- 4063697 Acting Corporal Robert MacFarlane Macleod.
- 4072549 Senior Aiircraftman Alan Roy Lewis.

Civil Division

United Kingdom

- Herbert Adams, JP, Turner, Joseph Lucas Ltd., Birmingham.
- Harold Addison, Chief Inspector, Burtonwood Engineering Co. Ltd., Burtonwood. (Newton-le-Willows.)
- Walter William Aked, Skilled Electrical Fitter, J. Stone & Co. (Deptford) Ltd., London. (New Cross, S.E.14.)
- Edna Ivy Alsbury, Assistant Superintendent (Counter & Writing), Head Post Office, Gloucester.
- Johnstone Anderson, Substation Attendant, South East Scotland Electricity Board. (Edinburgh.)
- David Atkinson, Foreman Card Cutter, York Street Flax Spinning Co. Ltd., Belfast. (Bangor, County Down.)
- David Balsillie, Working Foreman, A. G. Spalding & Bros. Ltd., London. (Putney, S.W.15.)
- William Barben, Head Foreman, Gun Mounting Department, Vickers-Armstrongs Ltd., Barrow-in-Furness. (Preston.)
- Frederick Herbert Barnes, Lately Senior Paperkeeper, HM Treasury. (West Kensington, W.14.)
- Adam Barnie, Stores Superintendent, War Office, Stirling.
- Charles Bates, Foreman, East Mailing Research Station. (Maidstone.)
- Janet Beattie, Policewoman Inspector, Glasgow City Police Force. (Glasgow.)
- John Beck, Leading Turbine Driver, Kilmarnock Generating Station, South West Scotland Division, British Electricity Authority. (Kilmarnock.)
- Hilda Beese, Honorary Collector, Gladstone Road Savings Group, Kingswood, Bristol.
- William Charles Bell, Bookbinder, C. & H. T. Evans (Bookbinders) Ltd., Croydon. (Basildon, Essex.)
- William Ellis Sevan, Chargehand Carpenter, No. 47 Maintenance Unit, R.A.F. Hawarden, Cheshire.(Chester.)
- William Blackburn, Leading Hand, Bolton Leathers Ltd., Bolton.
- William Blackmore, Boatswain, SS Duke of Lancaster, British Transport Commission. (Belfast.)
- Ellen Blundell, Chief Supervisor (Telephones), Head Post Office, Preston. (Southport.)
- Albert John Bowden, Senior Surgery Assistant, HM Dockyard, Devonport. (Plymouth.)
- James Bray, Wharf Boatswain, Trinity House Depot, East Cowes.
- Agnes Brennan, Female Overlooker, Royal Ordnance Factory, Chorley.
- George Whitehead Brooke, Chief Inspector, Bradford City Police Force. (Bradford.)
- Edgar Thomas Brown, Chief Instructor, National Sea Training School, Sharpness. (Newtown, Gloucestershire.)
- Jeanie Barbara Brown, Sub-Postmistress, Conon Bridge Sub-Office, Ross-shire.
- Harry Charles Broxup, Assistant Divisional Officer, London Fire Brigade. (Lambeth, S.E.1.)
- Alfred Thomas Bruton, Chief Inspector, Doncaster Police Force. (Doncaster.)
- Donald Cameron, Lately Purser, Loch Shiel Steamboat Service. (Acharacle, Argyll.)
- Margaret Campbell, Chief Officer, Grade II, HM Prison, Greenock.
- Saide Moneypenny Campbell, Honorary Collector, Works Savings Group, Belfast Co-operative Society, Belfast.
- Reuben Carter, Laboratory Mechanic, Royal Naval Signal School. (Slindon, Sussex.)
- William Challice, Voluntary Ambulance Driver, Watchet, Somerset.
- Charles Christie, Telephone Linesman, Jamaica, War Office.
- James Coates, Foreman Shipwright, Cook, Welton & Gemmell Ltd., Beverley.
- George Coghlan, Overseer, W. & G. Baird Ltd., Belfast.
- Mary Collins, Canteen Manageress, N.A.A.F.I, Belfast. (Portadown, County Armagh.)
- Fred Collison, Chargehand Jointer, North Eastern Electricity Board. (Middlesbrough.)
- Janet Mary Cooper, Honorary Collector, Street Savings Group, Aldeburgh, Suffolk.
- Clifford Coult, DCM, Leading Stoker, Goole Gasworks, North Eastern Gas Board. (Goole.)
- Robert Cowan, Senior Operator of Lead-pipe Extrusion, Associated Lead Manufacturers Ltd., Newcastle-on-Tyne. (Jarrow.)
- Walter Creaser, Master Sinker, Durham Division, National Coal Board. (Houghton-le-Spring.)
- George Cresswell, Foreman, Markham & Co. Ltd., Chesterfield.
- Hector Alfred Curtis, Senior Assistant (Scientific), Meteorological Office, Air Ministry. (New Maiden, Surrey.)
- John Edwin Marcus Dains, Observer, Post 4/L.2, Little Waltham, No. 4 Group, Royal Observer Corps. (Chelmsford, Essex.)
- Henry Daley, Mains and Services Foreman, North Western Division, North Thames Gas Board. (Harlesden, N.W.10.)
- Thomas Henry Dalton, Graphite Machine Hand, United Kingdom Atomic Energy Authority. (Cleator Moor, Cumberland.)
- Wildred Dando, Coal Face Worker, Kilmersdon Colliery, South Western Division, National Coal Board. (Radstock, Somerset.)
- John Edwin Davies, Oil Mill Foreman, J. Bibby & Sons Ltd., Liverpool.
- James Dawson, Donkeyman-Greaser, MV Ulster Prince, Coast Lines Ltd. (Belfast.)
- Tom Salmon Dawson, Checkweighman, Rothwell Colliery, North Eastern Division, National Coal Board. (Leeds.)
- James Albert Dearlove, Transport Driver, Rockware Glass Ltd., Greenford, Middlesex. (Hayes.)
- Ronald Demelwick, Member, Coast Life Saving Corps, Mount Batten. (Plymouth.)
- Alice Dilks, Nursing Assistant, Western Hospital, Balby. (Doncaster.)
- George Dobb, Chief Boiler Inspector, Doncaster, Eastern Region, British Railways. (Doncaster.)
- Charles Docherty, Diver, RFA Sea Salvor. (Johnstone, Renfrewshire.)
- Alexander Wallace Duncan, Senior Paper Keeper, Scottish Record Office. (Edinburgh.)
- Edith Lesley England, Centre Organiser, Goole Borough, Women's Voluntary Services.
- George Henry England, Jointer, Southern Electricity Board. (Weymouth, Dorset.)
- Arthur Enstone, Honorary Collector, North Newington School Savings Group, Banbury.
- John Henry Evans, Leading Smith, Brown, Lenox & Co. Ltd., Pontypridd.
- Edith Payne Farley, Member, Hertfordshire Branch, British Red Cross Society. (Hertford.)
- Harold Theophilus Field, Savings Canvasser, Steel Company of Wales Ltd., Lysaghts Division, Monmouthshire. (Newport.)
- Albert Edward Fitness, Head Office Signalling Inspector, Eastern Region, British Railways. (Woodford Green, Essex.)
- Mary Alice Fletcher, Honorary Collector, Savings Groups, Consett, County Durham.
- Alfred Forman, Head Foreman Engineer, Humber Graving Dock & Engineering Co. Ltd., Immingham. (Grimsby.)
- Alfred William Fouracre, Machine Minder, Ordnance Board Printing Press, Ministry of Supply. (Welling, Kent.)
- Thomas William Gibson, Member, Coast Life Saving Corps, Whitley Bay.
- Laurence John Goudie, Lately Lamp Trimmer, SS Gothic, Shaw Savill & Albion Co. Ltd. (Lerwick, Shetland Isles.)
- Francis Joseph Gough, Superintendent, Power Station, Moascar, War Office.
- Stanley Thomas Greensmith, Staff Inspector, Metropolitan Special Constabulary. (Clapton Common, E.5.)
- William Grime, Deputy, Astley Green Colliery, North Western Division, National Coal Board. (Manchester.)
- Edwin James Hadlow, Pumpman, tanker Latirus, Shell Tankers Ltd. (Rochester, Kent.)
- Nichol Elliott Hastie, Company Officer, Angus Fire Brigade. (Dundee.)
- George Albert Hawcroft, Ripper, Manvers Main Colliery, North Eastern Division, National Coal Board. (Mexborough, Yorkshire.)
- James Francis Haydock, Transport Supervisor, HM Embassy, Vienna.
- George Edward Hayman, Head Warder, National Maritime Museum. (Abbey Wood, S.E.2.)
- Lawrence Haynes, Cable Room Telegraphist, General Post Office. (West Wimbledon, S.W.20.)
- Cecil Heath, Foreman, J. Samuel White & Co. Ltd., Cowes, Isle of Wight.
- Henry George Heywood, Supervisor, Alders (Tamworth) Ltd., Staffordshire.
- Elizabeth Florence Hill, Assistant County Organiser, Metropolitan Surrey, Women's Voluntary Services. (Surbiton, Surrey.)
- Frederick Thomas Hills, Assistant Superintendent (Counter & Telegraph), South Eastern District Post Office. (West Wimbledon, S.W.20.)
- William Thomas Hine, Letterpress Machine Minder, University Press, Oxford.
- Samuel Hinton, Ripper, Mid-Cannock Colliery, West Midlands Division, National Coal Board. (Cannock.)
- Leslie Frank Hitchcock, Electrician, South Eastern Division, British Electricity Authority. (Tonbridge, Kent.)
- Ernest Timothy Hodgson, Jointer, North Western Electricity Board. (Keswick, Cumberland.)
- Thomas William Holden, Chargehand Fitter, Royal Ordnance Factory, Barnbow, Leeds.
- Frederick Hope, Ambulance Room Attendant, Deaf Hill Colliery, Durham Division, National Coal Board. (Trimdon Station, County Durham.)
- Frederick Norman Hosking, Permanent Chargeman of Shipwrights, Royal Naval Armament Depot, Priddy's Hard. (Gosport.)
- Frederick George Hutchins, Chief Inspector, Air Ministry Constabulary. (Stockport.)
- Helen Jackson, Centre Organiser, Marlow Urban District, Women's Voluntary Services. (Marlow.)
- Charles William Jacobs, Chargehand (Mechanic), Radar Research Establishment, Ministry of Supply. (Worcester.)
- William Henry James, Gardener-Caretaker, North-West European District, Imperial War Graves Commission.
- William Jefferies, Senior Skilled Turner, Torrance & Sons Ltd., Bitton, Near Bristol.
- James Parsley Jeffery, MM, Technician, Class I, Reliance Telephone Exchange, General Post Office. (Bexley, Kent.)
- Horace Jenkinson, Haulage-hand, Grimethorpe Colliery, North Eastern Division, National Coal Board. (Barnsley.)
- Thomas Jenkinson, Inshore Fisherman, Filey, Yorkshire.
- Robert Griffith Jones, Maintenance Officer, Dinorwic Quarries Savings Clubs, Caernarvonshire. (Llanrug.)
- William Elliott Kells, Head Constable, Royal Ulster Constabulary. (Belfast.)
- Patrick Kelly, Bricklayer's Mate, Ransomes & Rapier Ltd., Ipswich.
- John Kirkup, Practical Instructor, Ashington Colliery, Northern (Northumberland and Cumberland) Division, National Coal Board. (Ashington.)
- Albert Edward Lake, Silversmith, Walker & Hall Ltd., Sheffield.
- Frederick William Latham, Works Overseer, Grade III, HM Stationery Office. (Kenton, Middlesex.)
- George Leadbeater, Lithographic Prover, Survey Production Centre, War Office. (Battersea, S.W.11.)
- John Love, Surface Foreman, Mauchline Colliery, Scottish Division, National Coal Board. (Mauchline, Ayrshire.)
- John James Craig McConnell, Chargeman, Royal Naval Boom Defence Depot, Greenock.
- Hugh McDowall, Underground Pump Attendant, Lingerwood Colliery, Scottish Division, National Coal Board. (Newtongrange, Midlothian.)
- Joseph James McGaughey, Sergeant Instructor, Ulster Special Constabulary. (Armagh.)
- Arthur McKinnell, Warden, Territorial Army Centre, Macclesfield.
- Jean McLean, Centre Organiser, Billingham Urban District, Women's Voluntary Services. (Billingham, County Durham.)
- William Macrae, Commandant, Eastwood Section, St. Andrew's Ambulance Corps. (Glasgow.)
- William Mathews, Carpenter, P. Gaylard & Son Ltd., Glamorgan.
- Simon May, Cutter, Trefano Shoe Ltd., Williamstown, Rhondda.
- Emma Mellor, Bookbinder and Pattern Card Maker, Brough, Nicholson & Hall Ltd., Leek, Staffordshire.
- Fanny Louisa Miller, Group Officer, Middlesex Auxiliary Fire Service. (Hayes End.)
- George Miller, Deputy, North Seaton Colliery, Northern (Northumberland & Cumberland) Division, National Coal Board. (Ashington.)
- Albert Joseph Monk, Breakdown Foreman, London Transport Executive, British Transport Commission.(Neasden.)
- Sam Moore, Head Screens Mechanic, Ellistown Colliery, East Midlands Division, National Coal Board. (Leicester.)
- Gordon Frederick Mortlock, Sprayer, Grade B1, Ordnance Survey Department. (Southampton.)
- Leonard Harvey Mumford, Superintendent of Dining Rooms, House of Commons. (Clapham Common, S.W.11.)
- Claude Thomas Munt, Mess Steward, Staff College, Camberley, War Office.
- Harold Neckervis, Chargehand Instrument Maker, Royal Aircraft Establishment, Ministry of Supply. (Camberley, Surrey.)
- Alfred Nightingale, Turner, British Insulated Calender's Cables Ltd., Prescot, Lancashire.
- Charles Robert Oakes, Dock Worker, Gairston. (Liverpool.)
- George Frank Oakshott, Inspector (Postal), Head Post Office, Epsom, Surrey.
- Honora O'Brien, Telephone Supervisor, Grade I, Royal Aircraft Establishment, Ministry of Supply. (Farnborough.)
- Thomas Henry Oxford, Senior Supplies Superintendent, Supplies Department, General Post Office. (Potters Bar, Middlesex.)
- John Henry Oxley, District Gasfitting Foreman, Sheffield Undertaking, No. 1 District, East Midlands Gas Board. (Sheffield.)
- George Arthur Palfreyman, Occupational Supervisor, Sheffield Industrial Rehabilitation Unit, Ministry of Labour and National Service.
- Thomas George Partridge, Chief Cook, MV Port Napier, Port Line Ltd. (Hull.)
- Thomas Edward Burleigh Peters, Senior Foreman of Storehouses, Hong Kong, Admiralty.
- William Leigh Peters, Stores Superintendent, No. 3 Maintenance Unit, R.A.F, Milton, Berkshire. (Didcot.)
- Marjorie Alexandra Phillipson, Conductress, United Automobile Services Ltd., Newcastle-on-Tyne.
- Janet Perret, Fine Wire Mesh Weaver, Begg Cousland & Co. Ltd., Glasgow.
- Wilfred Purdew, Engineering Foreman, Cambridge Gas Works, Eastern Gas Board.
- George Frederick Radcliffe, Travelling Night Supervisor (Telephones), Telephone Manager's Office, Liverpool.
- Richard George Rice, JP, Face Worker (Collier), Llanhilleth Steam Colliery, South Western Division, National Coal Board. (Abertillery.)
- Eli Richards, MM, Colliery Overman, Elliot Colliery, South Western Division, National Coal Board. (New Tredegar.)
- William Ernest Richardson, Inspector (Postal), Post Office, Leicester.
- Thomas Rigby, Loom Overlooker, Barlow Brothers & Greenwood Ltd., Accrington.
- Joseph Riley, Foreman of Assembly Department, British Timken Ltd., Birmingham.
- Charles Robertson, Senior Mains and Services Inspector, Dundee Gasworks, Scottish Gas Board.
- Esther Jane Robinson, Honorary Collector, Littlebeck Savings Group, Whitby, North Riding of Yorkshire.
- William Mark Robinson, Senior Foreman, R. B. Pullin & Co. Ltd., Brentford, Middlesex.(Teddington.)
- Edward Rooke, Works Technical Officer (Grade III), Fuel Research Station, Department of Scientific and Industrial Research. (Abbey Wood, S.E.2.)
- William Rutherford, Technician, Class I, Newcastle-on-Tyne, General Post Office.
- Arthur William Scoins, Driver (Heavy), West London Group, South Eastern Division, British Road Services Board of Management. (Walworth, S.E.17.)
- Catherine Isabella Scott, Supervisor (Telephones), Thanet Exchange, General Post Office.(Birchington, Kent.)
- Martha Jane Scott, Manageress, Newcastleton Branch, Braemar (Knitwear) Ltd., Hawick.
- George Seagger, General Foreman, Kingston Works, South Eastern Gas Board. (Kingston-on-Thames.)
- Herbert Shaw, Weighbridge Attendant, Hartshead, North West, Merseyside and North Wales Division, British Electricity Authority. (Stalybridge, Cheshire.)
- Alexander John Silcox, School Staff Instructor, Repton School, Derby.
- Charles Lucian Skinner, Technical Officer, Post Office Telephone Exchange, Ebbw Vale. (Tredegar.)
- Maribel Irma Slessor, Organiser, Hospital Car Service, Inverness.
- James Smith, Permanent Chargeman of Fitters (Aero), Royal Naval Air Station, Lee-on-Solent. (Gosport.)
- John Smith, Foreman Medal Issuer, Army Medal Office, Droitwich.
- Ronald Benjamin Smith, Chief Inspector, Metropolitan Police Force. (Orpington, Kent.)
- George Snow, Agricultural Worker, Newport, Isle of Wight.
- George Sparks, Chief Electrical Inspector, William McGeoch & Co. Ltd., Birmingham.
- Louise Amy Steddy, Overseer (Telegraphs), Head Post Office, Guildford, Surrey.
- Tilson Tan, Assistant Stores Officer, Singapore, (Ministry of Transport and Civil Aviation.
- Joseph Harold Tapley, Postal and Telegraph Officer, Head Post Office, Wrexham, Denbighshire.
- Harold Allen Tatford, Stores Superintendent, Base Ordnance Depot, Bicester, War Office.
- Matthew Thompson, JP, Checkweighman, Askern Main Colliery, North Eastern Division, National Coal Board. (Doncaster.)
- William Tribe, Head Forester, Cannock Chase, Forestry Commission. (Penkridge, Staffordshire.)
- Herbert John Varcoe Truscott, Sub-Postmaster, Nanpean Sub-Office, St. Austell, Cornwall.
- Walter Vass, Overseer of Clothing, Office of the Receiver for the Metropolitan Police. (Morden, Surrey.)
- Harry Vincent, Valveman, Luton Gasworks, Watford Division, Eastern Gas Board.
- George Wain, Stintman, Markham Collieries, East Midlands Division, National Coal Board.(Chesterfield.)
- Harry Wain, Head Forester, Salisbury Plain, War Office. (Netheravon, Wiltshire.)
- Michael William Wallace, Wire Rod Furnaceman, Guest Keen & Nettlefolds (South Wales) Ltd., Cardiff.
- Frank Charles Waller, Fitter (Electrical) Enfield District, Eastern Electricity Board. (Enfield, Middlesex.)
- Frederick Eustace Wardell, Animal Attendant, Veterinary Laboratory, Ministry of Agriculture and Fisheries. (Weybridge, Surrey.)
- Lee Luckan Warren, Estate Bailiff, Air Ministry, Halton. (Wendover.)
- Frederick Watson, Jacquard Card Puncher, Martin & Holliwell (1912) Ltd., Nottingham.
- Minnie Doris May Webster, Chief Supervisor, Croydon Telephone Exchange, General Post Office. (Ewell, Surrey.)
- Francis Michael Westley, MM, Civilian Warrant Officer, No. 1563 (Buckingham) Squadron, Air Training Corps. (Buckingham.)
- Alfred John Widdecombe, Chief Inspector, War Department Constabulary, Ministry of Supply, Shoeburyness.
- Francis Antoninus Williams, Foreman, George Goodman Ltd., Birmingham.
- John William Wilson, Maintenance Engineer, Sheepbridge Steel Castings Ltd., Sutton-in-Ashfield. (Mansfield.)
- Francis Edward Winniatt, Driver, Western Welsh Omnibus Co. Ltd. (Glamorgan.)
- Charles Edward Withers, Chargehand Driller, Tyne Dock Engineering Co. Ltd., South Shields.
- John Mitchell Woodgate, Laboratory Worker "A", United Kingdom Atomic Energy Authority. (Sevenoaks, Kent.)
- George Thomas Wright, Ironfoundry Bench Moulder, R. W. Crabtree & Sons Ltd., Leeds.
- Harry Ewart Weeks Wright, Established Chargehand of Wardroom Attendants, HMS Excellent. (Portchester, Hampshire.)
- Fong Kao Wu, Draughtsman, Singapore, Ministry of Works.
- Shamam Yoseph, Head Nurse, Medical Wing, R.A.F. Levies, Iraq.
- Enche Zohara binti Muhammad Nur, Welfare Assistant, Blakang Mati, Singapore.

State of Tasmania

- Lawrence Major Ford, lately Office Keeper and House Bailiff, Government House, Hobart.

Basutoland

- Selborne Letsie, Development Officer, Agricultural Department, Basutoland.
- Tlutlo Sesoane, Technical Instructor, Grade I, Central Prison, Maseru, Basutoland.

Colonial Empire

- Joseph Edward Wells, Turnkey, HM Prison, Nassau, Bahamas.
- Mary Madeiros, Matron, Mental Hospital, Bermuda.
- Rupert Ashley Richardson, Collecting Officer, Administration of Justice Department, Bermuda.
- Louise Sophia Grenion, Nurse Midwife, Leper Hospital, Mahaica, British Guiana.
- Loizos Christodoulou, Distinct Welfare Officer, Cyprus.
- Kulangara Chacko Mathew, Statistical Assistant, East Africa High Commission.
- Manuel Rodriguez, Shiftchargeman, City Council Electricity Station, Gibraltar.
- William Edward Haworth, Forester, Ragati Forest District, Kenya.
- David Kaindi wa Kata, Chief of Mbooni Location, Machakos District, Kenya.
- Sheikh Omari bin Haji, Trader, Nairobi, Kenya.
- Ali bin Mustapha, Penghulu, Bukit Kepong, Johore, Federation of Malaya.
- Abdul Aziz bin Din, Assistant Inspector of Malay Schools, Federation of Malaya.
- Chong Thian Keng, Assistant Resettlement Officer, Taiping District, Perak, Federation of Malaya.
- Foo Kok-Chuan, Auxiliary Police Constable, Segamat District, Johore, Federation of Malaya.
- Ismail bin Abdul Hamid, Hospital Assistant, Travelling Dispensary, Segamat, Johore, Federation of Malaya.
- Omar bin Bakar. Lately Game Ranger, King George V National Park, Federation of Malaya.
- Ong Hock Liang, Technical Assistant, Telecommunications Department, Federation of Malaya.
- Gurdial Singh s/o Pakhar Singh, Police Clerk and Interpreter, Selangor, Federation of Malaya.
- Tan Hor Huat, Technical Assistant, Telecommunications Department, Federation of Malaya.
- Kumarasamy Visagaperumal, Chief Clerk, Treasury Accountant's Office, Port Dickson, Federation of Malaya.
- Ramyade Khedun, Permanent Way Sirdar, Railways, Mauritius.
- Oyenke Agedah, Beachmaster, Marine Department, Federation of Nigeria.
- Ben Ndiwe Inoma, Assistant Agricultural Officer, Federation of Nigeria.
- Anna Pindok, Staff Midwife, North Borneo.
- Hezekiah Nkonjera, Senior Capitao, Kawambwa Boma, Northern Rhodesia.
- George Forster Jones, Railway Yard Master, Port Management Branch, Railway, Sierra Leone.
- Cheng Bui Eng, Inspector of Police, Singapore.
- Jambiar Kahin, Clan Headman, Somaliland.
- James Blackhall, Works Foreman, Water Development Department, Tanganyika.
- Espie Wright, Cable Jointer, Public Works Department, Zanzibar.

=== Royal Victorian Medal (RVM) ===
In Silver

- Police Constable Herbert Conway Avery, Metropolitan Police Force.
- Edric Henry Bunce.
- John Burt.
- Alexander Yourston Cunningham.
- George Reginald Elliott.
- Ernest John Mars.
- John James Mason.
- Police Constable Victor Ernest Pearce, Metropolitan Police Force.

=== Royal Red Cross (RRC) ===
- Helen Moore, ARRC, Principal Matron, Queen Alexandra's Royal Naval Nursing Service.
- Lieutenant-Colonel Joan Howe, ARRC, (206365), Queen Alexandra's Royal Army Nursing Corps.
- Colonel Enid Grace Mary Reynolds, MBE, (206409), Queen Alexandra's Royal Army Nursing Corps.

==== Associate of the Royal Red Cross (ARRC) ====
- Doreen Geoghegan, Head V.A.D. Nursing Member.
- Major Dorothy Hunt (223206), Queen Alexandra's Royal Army Nursing Corps.
- Squadron Officer Dorothy Gertrude Masters (405143), Princess Mary's Royal Air Force Nursing Service.
- Flight Officer Doriel Vivian Lionel Sharples (406357), Princess Mary's Royal Air Force Nursing Service.

=== Air Force Cross (AFC) ===
Royal Air Force

Wing Commander

- George Godfrey Petty, DSO, DFC, (44357).

Squadron Leaders

- Leslie Frederick Banks, DFC, (123250).
- Douglas Bower, MBE, (134060).
- Stanley Reginald Dixon (113331).
- Kenneth Lindsay Hughes (153435).
- Dennis Christopher Lawrence Kearns (151961).
- William Kent (149636).
- Ernest John Roberts (50609).
- Ian Drysdale Roxburgh, AFM, (63424).
- James Eric Storrar, DFC, (41881), Royal Auxiliary Air Force.
- Hugh Marsden Hough Tudor, DFC, (124527).
- Frederick Percival Walker (59499).

Flight Lieutenants

- Cecil Bartlett (55694).
- Stanley Bowater, DFC, (185551).
- William David Davenport Davies (191452).
- Jeffrey Graham Gould (168274).
- Frank Henry Watson Harrington (137446).
- Kenvyn Jenkins (196513).
- Peter William Ibbotson Jenner (1850761).
- Justin Michael McCann (189091).
- Charles Richard Palmer (202753).
- Robert Michael Raw (607026).
- Gilbert Richards (149955).
- Stanley Douglas Timms (174392).
- Norman Westby, DFC, (177634).
- Tadeusz Wier (500238).

==== Bar to Air Force Cross ====
Royal Air Force

- Wing Commander Harold Arthur Cooper Bird-Wilson, DSO, DFC, AFC, (40335).
- Acting Wing Commander Robert Bruce Cole, DFC, AFC, (66483).
- Squadron Leader Alfred Denmark Burt, AFC, (49994).
- Acting Squadron Leader Roger Leslie Topp, AFC, (166654).
- Flight Lieutenant Colin Ian Blyth, DFC, AFC, (199075).

=== Air Force Medal (AFM) ===
Royal Air Force

Flight Sergeants

- 1860201 Peter Clark.
- 1673085 Leslie Craven.
- 1603490 Peter Charles Crouch.
- 1624094 Albert Dixon.
- 1436817 George Steinbeck Kerr.
- 1181063 Reginald George Wilding.
- 576582 William James McClean Wilson.

Sergeants

- 579364 Neville Lawrence.
- 1395373 John James Forbes Logan.
- 977662 Robert Walter James Rhoden.
- 2360042 Leon Anthony Walter.

Acting Sergeant

- 3104921 Alexander Kenneth Kidd.

=== Queen's Commendation for Valuable Service in the Air ===
United Kingdom

- Captain Hugh Cecil Bailey, DFC, DFM, Senior Captain, Second Class, British European Airways Corporation. (Gerrards Cross, Buckinghamshire.)
- Anne Burns, Principal Scientific Officer, Royal Aircraft Establishment, Ministry of Supply. (Church Crookham, Hampshire.)
- Captain Stanley Ernest Joseph Jones, DFC, DFM, Senior Captain, Second Class, British European Airways Corporation. (Heston, Middlesex.)
- Captain Ian Radnor Stephens, DFC, Captain, British Overseas Airways Corporation. (Chalfont St. Giles, Buckinghamshire.)

Royal Navy

- Lieutenant Commander Robert Michael Crosley, DSC.

Army

- Lieutenant Colonel Bernard Edward Mills Repton (109305), Royal Regiment of Artillery.

Royal Air Force

Acting Wing Commander

- Eric Raymond Dutt, AFC, (78722).

Squadron Leaders

- George James Beardsall (133428), Royal Auxiliary Air Force Reserve of Officers.
- John Alexander Blythe (48239).
- Paul Cass Bowry (162969).
- Douglas Harry Chopping, DFC, (124862).
- Robert William George Freer (156754).
- Władysław Jan Potocki, DFC, (500066).
- John Adam Sowrey, DFC, (33551).
- John Charles Steele (150198).

Flight Lieutenants

- Peter Edward Bairsto (202703).
- Francis William Bell (173863).
- Donald Chapman (57639).
- Roy Clark (1693620).
- Desmond Martin Divers (1805273).
- Kenneth Morsland Hall (1588179).
- Wallace Roy Herbert (120541).
- Alan Francis Jenkins (200020).
- Charles Harris Lazenby (66589), (since deceased).
- Colin Campbell MacGillivray (193436).
- Ronald Roy McGowan, AFC, (55073).
- Alan Derek Piggott (153335), RAF Reserve of Officers.
- Colin Donald Preece (1898620).
- Clifford James George Short (175912).
- Roy Joseph Skinner (1605715).
- George Henry Snape, DFC, (51831).
- Michael Hugh Ware (147134).
- Royston Watson (582051).
- John Whelan (183869).

Flying Officer

- Włodzimierz Władysław Mudry (780416).

Master Pilots

- Reginald Laurence Chantler (1526843).
- Zbigniew Czarnecki (780829).

Master Engineer

- John Moir McCallum, AFC (973382).

Flight Sergeants

- 1600539 Noel Edward Cooke.
- 4066596 Richard Gordon Waddell.

Sergeant (now Pilot Officer)

- 3504860 Arthur Brian Dicken.

Sergeants

- 582327 Grenville Gordon Griffiths.
- 4040472 Robert Grahame Hardy.
- 3507013 Brian Norman Heathfield.

=== Queen's Police Medal (QPM) ===
England and Wales

- Sidney Ballance, Chief Constable, Barrow-in-Furness Borough Police Force.
- William John Ridd, Chief Constable, West Suffolk County Constabulary.
- Albert Edward Needham, Chief Constable, Doncaster Borough Police Force.
- Harold Beaumont, Commander, Metropolitan Police.
- Alfred Allen, Detective Chief Superintendent, Sheffield City Police Force.
- Albert Ewart Evans, Chief Superintendent, Glamorgan County Constabulary.
- Arthur George Mack, MBE, Superintendent (I), Metropolitan Police and Staff Officer to Her Majesty's Inspectors of Constabulary.
- Frank Edwin Gillies, Superintendent (I), Metropolitan Police.
- Albert Ernest Clark, Superintendent, North Riding of Yorkshire Constabulary.
- Archibald Eli West, Superintendent, Devon Constabulary.
- William Benjamin Jenner, Superintendent, Northumberland County Constabulary.

Scotland

- Malcolm McLeod, Chief Superintendent, Glasgow City Police Force.
- Donald Stewart Cormack, Superintendent, Edinburgh City Police Force.

Northern Ireland

- Francis Mohan, Head Constable, Royal Ulster Constabulary.

Australia

- Leslie John Schumacher, Superintendent, 2nd Class, New South Wales Police Force.
- Daniel Edwin Ryan, Superintendent, 2nd Class, New South Wales, Police Force.
- John Young, Superintendent, 2nd Class, New South Wades Police Force.
- Henry Ernest Snowden, Superintendent, 3rd Class, New South Wales Police Force.
- Henry Boswell, Superintendent, 3rd Class, New South Wales Police Force.
- John Edwin Forsyth, Inspector, 1st Class, New South Wales Police Force.

Southern Rhodesia

- Colonel Arthur Selwyn Hickman, MBE, CPM, Commissioner of the British South Africa Poldce.

Colonies, Protectorates, Protected States and Trust Territory

- Trevor Westover Jenkins, Acting Assistant Commissioner of Police, Kenya.
- Patrick Whiteing, Senior Superintendent of Police, Kenya.
- Henry George Beverley, Senior Assistant Commissioner of Police, Federation of Malaya.
- Walter Philip Thompson, Assistant Commissioner of Police, Federation of Malaya.
- George Cachia, Deputy Commissioner of Police, Malta.
- Derek Sendey Fountain, Commissioner of Police, Nigeria Police Force.
- Nolan Knighton Mellett, Deputy Commissioner of Police, Nigeria Police Force.
- Arthur John Inskip Hawkins, Assistant Commissioner of Police, Northern Rhodesia.
- William Edwin Rumbelow, Deputy Commissioner of Police, Sierra Leone.
- Richard Evlyn Middleton, Acting Assistant Commissioner of Police, Tanganyika.

=== Queen's Fire Services Medal (QFSM) ===
England and Wales

- Sidney Frank Chandler, BEM, Divisional Officer, London Fire Brigade.
- Thomas Edward Smith, Chief Officer, Halifax Fire Brigade.
- Thomas George Haseman, Chief Officer, Westmorland Fire Brigade.
- Gerald Victor John Avery, Chief Officer, Chester Fire Brigade.
- Sidney Herbert Todd, Divisional Officer, Birmingham Fire Brigade.

Protected State

- Frederick Francis Charles Watkins, Chief Inspector, Fire Services, Federation of Malaya.
- Victor George Donough, State Fire Officer, Johore, Federation of Malaya.

=== Colonial Police Medal (CPM) ===
Southern Rhodesia

- Lieutenant-Colonel Robert Hugh Borland, British South Africa Police.
- Major Charles William Duncombe, MBE, British South Africa Police.
- Lieutenant-Colonel George Lionel Fitzwilliam, British South Africa Police.
- Hanock, Station Sergeant, British South Africa Police.
- Lieutenant-Colonel Harold Jackson, British South Africa Police.
- Peter McLaren McDonald, Chief Inspector, British South Africa Police.
- Sikwilidi, Station Sergeant, British South Africa Police.

Basutoland

- Sebolai Tsepane, Staff Sergeant, Basutoland Mounted Police.
- Captain Reginald Montague Williams, Basutoland Mounted Police.

Bechuanaland

- Captain Albert Donald Clark, Bechuanaland Protectorate Police.

Colonial Empire

- Abdullah bin Man, Sub-Inspector, Federation of Malaya Police Force.
- Bahari bin Haji Taib, Sub-Inspector, Federation of Malaya Police Force.
- Abu Bakar bin Ali, Detective Sub-Inspector, Federation of Malaya Police Force.
- Roy Frank Belcher, Lieutenant, Federation of Malaya Police Force.
- Abdulla Bogo, Sergeant-Major, Nigeria Police Force.
- Frederick Alexander Sommerville Caldwell, Acting Senior Assistant Commissioner, Federation of Malaya Police Force.
- John William Chilton, Superintendent, Singapore Police Force.
- Adrian Nichol Merson Davies, Senior Superintendent, Nigeria Police Force.
- Anthony Quashie Deku, Sub-Inspector, Gold Coast Police Force.
- Essa Fazal Dina, Assistant Superintendent, Tanganyika Police Force.
- Frank Afari Djommoa, Assistant Superintendent, Gold Coast Police Force.
- Robert Charles Ehrke, Acting Assistant Commissioner, Federation of Malaya Police Force.
- William Eric Gordon Evans, Lieutenant, Federation of Malaya Police Force.
- Feng Yeh Kim, Inspector, Federation of Malaya Police Force.
- Stanhope Uriah Africanus Forster, Assistant Superintendent, Sierra Leone Police Force.
- Frederick George Beckles Gall, Senior Superintendent, Nigeria Police Force.
- Goon Heng Tann, Inspector, Federation of Malaya Police Force.
- Guy Charles Grace, Deputy Superintendent, Federation of Malaya Police Force.
- John Christie Graves, Superintendent, Nigeria Police Force.
- Thomas Ellis Hatton, Acting Superintendent, Federation of Malaya Police Force.
- John Edward Hayward, Acting Chief Inspector, Hong Kong Police Force.
- Stanley Patrick Hithersay, District Commandant, Kenya Police Reserve.
- John Ikwueme, Sergeant-Major, Nigeria Police Force.
- Johari bin Jakin, Sergeant, Federation of Malaya Police Force.
- Johari bin Mohamed Zain, Detective Sub-Inspector, Federation of Malaya Police Force.
- Amadu Kagbo, Sergeant-Major, Court Messenger Force, Sierra Leone.
- Bukari Kanjarga, Escort Sergeant, Gold Coast Police Force.
- Dogo Kanjarga, Escort Sergeant, Gold Coast Police Force.
- Katuu son of Kiamiba, Assistant Inspector, Kenya Police Force.
- Cyril Rudolph Keel, Assistant Superintendent, Federation of Malaya Police Force.
- Kikaw Kimaka, Assistant Inspector, Kenya Police Force.
- Yesufu Lafiaji, Sergeant, Nigeria Police Force.
- Kundan Lal, Inspector, Kenya Police Force.
- Mohamed Lali, Assistant Inspector, Kenya Police Force.
- Lau Fuk, Staff Sergeant, Hong Kong Police Force.
- Ronald William Laverick, Superintendent, Nigeria Police Force.
- Eric John Linsell, Deputy Superintendent, Singapore Police Force.
- Long bin Jaffar, Sergeant, Special Constabulary, Federation of Malaya.
- Ian Davidson Macdonald, Assistant Commissioner, Federation of Malaya Police Force.
- Gregory Malonzo, Inspector, Kenya Police Force.
- Abdul Manap bin Abdul Rahman, Sergeant-Major, Federation of Malaya Police Force.
- Philip Coleman Tiley Marner, Senior Superintendent, Nigeria Police Force.
- Mfaume son of Mwenyi Mkuu, Sergeant-Major, Tanganyika Police Force.
- M'Mugania M'Iringo, Assistant Inspector, Kenya Police Force.
- Mohamed bin Mat, Chief Inspector, Sarawak Constabulary.
- Mohamed bin Puteh Abu Bakar, Sergeant, Federation of Malaya Police Force.
- Mohamed bin Thabit, Corporal, Federation of Malaya Police Force.
- Khalif Mohamed, Assistant Inspector, Kenya Police Force.
- John Francis Arnold Mote, Chief Officer, Suva City Fire Brigade, Fiji.
- Gerald Hugh Alan Murphy, Acting Deputy Superintendent, Federation of Malaya Police Force.
- Mwafulilwa, Inspector, Northern Rhodesia Police Force.
- Sidney Albert Neal, Superintendent, Northern Rhodesia Police Force.
- Ginger Ntima, Chief Inspector, Nigeria Police Force.
- Michael Ntune, Inspector, Nigeria Police Force.
- John Ovie, Sergeant-Major, Nigeria Police Force.
- Max Bronte Parker, Deputy Commissioner, Bermuda Police Force.
- Mohamed Pilus bin Yusoh, Deputy Superintendent, Federation of Malaya Police Force.
- Abdul Rahman bin Haji Ahmad, Inspector, Federation of Malaya Police Force.
- Ramli bin Mann, Sub-Inspector, Federation of Malaya Police Force.
- John George Ritchie, Deputy Superintendent, Federation of Malaya Police Force.
- Mohamed Said bin Daie, Sergeant, Special Constabulary, Federation of Malaya.
- Hamis Salim, Assistant Inspector, Kenya Police Force.
- Paschalis Savvides, Chief Inspector, Cyprus Police Force.
- Shabudin bin Haji Salleh, Acting Sergeant-Major, Federation of Malaya Police Force.
- Jagir Singh son of Deep Singh, Sub-Inspector, Federation of Malaya Police Force.
- Sarwan Singh son of Hazara Singh, Inspector, Federation of Malaya Police Force.
- Stephen Cavendish Smith, DFC, Superintendent, Nigeria Police Force.
- James Hewitt Stewart, Superintendent, Kenya Police Force.
- Alfred Thomas Suffolk, Lieutenant, Federation of Malaya Police Force.
- Tajuddin bin Haji Ahmad, Assistant Superintendent, Federation of Malaya Police Force.
- Edward Amemelio Tetteh, Sub-Inspector, Gold Coast Police Force.
- Thoo Yam, Acting Deputy Superintendent, Federation of Malaya Police Force.
- George Michael Harrison Trent, Senior Superintendent, Kenya Police Force.
- Jonathan Wambua, Assistant Inspector, Kenya Police Force.
- Daudi Were son of Mulwale, Head Constable, Uganda Police Force.
- Lieutenant-Colonel Stanley Weston, Commandant, Special Constabulary, Tanganyika.
- Cyril Willoox, Senior Superintendent, Hong Kong Police Force.
- Yahaya bin Yusof, Sergeant-Major, Federation of Malaya Police Force.
- Osman Zekki, Chief Inspector, Cyprus Police Force.

== Australia ==
=== Knight Bachelor ===
- Giles Tatlock Chippindall, CBE, Director-General of Posts and Telegraphs, Postmaster-General's Department, Commonwealth of Australia.
- Archibald John Collins, DSO, MC, MB, ChM, President of the British Medical Association of Australia.
- Adolf Alexander Fitzgerald, OBE, Chairman of the Commonwealth Grants Commission.
- Roland Wilson, CBE, Secretary, Commonwealth Treasury.

=== Order of the Bath ===
==== Companion of the Order of the Bath (CB) ====
Military Division

- Major-General (honorary Lieutenant-General) Victor Clarence Secombe, CBE, (3/10), Australian Staff Corps (now retired).

=== Order of Saint Michael and Saint George ===
==== Companion of the Order of St Michael and St George (CMG) ====
- Brigadier Arthur Seaforth Blackburn, VC, CBE, Commonwealth Conciliation Commissioner, and Chairman of the Civilian Internees Trust Fund and the Prisoners of War Trust Fund.
- James Alfred Heading, DCM, MM. For services to primary industry in Australia.
- The Right Reverend Francis William Rolland, OBE, MC, Moderator-General of the Presbyterian Church of Australia. For services to Education.
- Professor Walter Lawry Waterhouse, MC. For services to the Wheat Industry in Australia.

=== Order of the British Empire ===
==== Knight Commander of the Order of the British Empire (KBE) ====
Military Division

- Air Marshal John Patrick Joseph McCauley, CB, CBE, Royal Australian Air Force.

Civil Division

- The Honourable Wilfred Kelsham Fullagar, Justice of the High Court of the Commonwealth of Australia.
- The Honourable Frank Walters Kitto, Justice of the High Court of the Commonwealth of Australia.

==== Commander of the Order of the British Empire (CBE) ====
Military Division

- Captain Henry Mackay Burrell, Royal Australian Navy.
- Major-General Arthur Gillespie Wilson, DSO, (3/43), Australian Staff Corps.
- Group Captain Geoffrey Clarke Hartnell, Royal Australian Air Force.

Civil Division

- Frank Struan Anderson. For services to Mining Engineering in Australia.
- Archibald John Eade. For charitable and social welfare services in Australia.
- John Douglas Lloyd Hood, Her Majesty's Australian Ambassador to the Federal Republic of Germany.
- Cecil Ralph Lambert, Secretary, Department of Territories, Commonwealth of Australia.
- Francis Anthony Meere, OBE, Comptroller-General, Department of Trade and Customs, Commonwealth of Australia.
- James Clarence Neagle, General Secretary of the Returned Sailors' Soldiers' and Airmens Imperial League of Australia.
- Leonard Charles Robson, MC. For services in the field of Education in Australia.
- Arthur Harold Tange, OBE, Secretary, Department of External Affairs, Commonwealth of Australia.
- Norman David Wilson. For public services, especially in the interests of ex-servicemen and their dependants in Australia.

==== Officer of the Order of the British Empire (OBE) ====
Military Division

- Commander (E) John Charles Balfour Anderson, DSC, RD, Royal Australian Naval Reserve.
- Commander John Langston Bath, Royal Australian Navy.
- Colonel James Weston Fletcher (2/29), Australian Staff Corps.
- Lieutenant-Colonel Ian Hartridge Lowen (3/72604), Royal Australian Infantry Corps.
- Group Captain Hans Dyring Hamilton, Royal Australian Air Force.
- Reserve Group Captain John Lloyd Waddy, DFC, ADC, Royal Australian Air Force.

Civil Division

- John Ronald Shafto Adair. For services to Civil Aviation in Australia.
- Gwendolen Norah Burbidge. For services to Nursing in Australia.
- Clifton Jenkyn Carne. For public services, particularly in connection with the promotion of Australia's trade overseas.
- Michael Chamberlin. For services to the community in Australia, especially in connection with the social welfare of young persons.
- Sydney Christie, Manager, Territory Enterprises Proprietary, Ltd., Australia.
- Ernest Charles de Burgh. For services to journalism in Australia.
- Elizabeth Anne Hamer. For charitable and social welfare services in Australia.
- Hannah Beynon, Lady Lloyd Jones. For social welfare services in Australia.
- Sydney Lucas, Director, War Service Homes Division, Department of Social Services, Commonwealth of Australia.
- Leslie Rae Lucke. For services in connection with the social welfare of returned servicemen in Australia.
- James Joseph Malone, MC, formerly Chairman of the Overseas Telecommunications Commission and deputy director, Posts and Telegraphs, New South Wales, Postmaster-General's Department, Commonwealth of Australia.
- Doris Alice Mason (Miss Doris Fitton). For services to the theatre and dramatic art in Australia.
- Jane Anne McLeod. For social welfare services in Australia.
- Frederick James Meacham, managing director and Secretary, Australian Provincial Daily Press, Ltd.
- The Reverend John Gray Robertson, Convenor of the Australian Inland Mission.
- Kathleen Sandover. For public and social welfare services in Australia.
- Percival Evert Russell Vanthoff, MVO, Deputy Director-General, Posts and Telegraphs, Postmaster-General's Department, Commonwealth of Australia.

==== Member of the Order of the British Empire (MBE) ====
Military Division

- Lieutenant (L) Henry John Percy Boxall, Royal Australian Navy.
- Major (temporary) Willoughby John Crosby (VX700235), Royal Australian Infantry Corps.
- 2/162999 Warrant Officer Class I John Francis Enright, Royal Australian Army Ordnance Corps.
- Captain George Edward Johnson (3/306), Royal Corps of Australian Electrical and Mechanical Engineers.
- Major (provisional) Ernest Thomas Lenton (1/35803), Royal Australian Army Service Corps.
- Lieutenant Raymond Clifford Lovett (2/161289), Royal Australian Engineers (Transportation).
- Major Alan George Cranston Mason (3/55212), Royal Australian Artillery.
- Major (Quartermaster) Robert Victor McMillan (3/193), Royal Australian Army Provost Corps.
- 5/9276 Warrant Officer Class I Charles Francis Edward Platell, Royal Australian Engineers.
- 4/119 Warrant Officer Class II Thomas John Thompson, Royal Australian Armoured Corps.
- Acting Wing Commander Leslie Norman Kroll (011334), Royal Australian Air Force.
- Flight Lieutenant James Washington Wylie (0234), Royal Australian Air Force.
- Warrant Officer Thomas Reid Fotheringham (A.3657), Royal Australian Air Force.

Civil Division

- Robert Archer. For services in the interests of blinded ex-servicemen Australia.
- The Reverend Herbert Maxwell Arrowsmith, Commonwealth Secretary of the British and Foreign Bible Society of Australia.
- Elizabeth Bailey. For philanthropic and social welfare services in Australia.
- Moya Kathleen Bailey, MB, BS, (Doctor Blackall), a prominent medical practitioner in the Australian Capital Territory.
- Frank Banks, of Laverton, Western Australia, a mail contractor to the Postmaster-General's Department, Commonwealth of Australia.
- Major George Conybear Batchelor. For public services in Australia.
- Marion Catherina Blaxland. For social welfare services in Australia, especially under the auspices of the Red Cross.
- Annie Priscilla Book. For services rendered in connection with various charitable organisations in Australia.
- Donald Gillies Browne. For social welfare services in Australia, especially in the interests of ex-servicemen.
- Catherine Wallace Miller Cameron. For educational and social welfare services, especially on behalf of girls, in Australia.
- Thomas Frederick Corley, Senior Clerk, Trade and Customs Branch, Office of the High Commissioner for the Commonwealth of Australia in London.
- David Crawley. For services to Music in New Guinea and Papua.
- Annie Margaret Crome. For public and social welfare services in Australia.
- Ernest Albert Crook, Accountant, Office of the High Commissioner for the Commonwealth of Australia in London.
- Evelyn Paget Evans, JP, chief executive officer and General Secretary of the Australian Physiotherapy Association.
- Joseph Horace Evans, Manager, Commonwealth Shipping Service, Papua and New Guinea.
- Rhoda Mary Felgate. For services rendered in connection with theatre in Australia.
- Clarence Brace Taylor Gates, President of the Australian Corriedale Sheep Breeders' Association.
- Charlotte Maude Jackson. For services rendered in connection with patriotic and charitable movements in Australia.
- Eileen Mary Delia Johnston. For social welfare services rendered under the auspices of the Red Cross and other movements in Australia.
- Esmond Gerald (Tom) Kruse, of Marree, South Australia. For services to the community in the outback.
- Frederick Laby. For public services in Australia.
- John Michael Landy. For services to Amateur Athletics in Australia.
- John Norman (Senior). For public services in Australia.
- Hugh Michael O'Rorke. For public services in Australia, especially in connection with brush fire flighting.
- William Leopold Rush, Commonwealth Public Service Inspector, Victoria.
- George Logie-Smith. For services to Music in Australia.
- Lily Constance Taylor. For social welfare services, especially to ex-servicemen, in Australia.
- The Reverend Harry Reginald Brodie Thorpe. For social welfare services, especially to Australian servicemen.

=== British Empire Medal (BEM) ===
Military Division

Australian Military Forces

- 5/849 Private (temporary Corporal) Raymond Stephen Bartley, Royal Corps of Australian Electrical and Mechanical Engineers.
- 3/3656 Sergeant Donald William Dawson, Royal Australian Corps of Signals.
- 3/996 Staff-Sergeant William Laurence Kendall, Royal Australian Army Service Corps.
- 4/21472 Staff-Sergeant Maxwell William Pearson, Royal Australian Infantry Corps.
- 3/72678 Sergeant Ian William James Robertson, Royal Australian Infantry Corps.
- 2/45874 Sergeant (temporary Staff-Sergeant) Frank William Robinson, Royal Australian Engineers.
- 2/1649 Sergeant George William Lester Tropman, Royal Australian Army Service Corps.
- 3/123284 Sergeant (temporary Warrant Officer (Class II) Ronald Frank Woodward, Royal Australian Artillery.

Royal Australian Air Force

- A.610 Sergeant William Robert Austin.
- A.2964 Sergeant Edward Oliver Deas.
- A.24291 Sergeant Frank William Morgan.

=== Royal Red Cross (RRC) ===
- Lieutenant-Colonel (honorary Colonel) Ethel Jessie Bowe, ARRC, (F3/31), Matron-in-Chief, Royal Australian Army Nursing Corps.

=== Air Force Cross (AFC) ===
Royal Australian Air Force

- Squadron Leader Charles Walter Brackenridge (011381).
- Squadron Leader William Roy Fitter (022041).
- Squadron Leader James Anthony Rowland, DFC, (022056).
- Flight Lieutenant Douglas Walter Leckie (034446).

=== Queen's Commendation for Valuable Service in the Air ===
- Flight Lieutenant Jack Darby Espie (033153), Royal Australian Air Force.

== Ceylon ==
=== Knight Bachelor ===
- Warusahennedige Leo Fernando, CBE, Member of Parliament for Buttala. (Died 30 November 1954. Her Majesty's approval of this Knighthood was signified on 29 October 1954.)

=== Order of Saint Michael and Saint George ===
==== Knight Commander of the Order of St Michael and St George (KCMG) ====
- Sir Arunachalam Mahadeva, Member, Public Service Commission.

==== Companion of the Order of St Michael and St George (CMG) ====
- Nandasara Wijetilaka Atukorala, CBE, Secretary to the Governor-General.
- Cyril Francis Fernando, OBE, MRCS, LRCP, Medical Officer and Physician, General Hospital, Colombo.
- Pararajasingam Nadesan, OBE, Secretary to the Prime Minister.
- Benjamin Franklin Perera, OBE, Permanent Secretary, Ministry of Home Affairs.

=== Order of the British Empire ===
==== Commander of the Order of the British Empire (CBE) ====
Civil Division

- Mihidukulasuriya Guruge Joseph Michael De Livera. For social services in Negombo.
- Dhanusekera Bandara Ellepola, MBE. For public services.
- Thusew Samuel Fernando, QC, Solicitor-General.

==== Officer of the Order of the British Empire (OBE) ====
Civil Division

- Manikuwadumestrige Chandrasoma, Principal Collector of Customs, Colombo Port Commission.
- Weliwaittage Liveris Perera Dassanayake, LRCP&S, Superintendent, Filariasis Campaign.
- George Rajanayagam Handy, MD, MRCP, Visiting Physician, General Hospital, Colombo.
- Thomas David Jayasuriya, MBE, Director of Education.
- Kandiah Mahendra. For public services.
- Cecil Alexander Speldewinde, Commissioner of Income Tax, Estate Duty and Stamps.
- Joseph Nicholas Cecil Tiruchelvam, MBE, JP, City Coroner, Colombo.
- Joseph Salvadore Victoria, MVO. For services to Commerce.

==== Member of the Order of the British Empire (MBE) ====
Military Division

- Captain Alexander Joseph Zosimus Navaratne, Ceylon Army Medical Corps.
- Captain Weerasena Rajapakse, Ceylon Light Infantry.

Civil Division

- Thomas Frederick Blaze, JP, Crown Proctor, Badulla.
- Leslie Vernon Cooray, Secretary, Ceylon Savings Bank.
- Dalrymple Nandalochana Wickremaratne De Silva, Member, Colombo Municipal Council.
- Eardley Charles D'Silva, Secretary to the Leader of the House of Representatives, and Chief Government Whip.
- James Vethanayagam Feldano. For social services in Mannar.
- Somawira Gunasekera. For services to Sport.
- Lucien Arnold Gunesekera, Medical Practitioner, Colombo.
- Seiyadu Ibrahim Saibo Hameed. For public services in the North-West Province.
- Al-Haj Mohamed Ismail Mohamed Haniffa. For services to the Muslim community.
- Jiwatfam Towrmal Hirdaramani. For public services in Colombo.
- Mudhalithamby Mappanar Kulasekaram, Vice-Principal, Royal College, Colombo.
- Francis John Aloysius Ponrajah. For public services in Mannar.
- Avis Enid Raffel. For social services.
- Vithana Aratchige Sugathadasa, Member, Colombo Municipal Council.
- Arthur van Langenberg, Secretary, Colombo Port Commission.

=== British Empire Medal (BEM) ===
Civil Division

- Henry Edward William De Zylva, Clerk, Governor-General's Office.
- Cornelius Walter Staniforth Gunawardana, Chief Clerk, Public Service Commission.
- Francis Samarasinghe, Chief Clerk, Prime Minister's Office.
- Francis Philip Rodrdgp Sathianathen, Stenographer, Prime Minister's Office.

== Pakistan ==
=== Order of Saint Michael and Saint George ===
==== Companion of the Order of St Michael and St George (CMG) ====
- Geoffrey Burgess, Director, Civil Service Academy.

=== Order of the British Empire ===
==== Knight Commander of the Order of the British Empire (KBE) ====
Military Division

- Major-General Stuart Greeves, CB, CBE, DSO, MC, British Service (Special List).

==== Commander of the Order of the British Empire (CBE) ====
Military Division

- Colonel (temporary) Sidney Victor Parsons, OBE, British Service (Special List).

Civil Division

- Lieutenant-Colonel Roger Noel Bacon, OBE, Manager, Sugar Mills, Mardan, North-West Frontier Province.
- William Stirling Hall, Superintending Engineer, Lower Sind Barrage.
- Alexander William Redpath, Deputy Secretary, Central Organisation and Methods Unit.
- William Leonard O'Brien Stallard, OBE, deputy director, Intelligence Bureau.

==== Officer of the Order of the British Empire (OBE) ====
Military Division

- Acting Commander Cuthbert Richard Purse, DSC, Royal Navy.
- Lieutenant-Colonel (temporary) Willoughby Major Goddard-Fenwick, MBE, Corps of Royal Electrical and Mechanical Engineers.
- Lieutenant-Colonel (temporary) Herbert Waring, British Service (Special List).

Civil Division

- Thomas Henry Matthewman, Principal, Engineering College, Dacca.
- David Khalid Power, District Magistrate, Mymensingh.

==== Member of the Order of the British Empire (MBE) ====
Military Division

- Warrant Officer I William Allison, Corps of Royal Electrical and Mechanical Engineers.
- Major Francis Thomas Carless, British Service (Special List).
- Major (temporary) Claude Cheesman, British Service (Special List).
- Squadron Leader Basil Charles Johnson (49453), Royal Air Force.

Civil Division

- Kathleen Alexander, Nursing Sister, Lady Reading Hospital, Peshawar.
- Luce George Asquith, Divisional Personnel Officer, North-Western Railway.
- Frederick Thomas Dobson, Works Manager, Non-Ferrous Factory, Ordnance Factories, Wah.
- John William Douglas, Dock Master, Karachi Port Trust.
- Donald Anthony Michael McDonald, Works Manager, Pakistan Mint, Lahore.
- Donald Iain Mackinnon, Principal, Technical Training Centre, Lahore.

=== British Empire Medal (BEM) ===
Military Division

- 629300 Acting Flight Sergeant Eric Edmund Brailsford, Royal Air Force.
- 641773 Sergeant Michael James Gorman, Royal Air Force.
