= 1951 Birthday Honours =

British government recognitions

The King's Birthday Honours 1951 were appointments in many of the Commonwealth realms of King George VI to various orders and honours to reward and highlight good works by citizens of those countries. The appointments were made to celebrate the official birthday of the King, and were published on 1 June 1951 for the British Empire, Australia, New Zealand, Ceylon, and Pakistan. These were the last Birthday Honours awarded by George VI, who died eight months later.

The recipients of honours are displayed here as they were styled before their new honour, and arranged by honour, with classes (Knight, Knight Grand Cross, etc.) and then divisions (Military, Civil, etc.) as appropriate.

== British Empire ==
=== Baron ===
- Lieutenant-General Sir Bernard Cyril Freyberg, VC GCMG KCB KBE DSO DCL LLD, Governor-General of New Zealand.
- Alderman Valentine La Touche McEntee, CBE, Member of Parliament for West Walthamstow, 1922-1924 and 1929-1950. For political and public services.
- Ernest Albert Whitfield, PhD. For political and public services.

=== Privy Councillor ===
- David Rhys Grenfell, CBE JP MP, Member of Parliament for the Gower Division of Glamorganshire since 1922. Secretary for Mines, 1940-1942. For political and public services.
- The Honourable Kenneth Gilmour Younger, MP, Member of Parliament for Grimsby since 1945. Parliamentary Under-Secretary of State, Home Office, 1947-50. Minister of State since 1950.

=== Baronet ===
- Alderman Denys Colquhoun Flowerdew Lowson, Lord Mayor of London.

=== Knight Bachelor ===
- David Anderson, LLD MICE, Senior Partner, Mott, Hay and Anderson.
- George Wilfrid Anson, MBE MC JP, Deputy Chairman, Imperial Tobacco Co. (of Great Britain & Ireland) Ltd.
- Gerald Reid Barry, Director-General, Festival of Britain, 1951.
- Ernest Bullock, CVO MusD FRCM FRCO, Gardiner Professor of Music in the University of Glasgow, and Principal, Royal Scottish Academy of Music, Glasgow.
- Christopher John Chancellor, CMG, General Manager, Reuters Ltd.
- Osmund Somers Cleverly, CB CVO, Permanent Commissioner of Crown Lands.
- Albert Cecil Dawes, CBE, Legal Adviser, Ministry of Education.
- Roger Duncalfe, Chairman of the British Standards Institution.
- Charles Arthur Lovatt Evans, DSc LLD FRCP FRS, Emeritus Professor of Physiology, University of London.
- Lieutenant-General John Fullerton Evetts, CB CBE MC (Ret'd.), Head of United Kingdom Ministry of Supply Staff in the Commonwealth of Australia.
- Reginald Daniel Fennelly, CB, Under-Secretary, Board of Trade.
- Ernest Frederick Finch, MD MS FRCS. For services to surgery and medical education.
- Edward Otho Glover, Chairman, Cheshire County Council.
- George Rostrevor Hamilton, Presiding Special Commissioner of Income Tax, Board of Inland Revenue.
- Bernard Guy Harrison, Chairman, Harrison & Sons Ltd. Member of Council, London Master Printers Association.
- Reginald John Hodges, General Manager and Secretary, Mersey Docks and Harbour Board.
- Councillor William Ernest George Johnston, DL, Lord Mayor of Belfast.
- Sydney Charles Thomas Littlewood, Chairman, Legal Aid Committee of The Law Society.
- Lionel Harold Harvey Lowe, FCA, Member of the National Coal Board.
- John William McNee, DSO DSc MD FRCP, Regius Professor of Medicine, University of Glasgow.
- John Ure Primrose, Lord Provost of Perth.
- Eric Keightley Rideal, MBE DSc FRIC FRS, Professor of Chemistry, King's College London. President of the Chemical Society.
- Richard Snedden, CBE, General Manager, Shipping Federation and International Shipping Federation.
- Captain Henry Study, CBE, Chief Constable, West Riding of Yorkshire.
- Godfrey Seymour Tearle. For services to the dramatic profession.
- Henry William Hugh Warren, DSc MIEE MIMechE, Managing Director, Associated Electrical Industries Ltd.
- Harold Herbert Williams, FBA FSA JP. For services to local government in Hertfordshire and to bibliography.
- John Lias Cecil Cecil-Williams, Honorary Secretary of the Honourable Society of Cymmrodorion.
- James Reid Young, Director, Vickers Ltd., and Vickers-Armstrongs Ltd.

State of Victoria

- The Honourable Albert Eli Lind, MLA. For public services.

State of South Australia

- Philip Santo Messent, MS MB FRACS, Director of Surgical Studies, University of Adelaide.

State of Western Australia

- The Honourable Harold Seddon, President of the Legislative Council.

Commonwealth Services

- Henry Ernest Turner, CBE, Secretary of the Commonwealth Press Union.

Colonies, Protectorates, Etc.

- Oswald Lawrence Bancroft, Colonial Legal Service, Chief Justice, Bahamas.
- John William Cox, CBE, Speaker of House of Assembly, Bermuda.
- Dudley Gordon Leacock. For public services in Barbados.
- Ernest Rex Edward Surridge, CMG, Colonial Administrative Service, Chief Secretary, Tanganyika.
- Stafford William Powell Foster-Sutton, CMG OBE, Colonial Legal Service, Chief Justice designate, Federation of Malaya.

=== Order of the Bath ===
==== Knight Grand Cross of the Order of the Bath (GCB) ====
Military Division

Army

- General Sir John Harding, KCB CBE DSO MC ADC, (12247), late Infantry.

Civil Division

- Sir Norman Craven Brook, KCB, Secretary of the Cabinet.

==== Knight Commander of the Order of the Bath (KCB) ====
Military Division

Royal Navy

- Vice-Admiral Alexander Cumming Gordon Madden, CB CBE.
- General Sir Leslie Chasemore Hollis, KBE CB, Royal Marines.

Army

- General Sir Gerald Walter Robert Templer, KBE CB CMG DSO (15307), late Infantry, Colonel, The Royal Irish Fusiliers.
- Major-General Sir Stewart Graham Menzies, KCMG CB DSO MC (6305), late The Life Guards.

Royal Air Force

- Air Chief Marshal Sir William Elliot, KBE CB DFC ADC.
- Air Chief Marshal Sir Hugh Pughe Lloyd, KBE CB MC DFC.
- Air Chief Marshal Sir George Clark Pirie, KBE CB MC DFC LLD.

Civil Division

- Thomas Downing Kendrick, DLitt FBA FSA, Director and Principal Librarian, British Museum.
- Sir Edwin Noel Plowden, KBE, Chief Planning Officer, HM Treasury.

==== Companion of the Order of the Bath (CB) ====
Military Division

Royal Navy

- Rear-Admiral Edward Michael Conolly Abel Smith, CVO.
- Rear-Admiral (E) Sydney Brown.
- Rear-Admiral Ian Murray Robertson Campbell, DSO
- Rear-Admiral Archibald Day, CBE DSO.
- Rear-Admiral Hugh Webb Faulkner, CBE DSO.
- Rear-Admiral Reginald Maurice James Hutton, CBE DSO.
- Rear-Admiral Sydney Moffat Raw, CBE.
- Rear-Admiral John Felgate Stevens, CBE

Army

- Brigadier Basil Charles Davey, CBE (14351), late Corps of Royal Engineers.
- Brigadier Cecil Leonard Basil Duke, MC (11442), late Corps of Royal Engineers.
- Major-General Charles Edward Anson Firth, CBE DSO (24722), late Infantry.
- Major-General George Frederick Johnson, CBE DSO (28480), late Foot Guards.
- Major-General Stanley William Joslin, CBE MA MIMechE MIEE (15843), Corps of Royal Electrical and Mechanical Engineers.
- Major-General John Mandeville Macfie, CBE MC, MB, KHS (14140), late Royal Army Medical Corps.
- Major-General Reginald Laurence Scoones, DSO OBE (490), late Royal Armoured Corps.
- Major-General Anthony Gerald O'Carroll Scott, CBE (15558), late Royal Regiment of Artillery.
- Major-General Stephen Newton Shoosmith, DSO OBE (18052), late Royal Regiment of Artillery.
- Brigadier (temporary) Eric Keir Gilborne Sixsmith, CBE (30697), late Infantry.
- Major-General George Alexander Neville Swiney, CBE MC (10754), Royal Army Ordnance Corps.
- Major-General (temporary) Michael Montgomerie Alston-Roberts-West, DSO (33582), late Infantry.
- Major-General (temporary) Percival Napier White, CBE (619), late Infantry.

Royal Air Force

- Air Vice-Marshal Thomas Geoffrey Bowler, CBE, (Ret'd.).
- Air Vice-Marshal Narbrough Hughes D'Aeth, CBE.
- Air Vice-Marshal Somerled Douglas Macdonald, CBE DFC.
- Air Commodore Owen Washington de Putron, CBE ADC.
- Air Commodore Andrew McKee, CBE DSO DFC AFC.
- Air Commodore Wilfred Wynter-Morgan, CBE MC.

Civil Division

- Ernest Edmond Bailey, CBE DPhil, Under-Secretary, Ministry of Food.
- Harold Robert Camp, Under-Secretary, Ministry of Supply.
- Ian Vincent Hamilton Campbell, Assistant Under-Secretary of State, Air Ministry.
- William Arthur Harvey Druitt, Principal Assistant Solicitor, Department of HM Procurator General and Treasury Solicitor.
- Edward Michael Tyndall Firth, Under-Secretary, Ministry of Health.
- Colonel (Honorary Brigadier) John Linnaeus French, CBE TD DL, Chairman, Territorial and Auxiliary Forces Association, County of Essex.
- Victor Martin Reeves Goodman, OBE MC, Reading Clerk and Principal Clerk, Judicial Office, House of Lords.
- Thomas Emlyn Harris, CBE MIMechE MIEE, Chief Superintendent, Royal Ordnance Factory, Woolwich.
- Colonel Frank Hibbert, CBE MC TD DL MEng MICE, Chairman, Territorial and Auxiliary Forces Association, County of Lancaster (West).
- George Fletcher Riley Marsh, Director of Stores, Admiralty.
- Gilbert John Nash, Under-Secretary, Ministry of Labour & National Service.
- Hugh Ellis-Rees, CMG, Under-Secretary, HM Treasury.
- William Thomas, DSc PhD, Chief Inspector for Wales, Ministry of Education.
- Hugh Edmund Watts, MBE GM FRIC, HM Chief Inspector of Explosives, Home Office.
- John Robert Willis, MC, Under-Secretary, Ministry of Transport.

=== Order of Merit (OM) ===
- Professor George Edward Moore, LittD LLD.

=== Order of Saint Michael and Saint George ===
==== Knight Grand Cross of the Order of St Michael and St George (GCMG) ====
- Lieutenant-General Sir Archibald Edward Nye, GCSI GCIE KCB KBE MC, High Commissioner in India for His Majesty's Government in the United Kingdom.
- Sir Alexander Grantham, KCMG, Governor and Commander-in-Chief, Hong Kong.
- Sir Thomas Ingram Kynaston Lloyd, KCB KCMG, Permanent Under-Secretary of State, Colonial Office.
- Sir Edmund Leo Hall-Patch, KCMG, Permanent United Kingdom Representative on the Organisation for European Economic Co-operation at Paris.

==== Knight Commander of the Order of St Michael and St George (KCMG) ====
- Geoffrey Fletcher Clay, CMG OBE MC, Agricultural Adviser to the Secretary of State for the Colonies.
- Sir Herbert Ralph Hone, KBE MC TD, Governor and Commander-in-Chief, North Borneo.
- Christopher Eden Steel, CMG MVO, Minister at His Majesty's Embassy at Washington.
- Christopher Frederick Ashton Warner, CMG, His Majesty's Ambassador Extraordinary and Plenipotentiary (designate) to Belgium.
- Michael Robert Wright, CMG, His Majesty's Ambassador Extraordinary and Plenipotentiary at Oslo.

Honorary Knight Commander

- Sultan Ismail Nasiruddin Shah, CMG, ibni Sultan Zainal Abidin, His Highness the Sultan of Terengganu, Federation of Malaya.

==== Companion of the Order of St Michael and St George (CMG) ====
- Edgar Abraham Cohen, Under-Secretary, Board of Trade.
- Robert Stewart Crawford, Assistant Secretary, Foreign Office, German Section.
- Hubert Alexander Gill, Chartered Patent Agent. For services at international conferences on industrial property.
- Leslie Benton Green, OBE, Tea Controller for India, Ministry of Food.
- Arthur Patterson, Assistant Secretary, Ministry of National Insurance. For services in negotiating reciprocal agreements with other Governments.
- Herbert John Seddon, DM FRCS, Member of the Colonial Advisory Medical Committee. Clinical Director of the Royal National Orthopaedic Hospital.
- Robert Richardson Burnett, CIE OBE, Deputy High Commissioner in Pakistan for His Majesty's Government in the United Kingdom.
- Ferdinand Caire Drew, FICA, Under-Treasurer, State of South Australia.
- Robert Gordon Aikman, Colonial Administrative Service, Chief Secretary, Sarawak.
- Robert Edmund Alford, Colonial Administrative Service, Financial Secretary, Zanzibar.
- Geoffrey Bernard Beckett, Member for Agriculture & Natural Resources, Northern Rhodesia.
- Wilfred Henry Chinn, Adviser on Social Welfare to the Secretary of State for the Colonies.
- John Merrill Cruikshank, OBE MD, Colonial Medical Service, Director of Medical Services, Fiji, and Inspector-General, South Pacific Health Service.
- William Evans. For public services in Kenya.
- John William Field, MD MB ChB, Colonial Medical Service, Director, Institute for Medical Research, Federation of Malaya.
- Hugh Brown Hamilton. For public services in Kenya.
- Eric Himsworth, Colonial Administrative Service, Financial Secretary, Nigeria.
- Reginald Harry Saloway, CIE OBE, Colonial Administrative Service, Chief Secretary and Minister of Defence & External Affairs, Gold Coast.
- Cyril Charles Spencer. Colonial Administrative Service, Financial Secretary, Uganda.
- Ivor Herbert Evelyn Joseph Stourton, OBE, Colonial Police Service, Commissioner of Police, Nigeria.
- Ambler Reginald Thomas, Establishment and Organisation Officer, Colonial Office.
- Brigadier James Francis Benoy, CBE, Deputy Director-General, Foreign Office, Administration of African Territories.
- Colonel Geoffrey Ronald Codrington, CB CVO DSO OBE, Head of the Conference and Supply Department, Foreign Office.
- Michael Cavenagh Gillett, Counsellor at His Majesty's Embassy in Peking.
- Paul Francis Grey, Counsellor at His Majesty's Embassy in Lisbon.
- Kenneth Davis Druitt Henderson, Governor, Darfur Province, Sudan.
- Charles Alan Gerald de Jussieu Meade, Counsellor at His Majesty's Embassy at Washington.
- Thomas Godric Aylett Muntz, OBE, Head of the Economic Relations Department, Foreign Office.
- Harold Wilfrid Armine Freese-Pennefather, Counsellor at His Majesty's Embassy at Rangoon.
- Thomas Corney Ravensdale, Political Adviser to the British Resident, Benghazi, Cyrenaica, lately Oriental Counsellor at His Majesty's Embassy in Cairo.
- John Walker, OBE, Counsellor (Commercial) at His Majesty's Embassy in Tehran.
- George Peregrine Young, Head of the Western Department, Foreign Office.

Honorary Companion

- Sharif Husein, OBE, bin Ahmed Am Muhsin Al Habili, Regent to the Sharif of Beihan, Aden.

=== Royal Victorian Order ===
==== Knight Commander of the Royal Victorian Order (KCVO) ====
- Major Michael Edward Adeane, CB MVO.
- Sir Eric Cyril Egerton Leadbitter, CVO.
- Geoffrey Sydney Todd, CVO OBE MB ChM FRCP.

==== Commander of the Royal Victorian Order (CVO) ====
- Alexander Greig Anderson, MD ChB FRCP.
- George Ritchie Mather Cordiner, MB ChB DMRE.
- Harold Roberts.
- James William Watkins, DSO MC.

==== Member of the Royal Victorian Order, 4th class (MVO) ====
- Major Michael Babington Charles Hawkins, MBE.

==== Member of the Royal Victorian Order, 5th class (MVO) ====
- Charles George Drake.
- Lilian Edith Gascon Luker.

=== Order of the British Empire ===
==== Knight Grand Cross of the Order of the British Empire (GBE) ====
Military Division

- General Sir Neil Methuen Ritchie, KCB KBE DSO MC ADC (9334), late Infantry, Colonel, The Black Watch (Royal Highland Regiment).

Civil Division

- The Right Honourable Robert Alexander, Earl of Crawford and Balcarres. For services to the Arts.

==== Dame Commander of the Order of the British Empire (DBE) ====
Civil Division

- Florence May Hancock, CBE, National Woman Officer, Transport & General Workers Union.
- Professor Hilda Nora Lloyd, MB ChB FRCS, President, Royal College of Obstetricians and Gynaecologists.
- Professor Lillian Margery Penson, LLD DLitt PhD, Vice-Chancellor of the University of London.
- The Honourable Florence Cardell-Oliver, Minister for Health, and Supply and Shipping, State of Western Australia.

==== Knight Commander of the Order of the British Empire (KBE) ====
Military Division

Royal Navy

- Vice-Admiral Henry William Urquhart McCall, CB DSO.
- Rear-Admiral (E) William Scarlett Jameson, CB CBE.

Army

- Lieutenant-General Charles Falkland Loewen, CB CBE DSO (17987), late Royal Regiment of Artillery.
- Lieutenant-General Euan Alfred Bews Miller, CB DSO MC (11736), late Infantry.
- Major-General Cecil Miller Smith, CB CBE MC AMIMechE (10540), late Royal Army Service Corps (now retired).

Royal Air Force

- Air Marshal Ronald Ivelaw-Chapman, CB CBE DFC AFC.
- Acting Air Marshal John Nelson Boothman, CB DFC AFC.

Civil Division

- Sir Frederick William Leggett, CB. For services relating to the conditions of industrial employment.
- Alfred Sutherland Le Maitre, CB MC, Controller of Ground Services, Ministry of Civil Aviation.
- Hamish Duncan Maclaren, CB DFC MIEE, Director of Electrical Engineering, Admiralty.
- The Right Honourable Thomas Godfrey Polson, Baron Rowallan, MC TD DL, Chief Scout, British Commonwealth & Empire.
- William Kershaw Slater, DSc FRIC, Secretary, Agricultural Research Council.
- Sir (Alexander) Percival Waterfield, CB, lately First Commissioner, Civil Service Commission.
- Charles Cecil George Cumings, Legal Secretary, Sudan Government.
- Robert Allason Furness, CMG CBE, British subject resident in Egypt.
- Sir John Harry Barclay Nihill, KC MC, Colonial Legal Service, President of the East African Court of Appeal.
- John Leonard Worlledge, CMG, Director General of Colonial Audit.

==== Commander of the Order of the British Empire (CBE) ====
Military Division

Royal Navy

- Acting Captain The Honourable Richard Duke Coleridge, OBE, (Ret'd.)
- Colonel Richard Frank Cornwall, OBE, Royal Marines.
- Captain (S) Clement Edward Glenister, OBE.
- Rear-Admiral (E) Humfrey John Bradley Moore.
- Captain (L) Kenyon Harry Terrell Peard, ADC AMIEE.
- Acting Captain Montague Christopher Teasdale-Buckell, (Ret'd.)

Army

- Brigadier (temporary) John Edmund Alexander Baird, OBE (17808), Employed List (late The Royal Inniskilling Fusiliers).
- Colonel Joseph Hector Dealy Bennett, OBE (22465), late Corps of Royal Engineers.
- Brigadier (temporary) Harry Haywood Blanchard, OBE (97642), Royal Pioneer Corps.
- Brigadier Henry Patrick Cavendish, DSO, OBE (18783), late Corps of Royal Engineers.
- Brigadier (temporary) William Thomas Cobb, OBE MC (13845), Royal Army Ordnance Corps.
- Colonel William Alexander Duncan Drummond, OBE FRCS (31405), late Royal Army Medical Corps.
- Brigadier (temporary) Cecil Llewellyn Firbank, DSO (28072), late Infantry.
- Brigadier (temporary) Eneas Henry George Grant, DSO MC (18829), late Infantry.
- Colonel (temporary) Cecil Tait Hutchison, MC (9099), Royal Regiment of Artillery.
- Brigadier Walter Watson Alexander Loring. Special List (ex-Indian Army) (now retired).
- Brigadier (temporary) Alexander George Victor Paley, DSO, OBE (23862), late Infantry.
- Brigadier Ernest Merrill Ransford (13084), late Infantry.
- Colonel and Chief Paymaster Owen Patrick James Rooney, OBE (17894), Royal Army Pay Corps.
- Brigadier Edwin Kenneth Page, DSO OBE MC (13491), late Royal Regiment of Artillery, Commander, Caribbean Area.

Royal Air Force

- Air Vice-Marshal William Edward Barnes, MRCS LRCP DTM&H.
- Air Commodore Hugh Hamilton Brookes, DFC.
- Air Commodore John Darcy Baker-Carr, AFC.
- Group Captain Denis Ivor Coote.
- Group Captain John Norman Jefferson.
- Group Captain William Maxwell Cassilis Kennedy.
- Group Captain Ernest Lawrence Geoffrey Le Dieu, OBE.
- Group Captain Mervyn Francis Douglas Williams, DSO.

Civil Division

- Patrick Aherne, Director of Audit, Exchequer and Audit Department.
- James Alexander, General Manager and Secretary, Belfast Harbour Commissioners.
- Lionel George Helmore Alldridge, OBE FRICS JP, Alderman, Birmingham City Council.
- Joseph Herbert Alpass, Member of Parliament for Bristol Central, 1929-1931, and for the Thornbury Division of Gloucestershire, 1945-1950. For political and public services.
- Stanley Anderson, RA RE, Engraver.
- Captain Albert Andrew Andrews, OBE, Controller, Sailors', Soldiers' & Airmen's Families Association.
- Peggy Ashcroft, Actress.
- William George Askew, OBE, Secretary, St. Dunstan's. For services to the blind.
- Charles Herbert Aslin, FRIBA, County Architect of Hertfordshire.
- William Ringrose Gelston Atkins, OBE ScD FRIC FRS, Head of Department of General Physiology, Plymouth Laboratory, Marine Biological Association.
- Isobel Baillie, Soprano.
- Thomas MacDonald Baker, TD DL, Solicitor to the Metropolitan Police.
- Frank Barraclough, Chief Education Officer, North Riding of Yorkshire.
- Thomas Beaton, OBE MD FRCP, Medical Superintendent, St James' Hospital, Portsmouth.
- John Colburn Bennett, Director, Henry Gardner & Co. Ltd.
- Edmund Cecil Bevers, MB BCh FRCS FRCS(Ed) LRCP, lately Chairman, United Oxford Hospitals.
- Andrew Black, Director of Acquisitions, British Transport Commission.
- Harry Richard Blanford, OBE, Editor-Secretary, Empire Forestry Association.
- Edmund Charles Blunden, MC, Author.
- Harry Bradley, Director of Research, British Boot, Shoe and Allied Trades Research Association.
- William Kenneth Brasher, MIEE, Secretary, Institution of Electrical Engineers.
- Alastair Henry Bruce, DL, President, British Paper & Board Manufacturers' Association.
- Hugh Hanton Burness, MC PhD, Assistant Secretary, Ministry of Education.
- Ivy Compton-Burnett, Author.
- Air Commodore Richard Cadman, DL, Royal Auxiliary Air Force, Vice-Chairman, Territorial and Auxiliary Forces Association of the County of Glamorgan.
- Arthur Gemmell Carswell, FRICS, Chairman, Cheshire Agricultural Executive Committee.
- Harold Thomas Chapman, MIMechE FRAeS, Managing Director, Armstrong Siddeley Motors Ltd., Coventry.
- Henry Buckley Charlton, LittD, Professor of English Literature, University of Manchester.
- Walter Henry Chatten, MIEE, Assistant Director of Dockyards, Admiralty.
- Walter George Clements, MC, Assistant Secretary, Air Ministry.
- Alexander Cree, OBE, Regional Controller, Ministry of National Insurance.
- Edward Crowther, MEng MICE, Chairman, Northern Gas Board.
- Professor Gordon Miller Bourne Dobson, DSc FRS, Reader in Meteorology, University of Oxford.
- George Foster Earle, Chairman and a Managing Director, Associated Portland Cement Manufacturers Ltd.
- Alan Neville East, MIEE MIMechE AMICE, Chief Engineering Inspector, Ministry of Fuel & Power.
- Frank Sandford Eastwood, Chairman of the Licensing Authorities for Public Service and Goods Vehicles, Yorkshire Area, Ministry of Transport.
- John Wilson Elliott, Chairman, Swan, Hunter & Wigham Richardson Ltd.
- Arthur James Espley, OBE JP. For services as a member of Courts of Inquiry under the Industrial Courts Act.
- Evan Stanley Evans, MD BS FRCS, Chairman, Queen Elizabeth Training College for the Disabled, Leatherhead.
- Alfred John Fairbank, Calligrapher.
- Margot Fonteyn. For services to the ballet.
- Colonel Jesse Gardiner, Regional Director, Scotland, General Post Office.
- George William Hoggan Gardner, MIMechE FRAeS, Director of Guided Weapons Research & Development, Ministry of Supply.
- Leslie Harold Gorsuch, Assistant Secretary, Colonial Office.
- Alderman Archibald Cozens-Hardy. For public services in Norfolk.
- George William Harriman, OBE, Deputy Managing Director, Austin Motor Co. Ltd.
- Frank Young Henderson, DSc, Director, Forest Products Research Laboratory, Department of Scientific and Industrial Research.
- Henry Andrews Hepburn, MIMechE, Deputy Chief Inspector of Factories, Ministry of Labour & National Service.
- Professor Austin Bradford Hill, DSc PhD, Consultant in Medical Statistics to the Royal Air Force.
- Ernest John Holland, OBE, Director of Army Contracts, War Office.
- Leonard Hooper, Foreign Office.
- Alan Dudley Hough, MC, lately Senior Assistant Controller, Paper Control, Board of Trade.
- Leonard Howles, MIEE, Chairman, South Wales Electricity Board.
- Brigadier Reginald Vernon Hume, OBE TD, Deputy Land Commissioner, Control Commission for Germany, British Element.
- Professor Daniel Thomson Jack, Chairman of the Newcastle upon Tyne Local Employment Committee and of Wages Boards and Councils.
- Gilbert Kemsley, Chairman, Essex County Agricultural Executive Committee.
- Robert Terence Kennedy, ARIBA, Chief Planning Officer, Ministry of Local Government & Planning.
- Victor Albert George Lambert, OBE MIMechE, Director-General, Armament Production, Ministry of Supply.
- James Laver, Keeper of the Departments of Engraving, Illustration and Design, and of Paintings, Victoria & Albert Museum.
- John Henry Francis Ludgate, Assistant Secretary, Ministry of Pensions.
- Alexander MacDonald, Member, Central Land Board & War Damage Commission.
- William David Marshall, Regional Director, Manchester, Ministry of Works.
- Aubrey Rollo Ibbetson Mellor, MC, Member and former Chairman, Executive Committee, Colonial Employers' Federation.
- Joseph Stanley Mitchell, MB BChir PhD, Professor of Radiotherapeutics, University of Cambridge.
- John Elson Sinclair Nisbet, Vice Convener of Roxburgh County Council.
- Arthur Harold Noble. For public services in the County of Londonderry.
- Joseph Houldsworth Oldham, DD. For services to educational and religious organisations.
- Walter Thomas Ottway, Chairman and Managing Director, W. Ottway & Co. Ltd., Ealing.
- Sidney Parkinson, Secretary, Public Works Loan Board.
- David James Parry, Clerk of the County Council and Clerk of the Peace for the County of Glamorgan.
- George Richard Parsons, Assistant Secretary, General Post Office.
- William Edward Willoughby Petter, FRAeS, Deputy Managing Director, Folland Aircraft Ltd., Hamble, Hampshire.
- Charles Frank Sidney Plumbley, OBE, Deputy Controller, HM Stationery Office.
- James Samuel Richard Doke Rawcliffe, Senior Registrar, HM Land Registry.
- Richard Antony Rendall, Lately Controller of Talks, British Broadcasting Corporation.
- Ernest Hamilton Richards, Assistant Solicitor, Ministry of Labour & National Service.
- Alexander Gordon Ritchie, Assistant Secretary, Ministry of Works.
- Hubert Oscar Roberts, Ministry of Transport, Freight Market Representative.
- Adrian Lynch-Robinson, Permanent Secretary, Ministry of Home Affairs, Northern Ireland.
- James Stiven Ross, MA, Principal of Westminster College.
- Owen Jenny Sangar, MC, Director of Forestry for England, Forestry Commission.
- James Jamieson Seager, JP, Managing Editor of the Edinburgh Evening News.
- Thomas Wilfrid Sharp, DLitt, President of the Institute of Landscape Architects.
- Alderman Andrew Smith, JP, Vice-Chairman, Lancashire Education Committee.
- Thomas George Edmond-Smith, MBE, Assistant Secretary, Board of Customs & Excise.
- Thomas Stanes, Assistant Secretary, Ministry of Supply.
- Horace James Stevens, Senior Principal Inspector of Taxes, Board of Inland Revenue.
- Matthew John Stewart, LLD MB ChB FRCP FRFPS, Emeritus Professor of Pathology, University of Leeds.
- John Stirling, FSAA, Chief Accountant, Department of Health for Scotland.
- Robert Thompson Douglas Stoneham, Chairman, London Retail Milk Distributive Wartime Association.
- Philippa Strachey, Honorary Secretary, London and National Society for Women's Service.
- Edwin Lawrance Sturdee, OBE MRCS LRCP, Principal Medical Officer, Ministry of Health.
- William Johnson Taylor, OBE JP DL MP, Member of the Air Cadet Council, Chairman of Committee, No. 148 (Barnsley) Squadron, Air Training Corps.
- Archibald Angus Templeton, MBE JP, County Clerk of Dunbartonshire.
- Arnold Titherley, Assistant Secretary, Ministry of Local Government & Planning.
- Alfred George Tomkins, OBE, Joint Honorary Secretary, British Furniture Trade Joint Industrial Council.
- George Elmslie Troup, Chairman, Scottish Association of Boys' Clubs.
- Herbert Twinch, OBE, lately Chief Livestock Husbandry Officer in the National Agricultural Advisory Service.
- William Harris Valentine, Jute Controller, Board of Trade.
- Professor James Mathewson Webster, MD ChB FRCS(Ed), Director, West Midland Forensic Science Laboratory, Birmingham, Home Office.
- George Wood, Chairman, Thos. W. Ward Ltd., Sheffield.
- William Rogers Fanner, OBE MC, British subject resident in Egypt.
- Frederick Hampton, Counsellor (Labour) at His Majesty's Embassy in Athens.
- William James Moffatt, Director-General, Iraqi State Railways.
- David Travers Morgan, Chairman, British Chamber of Commerce, Buenos Aires.
- John Percival Summerscale, lately Counsellor (Commercial) at His Majesty's Embassy in Warsaw.
- Kenneth James Macarthur White, His Majesty's Consul-General at Gothenburg.
- Lewis Ronald East, MICE, Chairman of the State Rivers and Water Supply Commission, State of Victoria.
- Vivien Frederic Ellenberger, ISO, lately Deputy Resident Commissioner and Government Secretary, Bechuanaland Protectorate.
- Fergus Munro Innes, CIE. For services to the United Kingdom community in Pakistan.
- Arthur Geoffrey Strickland, MAgSc, Chief Horticulturist, Department of Agriculture, State of South Australia.
- Sydney Hadyn Veats. For services to journalism in Southern Rhodesia.
- Alfred Francis Adderley. For public services in Bahamas.
- The Right Reverend Hugh Van Lynden Otter-Barry, the Bishop of Mauritius.
- Simon Bloomberg, lately Collector General of Customs, Jamaica.
- Archibald Campbell, MIMechE MILocoE, Chief Mechanical Engineer, Office of the Crown Agents for the Colonies.
- Herbert Jeffery Collins, lately Sub-Regional Security Officer, Hong Kong.
- Eustace Henry Taylor-Cummings, MBE MD ChB MRCS LRCP. For services to the Municipality of Freetown, Sierra Leone.
- Charles Layard Edwards. For public services in Singapore.
- Hedley Humphrey Facer, MBE. For public services in the Federation of Malaya.
- The Reverend Canon Robert Mortimer Gibbons, OBE, Principal of St. Andrew's College, Minaki, Tanganyika.
- Lee Tiang Keng, MB ChB. Member for Health, Federation of Malaya.
- Arthur Hubert Stanley Megaw, Director of Antiquities, Cyprus.
- Robert Karl Nunes. For public services in Jamaica.
- Andrew Hamilton Young, Director of Marketing and Exports, Nigeria.

Honorary Commanders

- Tunku Ismail bin Tunku Yahaya, State Secretary, Kedah and Acting Mentri Besar, Kedah, Federation of Malaya.
- The Reverend Okon Efiong, OBE (Hon.). For public services in Nigeria.
- Gaius Ikuobase Obaseki. For public service in Nigeria.

==== Officer of the Order of the British Empire (OBE) ====
Military Division

Royal Navy

- Commander (E) James William Cable, MBE.
- Mr. George Arthur Calvert, Chief Engineer Officer, Royal Fleet Auxiliary Service.
- Commander (S) Arthur Alan Chappell, VRD, Royal Naval Volunteer Reserve.
- Acting Interim Surgeon Commander William Macfarlane Davidson, MB BCh.
- Lieutenant-Colonel Robert James Freeman, Royal Marines Forces Volunteer Reserve.
- Commander (S) Henry Reginald Harold.
- Surgeon Commander (D) William Holgate, LDS.
- Commander (S) James Wallace Maulden.
- Instructor Commander Albert Harvey Miles.
- Commander Michael Donston Capel Meyrick, DSO.
- Commander Bradwell Talbot Turner, DSO.
- The Reverend Douglas James Noel Wanstall, MA, Chaplain.
- Commander Harry Ernest Huston Nicholls, DSC, Senior Officer, Malayan Naval Force.
- Commander John Michael Dudgeon Gray, Royal Navy.

Army

- Lieutenant-Colonel George Biddulph Aris, MC TD (52253), Royal Regiment of Artillery, Territorial Army.
- Major (local Lieutenant-Colonel Staff Paymaster 1st Class) Frederick James Bairsto (27274), Royal Army Pay Corps.
- Lieutenant-Colonel James Maurice Alexander Chestnutt (39149), Royal Regiment of Artillery.
- Lieutenant-Colonel Edmund Herbert Collins (19922), The Sherwood Foresters (Nottinghamshire and Derbyshire Regiment).
- Lieutenant-Colonel (temporary) Angie Henry Davies, AMIMechE (111072), Corps of Royal Electrical & Mechanical Engineers.
- Lieutenant-Colonel George Tancred Denaro, DSO (27507), The York & Lancaster Regiment.
- Lieutenant-Colonel (temporary) Paul Herbert Devas Dessain, MC (41101), The Green Howards (Alexandra, Princess of Wales's Own Yorkshire Regiment).
- Lieutenant-Colonel Richard Charles Dyke (40373), Royal Regiment of Artillery.
- Lieutenant-Colonel (temporary) Geoffrey Arthur Ross Fawcus, BA (40377), Corps of Royal Engineers.
- Lieutenant-Colonel (temporary) Thomas Haddon (58141), The Border Regiment.
- Lieutenant-Colonel John Michael Hanmer, DSO (39635), The Durham Light Infantry.
- Lieutenant-Colonel (temporary) Ralph Hargreaves (113843), Corps of Royal Engineers.
- Lieutenant-Colonel Richard Peele Holmes, MBE TD (45052), Royal Regiment of Artillery, Territorial Army.
- Lieutenant-Colonel Hugh Fitzgerald Hutchinson (34462), Employed List (late Royal Regiment of Artillery).
- Lieutenant-Colonel (acting) Yvone Eustace Sutton Kirkpatrick (38581), Combined Cadet Force.
- Lieutenant-Colonel Derek George Levis, MB (70125), Royal Army Medical Corps.
- Lieutenant-Colonel Richard Frederick Luck (37262), 1st King's Dragoon Guards, Royal Armoured Corps.
- Lieutenant-Colonel Angus John MacIver, MB (100996), Royal Army Medical Corps, Territorial Army.
- Lieutenant-Colonel (temporary) Anthony Martyn (44138), The Queen's Own Royal West Kent Regiment.
- Lieutenant-Colonel Alexander Douglas McKechnie, DSO TD (41986), Honourable Artillery Company (Infantry), Territorial Army.
- Lieutenant-Colonel (Quartermaster) Hector John Finlay Munro (78666), Corps of Royal Engineers.
- Lieutenant-Colonel William Francis Bell Nott, TD (90161), Royal Corps of Signals, Territorial Army.
- Lieutenant-Colonel (temporary) William Odling, MC (44143), Royal Regiment of Artillery.
- Lieutenant-Colonel (temporary) Ricardo Reginald Owens (141085), Army Catering Corps.
- Lieutenant-Colonel (acting) Albert Edward Shepherd (275201), Army Cadet Force.
- Lieutenant-Colonel Charles Spence, TD (56911), The Royal Northumberland Fusiliers, Territorial Army.
- Lieutenant-Colonel Hugh Cowan Stenhouse, MBE (87830), Royal Army Service Corps, Territorial Army.
- Lieutenant-Colonel (temporary) James Charles Timmins (118951), Royal Army Ordnance Corps.
- Lieutenant-Colonel Eustace Thomas Turner, TD (19687), Royal Regiment of Artillery, Territorial Army.
- Lieutenant-Colonel (acting) Richard Peter Hugh Utley (47736), Combined Cadet Force.
- Lieutenant-Colonel (temporary) Rosemary Jennifer Wells (192993), Women's Royal Army Corps.
- Lieutenant-Colonel John William Channing Williams, DSO (41246), The Wiltshire Regiment (Duke of Edinburgh's).
- Lieutenant-Colonel (temporary) Laurence Harry Wood (45002), The Wiltshire Regiment (Duke of Edinburgh's).
- Lieutenant-Colonel (temporary) John Francis Worsley, MC (380190), The York & Lancaster Regiment.
- Lieutenant-Colonel Michael Lavallin Wroughton, TD (52462), Royal Regiment of Artillery, Territorial Army.

Royal Air Force

- Group Captain Albert Archibald Newbury.
- Wing Commander Keith Horace Gooding (31156).
- Wing Commander Francis Drake Luke, BEM (45564).
- Wing Commander Charles Baldwin Millett (73820).
- Wing Commander Cecil Dunn Milne, DFC (33273).
- Wing Commander Brenus Gwynne Morris (34167).
- Wing Commander Derek James Sherlock (11134).
- Wing Commander Robert Higson Smith (36161).
- Wing Commander Harold Stringer (36106).
- Wing Commander John Hodgson Woffindin, MBE (43561).
- Acting Wing Commander Freeman Marshall Osborn, DFC AFC (44734).
- Acting Wing Commander George Arthur Potter (44251).
- Squadron Leader Robert Walter Adams (47072).
- Squadron Leader Hilton Rex Hall, DFC (58787).
- Squadron Leader Arthur Sidney Harman (46600).
- Squadron Leader Kenneth Holden, DFC (90705), Royal Auxiliary Air Force.
- Squadron Leader Cyril Harry Leese (45452).
- Squadron Leader William Norrie (121190), Royal Air Force Volunteer Reserve.

Civil Division

- George Sidney Abbey, British Resident, Gelsenkirchen, Control Commission for Germany, British Element.
- Charles Penrhyn Ackers, JP. For services to discharged airmen of the Royal Air Force.
- Alderman Thomas Fred Adams, JP, lately Mayor of Torquay.
- John Forster Alcock, MIMechE, Chief Scientist, Ricardo & Co. (1927) Ltd., Shoreham-by-Sea.
- Robert Guy Alexander, Principal, War Office.
- The Right Honourable Dorothy, Viscountess Arbuthnott, Vice-chairman of the Council, Scottish Branch, British Red Cross Society.
- Charles Arthur James Argent, Director of Duplicating & Distribution, HM Stationery Office.
- Robert Atkinson, FRIBA, Architect. For services to the Admiralty.
- Stanley Robert Atwill, MBE, Vice Chairman, Southampton Local Savings Committee.
- Charles Vernon Bailey, Senior Finance Officer, Headquarters, National Coal Board.
- George Edward David Ball, Principal, Ministry of Labour & National Service.
- Edith Ellen Ann Bargman, Superintendent Health Visitor, Surrey County Council.
- Alec Nevison Barnes, Regional Finance Officer, South Western Region, Ministry of Labour & National Service.
- John James Stewart Barnhill, MICE. For services as Official Arbitrator under the Administrative Provisions Act (Northern Ireland), 1928.
- George Smith Barry, FRICS FRSanI, County Surveyor of Ayrshire.
- Edward Gordon Bell, Chief Executive Officer, Scottish Education Department.
- Thomas Birkett, National Secretary, Waterways & Fishing Section, Transport & General Workers Union.
- William Blood, MRCS LRCP, Chairman, Brook Green Disablement Advisory Committee.
- Alfred Henry James Bown, FCIS, General Manager and Clerk, River Wear Commissioners.
- Lieutenant-Colonel George Albert Brett, DSO MC, Secretary, Territorial & Auxiliary Forces Association of the County of Monmouth.
- Alfred Frederick Wilfred Brewer, Superintendent Registrar, Hackney.
- Walter Bridge, Regional House Coal Officer, North Western Region.
- William Brown, JP, Chairman, Dumfriesshire Education Committee.
- William Harrison Buchanan, General Manager, R. & H. Green & Silley Weir Ltd., Royal Albert Dock, London.
- William George Burrell, Headmaster, HM Dockyard School, Portsmouth.
- John Walker Burt, Higher Collector, London North, Board of Customs & Excise.
- Elizabeth Casson, MD ChB, Founder and Medical Director of the Dorset House School of Occupational Therapy Ltd., Churchill Hospital, Oxford.
- Frank Carlos Catchpole, Deputy Regional Controller, North Midlands Region, Ministry of Labour & National Service.
- Frederic Robert Catty, Foreign Office.
- Edward George Chadder, Senior Superintendent Engineer, Sound, British Broadcasting Corporation.
- Henry James Childs, Head of Branch, Ministry of National Insurance.
- George Geoffrey Clark, Director of Planning, Devon County Council.
- Alderman Lilian Mary Hart Clark, JP, Cambridgeshire County Council.
- Herbert Clarke, Assistant Regional Director, South Region, Ministry of Works.
- James William Clarke, Chief Inspector, Wages Boards and Councils, Ministry of Labour & National Service.
- Harry Cleaver, JP, Chairman, Nuneaton Savings Committee.
- Lionel Cleaver, AMICE, Harbour Engineer, Docks & Canals Division, Ministry of Transport.
- Harry Archibald Cochran, MIMinE, Manager, Minerals Division, Colonial Development Corporation.
- Alderman Jack Cohen, JP. For political and public services in Sunderland.
- Charles Frederick Cooke, Principal Inspector, Board of Customs & Excise.
- Leonard Cooke, JP, Director of the Co-operative Wholesale Society Ltd.
- William Cotter, Member of the General Council, National Federation of Building Trades Operatives.
- Councillor Walter Robert Cowen, MRSanI, Managing Director, Walter Cowen Ltd.
- William James Cozens, AMICE, Superintending Civil Engineer (Grade II), Air Ministry.
- Douglas Ernest Crickmay, MBE, Actuary, Hull Savings Bank.
- Robert Stephenson Cripps, General Manager and Secretary, Londonderry Harbour Commissioners.
- Group Captain John Cunningham, DSO DFC DL, Chief Test Pilot, De Havilland Aircraft Co. Ltd.
- Councillor Minnie Cutler, JP. For political and public services in Southampton.
- Charles Edward Daniels, MIMarE, Principal Officer, Marine Survey, West of Scotland District, Ministry of Transport.
- William Davies, AMIMinE, Superintending Civil Engineer, Ministry of Works.
- Adelina De Lara, Pianist.
- Cyril Thomas Demarne, Chief Officer, West Ham Fire Brigade.
- Barbara Mary Denis De Vitre, Assistant Inspector of Constabulary, Home Office.
- Robert Leonard Dixon, MBE, Senior Executive Officer, Commonwealth Relations Office.
- George Edwards, Deputy Director, Oils & Fats Division, Ministry of Food.
- William Rowley Elliston, TD. For public services in Suffolk.
- Captain Jack Donald Fletcher Elvish, Principal Marine Superintendent, Clan Line Steamers Ltd.
- Lucy Gratia Fildes, PhD, Senior Psychologist, London Child Guidance Training Centre.
- Gladys Vera Findlay, Honorary Secretary, Kent County Branch of the Forces Help Society & Lord Roberts Workshops.
- Alderman William Henry Freestone. For political and public services in Leicester.
- Ronald Frith, PhD, Principal Scientific Officer, Air Ministry.
- Alfred Samuel Fromow, Past President of the Horticultural Trades Association.
- Percy Henry Fruin, Chief Examiner, Board of Inland Revenue.
- Harry Garratt, Principal, Chance Technical College, Smethwick, Staffordshire.
- Sidney Harold Gibb, Chief Executive Officer, General Post Office.
- Isobel Scott Gibson, Principal, Glasgow & West of Scotland College of Domestic Science.
- Phillip Henry Goffey, Principal Patents & Awards Officer, Ministry of Supply.
- Alderman John Frederic Goode. For political and public services in Worcestershire.
- Alderman Isa Graham, JP, Chairman, East Cumberland War Pensions Committee.
- John Lauder Graham, Principal, Department of Health for Scotland.
- Colonel William Thornton Huband Gregg, DSO, County Commandant, Ulster Special Constabulary.
- Albert Griffin, Waterguard Superintendent, Cardiff, Board of Customs & Excise.
- Edward Charles Clifford Hamblin, Principal Regional Officer, Leeds, Ministry of Local Government & Planning.
- Alderman Joseph William Hammond, Chairman, County Planning Committee, Pembrokeshire.
- Herbert Edward Hancocke, MIMarE AMIMechE AFRAeS, Assistant Director, Directorate-General of Aircraft Supplies, Ministry of Supply.
- William James Handy, Deputy Director of Contracts, Ministry of Supply.
- William Harding, MIMarE, Lately, Chief Engineer Officer, RMS Queen Elizabeth, Cunard Steamship Co. Ltd.
- Councillor Miss Kathleen Agnes Mabel Harper, JP, Mayor of Bath.
- Cecil Stanley Harrison, Attorney-General of Jersey.
- Alderman George Douglas Hastwell, JP. For political and public services in Barrow-in-Furness.
- Helen Kathleen Hawkins, MA, Principal, Derby Diocesan Training College.
- William David Hay, Director, Experimental Husbandry Farm, Ministry of Agriculture & Fisheries.
- Lieutenant-Colonel Ronald Hazell, MBE TD, Lately Ministry of Transport Representative in Poland.
- Robert Stanley Heesom, General Secretary, British Sailors Society.
- Captain John Claudius Herdman, DL. For public services in County Tyrone, Northern Ireland.
- Edith Hesling Bradbury, Deputy Chairman, Rubber Manufacturing (Great Britain) Wages Council.
- Leonard Sutton Higgins, MA, Headmaster, Porthcawl Secondary Modern School, Glamorganshire.
- Patrick Henry Michael Hoey, lately Chairman, Board of Inland Revenue Departmental Whitley Council (Staff Side).
- Ronald Herbert Acland Holbech. For public services in Warwickshire.
- Harold Rollings, DSc FRIC, Controller of Research, North Thames Gas Board.
- Alderman Richard Thomas Holness. For political and public services in Ilford.
- Fred Howarth, Secretary of the Football League.
- Sidney Ralph Howes, Director and General Manager, Samuel Fox & Co. Ltd., Sheffield.
- Bramwell Hudson, JP. For public services in Stroud, Gloucestershire.
- Patrick Lawrence Hughes, Regional Controller, North Western Region, Ministry of Local Government & Planning.
- Thomas John Hunt, Principal Information Officer, Central Office of Information.
- John Frederick Hunter, ARCA, Senior Inspector, Ministry of Education, Northern Ireland.
- Alderman Nellie Hyde, JP, Chairman of the Enforcement Sub-Committee of the Birmingham Food Control Committee.
- Robert John Jackson, Chairman, Local Price Regulation Committee, Northern Ireland.
- William Jackson, JP, Member, Ministry of Agriculture's Advisory Committee on Sheep, Northern Ireland.
- Edward Brynmor Jenkins, Secretary, Newcastle Regional Hospital Board.
- William Blackwood Johnstone, Director, Alexander Stephen & Sons Ltd., Glasgow.
- Harry Jones, Principal, Central Land Board & War Damage Commission.
- William Jordan, Principal Inspector of Taxes, Board of Inland Revenue.
- Eleanor Mary Knowles, FDS RCS LDS, Deputy Senior Dental Officer, Ministry of Health.
- William Douglas Lambie, United Kingdom Trade Commissioner (Grade II) for Newfoundland & Maritime Provinces, Canada.
- Eric John Lawman, Chief Executive Officer, Ministry of National Insurance.
- Sydney Lawrence, MBE, Chief Constable, Kingston-upon-Hull.
- Alderman Charles Edward Leatherland, JP. For political and public services in Essex.
- Captain Walter Harold Leech, DSC, Submarine Superintendent, Engineer-in-Chief's Office, General Post Office.
- Major Norman Allen Lewis, DSO MC, lately Secretary of the Boys' Brigade for London.
- William Lewis. For political and public services in Glamorganshire.
- Leonard Thomas Leybourne, DCM, Deputy Regional Controller, Eastern Region, National Assistance Board.
- James Livingstone, Deputy Director, Personnel Department, British Council.
- David Llewellyn, JP, Chairman, Bournemouth Wing Committee, Air Training Corps.
- William Lockhart, AMIMechE, Commodore Chief Engineer and Chief Engineer Officer, SS Edinburgh Castle, Union Castle Mail Steamship Co. Ltd.
- Miriam Lord. For services to the Margaret McMillan Memorial Fund in Bradford.
- Hugh Ralph Lupton, MC MICE MIMechE, lately Mechanical Engineer, Metropolitan Water Board.
- Albert George Lyon, MBE, lately Civil Assistant to the Deputy Chief of Naval Personnel, Admiralty.
- Robert Andrew McElderry, JP. For services to the savings movement in Ballymoney, County Antrim.
- Alan Douglas McEwen, DSc MRCVS, Senior Principal Scientific Officer, Animal Diseases Research Association.
- Thomas Mack, Deputy Principal Executive Officer, War Office.
- William Maclean, Chief Constable, Ross & Cromarty Constabulary.
- George Percy Male, MRCVS, Veterinary Surgeon, Reading.
- William Marsh, Assistant to the Accountant, Railway Executive (Southern Region).
- Arthur Morel Massee, DSc, Senior Principal Scientific Officer, East Mailing Agricultural Research Station.
- Alfred Edward Matthews, Actor.
- Harold John Newton Mattock, Assistant Director of Contracts, Air Ministry.
- Colin Alfred Meek, MSc, Principal Scientific Officer, Ministry of Supply.
- George Henry Meir, JP. For political services in North Staffordshire.
- Harry Orlando Missenden, General Manager, Birmingham British Industries Fair.
- Graham Russell Mitchell, Civil Assistant, War Office (later deputy director general MI5.
- Edward Mockett, AMIEE, Staff Manager, Cable & Wireless Ltd.
- Horace Moutrie Montford, Principal, Foreign Office, German Section.
- Major Bruce Samuel Kirkman Giuse-Moores, MC, Governor, Class I, HM Prison Wakefield.
- George Muir, MC, Head Postmaster, Dundee.
- Rodney Margaret Murray, JP, lately Lady Provost of Edinburgh.
- John Percy Truelove Musson, MB ChB, Deputy Director-General of Medical Services, Ministry of Pensions.
- Alfred Nash, Director, Cabot Carbon Ltd.
- Leonard Charles Nash, Principal, Ministry of Civil Aviation.
- Harry Noble, Senior Principal Scientific Officer, Admiralty Signal & Radar Establishment, Haslemere.
- Edward Duncan Nuttall, MBE, Chairman, Ipswich Local Employment Committee.
- Terence Herriot O'Brien, JP, Member of the Cumberland & Westmorland District Committee, Northern Regional Board for Industry.
- Councillor Miss May O'Conor, Chairman, Isle of Wight Youth Employment Committee.
- Thomas Henry O'Donoghue, lately Editor of Official Report of Debates, House of Commons.
- Dorothy Constance Sackville Owen, Honorary County Secretary, Pembrokeshire, Sailors', Soldiers' & Airmen's Families' Association.
- David Watt Page, MBE, Deputy Accountant-General, Ministry of Pensions.
- Frederick Richard Parnell. For services in the improvement of the cotton plant.
- George William Pearson. For services to the film industry.
- Arthur Harry Perkins, County Treasurer, Bedford County Council.
- Frederick Victor Pipe, AMIEE, Chairman, Derby District Committee, North Midlands Regional Board for Industry.
- Hugh Robert McIntyre Pollard, lately Senior Scottish Officer, Ministry of Fuel & Power.
- William Benjamin Rawlings, MC, Deputy Commander, Metropolitan Police.
- Ernest William Densham Ray, HM Inspector of Schools, Ministry of Education.
- Alderman Frederick Charles Reeves, MM. For political and public services in Dorset.
- James Arthur Robson, Principal Officer, Ministry of Agriculture, Northern Ireland.
- Alfred Joseph Rogers, lately Official Receiver, Board of Trade.
- Dorrell Kaye Rollit, General Secretary, Institution of British Launderers Ltd.
- Captain Richard Rudd, Senior Captain, 2nd Class, British Overseas Airways Corporation.
- William John Saddler. For political and public services in Monmouthshire.
- Victor Salter, Advertising Manager, Belfast Telegraph.
- Charles Schofield, JP, General Secretary, Amalgamated Association of Operative Cotton Spinners & Twiners.
- William Coxon Scott, MBE, Grade I(A) Officer, Branch B of the Foreign Service, Foreign Office.
- Philip Joseph Sellier, MICE, Regional Opencast Director, Ministry of Fuel & Power.
- Herbert Farrar Shaw, Chairman, Dewsbury Local Employment Committee, West Riding of Yorkshire.
- Squadron-Leader William Simpson, DFC, Member, National Advisory Council on the Employment of the Disabled.
- Gerard Hamilton Smith, JP, Chairman, Derby & Derbyshire Post Office Advisory Committee.
- Major William Henry Stephenson, JP, lately Army Welfare Officer, Southport. Member, West Lancashire Territorial & Auxiliary Forces Association.
- Albert Stevenson, JP, Chairman, Lisburn Urban District Council, County Antrim, Northern Ireland.
- Harry George Stride, MBE, Chief Clerk, Royal Mint.
- Albert Berina Sturgess, Chief Executive Officer, Ministry of Transport.
- Fairbank Howard Sutcliffe, Honorary Secretary and Treasurer to the Governors, Queen Mary's Hospital, Roehampton.
- James Frederick Tamblyn, MC, Principal, Ministry of Food.
- Cyril William Taylor, lately Head of the Siam Rice Unit.
- Sydney Taylor, Chairman, Lowestoft Local Tribunal, Ministry of National Insurance.
- Mark Hartland Thomas, FRIBA, Chief Industrial Officer, Council of Industrial Design.
- Alexander Thomson, Secretary, Scottish Savings Committee.
- Alfred Alexander Thorpe, JP, Chairman, Cardiff Savings Committee.
- Herman Guy Collingwood Townsend, Senior Assistant Controller, Timber Control, Board of Trade.
- George Leonard Turney, Assistant Director, Directorate of Scientific Intelligence, Ministry of Defence.
- Florence Nellie Udell, MBE, Chief Nursing Officer, Colonial Office.
- John Armston Vice, AMIEE, Generation Operation Engineer, Headquarters, British Electricity Authority.
- John William Tudor Walsh, DSC MIEE, Senior Principal Scientific Officer, Department of Scientific & Industrial Research.
- Kenneth Southwold Weston, Principal, HM Treasury.
- George Thomas William Whitehead, MIMechE, Assistant General Manager (Works), Johnson & Phillips Ltd., London.
- Henry Whittaker, FSA, Chairman, Blackburn Savings Committee.
- Lieutenant-Colonel Albert Frederick Wilcox, Chief Constable, Hertfordshire.
- George Thomas Wilkes, MC, First Class Valuer, Board of Inland Revenue.
- Francis Wilkins, Investment Adviser, Royal Air Force Benevolent Fund.
- John Withers Wilkinson, MIMechE, lately Chief of Armament Design, Vickers-Armstrongs Ltd., Barrow.
- Albert Henry Willcocks, British Resident, Verden-Rotenburg, Control Commission for Germany, British Element.
- Hugh Brown Wilson, MBE, Scottish Representative on the Sea Cadet Council.
- Joseph William Wilson, MRCVS, Divisional Veterinary Inspector, Ministry of Agriculture & Fisheries.
- Roderick George Young, Assistant Regional Controller, North Midland Region, Ministry of National Insurance.
- Victor Leslie Young, MBE, General Manager, Ministry of Supply No. 2 Agency Factory, Westwood.
- William Norman Doley, British subject resident in Belgium.
- Reginald Henderson Eckford, MBE, Acting British Consul-General at Tsingtao.
- Ronald Ward Fay, Senior Executive Officer, Information Office, British Embassy, Cairo.
- Christopher Leonard Patrick Gilshenan, Director, Legal Division, Allied Commission for Austria (British Element).
- William Robinson Innes, First Secretary (Economic), Office of the Commissioner-General for His Majesty's Government in the United Kingdom in South-East Asia.
- William Beauchamps de la Maziere Jamieson, Deputy Director of Education, Sudan Government.
- Peter Northcote Lunn, Second Secretary and Head of Visa Section at His Majesty's Legation in Berne.
- Captain James Humphrey Cotton Minchin, His Majesty's Consul at Kansas City.
- Arthur John Montague, British Council Representative in the Argentine Republic.
- Lieutenant-Colonel Richard Riseley Proud, First Secretary at His Majesty's Embassy at Kathmandu.
- Richard Llewellyn Rees, British subject resident in Turkey.
- Andrew John Ronalds, His Majesty's Consul at Beira, formerly Consul at Venice.
- Gwenffrwd Mostyn Herbert-Smith, First Secretary (Commercial) at His Majesty's Embassy in Paris.
- Charles Thomas Underhill, Customs Adviser to the Government of Ethiopia.
- Commander Frederick Vivian Vaughan, VRD, Royal Naval Volunteer Reserve (Ret'd.), Honorary Assistant Naval Attaché at His Majesty's Embassy, Santiago.
- Percy Reginald Williamson, First Secretary (Labour) at His Majesty's Embassy in Stockholm.
- Eric Ormond Baker, JP. For public and social welfare services in the State of Victoria.
- David Douglas Brown, lately Chief Tobacco Officer, Southern Rhodesia.
- Councillor William Austin Comeadow, JP, of Kew City, State of Victoria.
- John Doyle, lately Commissioner of Police, State of Western Australia.
- The Right Honourable Victoria May, Baroness Dulverton. For services rendered under the auspices of the Victoria League in connection with hospitality to visitors from overseas.
- Herbert John Drummond Elliot, District Officer, Basutoland.
- The Right Honourable Mary Gertrude, Baroness Emmott. For services rendered in connection with hospitality to visitors from overseas.
- Bertram Howard Johnson, Chief Engineer, Rhodesia Railways.
- Gertrude Emily Johnson, of the State of Victoria, Honorary Director of the National Theatre Movement.
- Thomas William Jones, JP, a Member of the European Advisory Council, Bechuanaland Protectorate.
- Milford Cormack Lee. For social welfare services, especially to ex-servicemen, in the State of South Australia.
- Angus Robertson Macgillivray, Chairman, Calcutta Import Trade Association.
- Francisca Adriana Paquita, Lady Mawson. For social welfare services in the State of South Australia.
- Canon Augustus James Moore, Anglican Missionary, Basutoland.
- Roy Francis Mullins, Honorary Secretary, Royal Hobart Regatta Committee, State of Tasmania.
- Anton Eric Romyn, MC, Secretary for Agriculture and Lands, Southern Rhodesia.
- James Anderson, DSc PhD MRCVS, Colonial Veterinary Service, Assistant Director (Veterinary Research), Kenya.
- Arthur Joseph Boase, MRCS LRCP, Colonial Medical Service, Ophthalmologist, Uganda.
- John Edwin Piercy Booth, Colonial Agricultural Service, Agricultural Officer, Kenya.
- George Joseph Bridges. For services as Manager of the British Phosphate Commission, Ocean Island, Western Pacific.
- John Bathurst Brown, Accountant General, Northern Rhodesia.
- Cecil Frederick Charter, Chief Soil Scientist, Department of Agriculture, Gold Coast.
- Salako Ambrosius Benka-Coker, Crown Counsel, Sierra Leone.
- Norman Cook. For public services in Northern Rhodesia.
- William Gerald Groves Cooper, ARCS FGS, Director of Geological Surveys, Nyasaland.
- Hugh Copley, Fish Warden, Kenya.
- Hubert Nathaniel Critchlow, General Secretary, British Guiana Labour Union, British Guiana.
- Frederick Eutrope Degazon, LLB, Commissioner for Reconstruction, St. Lucia, Windward Islands.
- John Matthew Drennan, DCM, Head of Department, Class B, Office of the Crown Agents for the Colonies.
- Major Sarel Eloff du Toit, MC. For public services in Tanganyika.
- Richard Freeman, Government Printer, Nigeria.
- Louis Galea, LLD, Attorney-General, Malta.
- Oswald Vernon Garratt, Colonial Prisons Service, Commissioner of Prisons, Federation of Malaya.
- Charles Gray Gosling Gilbert, Colonial Education Service, Director of Education, Bermuda.
- John Douglas Claude Goddard. For services to sport, Barbados.
- Ralph Francis Alnwick Grey, Colonial Administrative Service, Administrative Officer, Class II, Nigeria.
- Edward Harvey Griffiths, lately Chief Manager of Colonial Sugar Refining Co., Fiji.
- Geoffrey Campbell Gunter. For public services in Jamaica.
- The Reverend Canon Donald Rowland Knowles. For services in the Diocese of Nassau in the Bahamas.
- Nene [[Azzu Mate Kole II]], Konor of Manya Krobo, Gold Coast.
- Gerald Beverley McLean Liddelow, Colonial Police Service, Assistant Commissioner of Police, Trinidad.
- James Leslie McLetchie, MB ChB, Colonial Medical Service, Senior Medical Officer i/c Sleeping Sickness Service, Nigeria.
- George Marangos, Honorary Consulting Surgeon at Limassol Hospital, Cyprus.
- Gage Hall Hewett O'Dwyer. For public services in Nigeria.
- Roy Edgardo Parry, lately Director of Education, North Borneo.
- Lena Frances Gordon Priestman, MB BS MRCS LRCP, Medical Officer, Molai Leper Colony, Nigeria.
- Joeli Kete Ravai, Roko Tui Tailevu, Fiji.
- Michael Robert Raymer, Colonial Administrative Service, Colonial Secretary, Falkland Islands.
- Frederick George Ritchie. For public services in Singapore.
- John Trevor Roper Curzon Rodger, Colonial Administrative Service, District Officer, Tanganyika.
- Vincent Roth. For public services in British Guiana.
- William Simpson, Colonial Education Service, Principal, Education Department, Nigeria.
- Edward Francis Small. For public services in the Gambia.
- Philip Robert Stephenson, Colonial Agricultural Service, Director, Desert Locust Survey, East Africa High Commission.
- William Ngartse Thomas Tam, LLB. For public services in Hong Kong.
- Norman Turner, Principal Accountant, Accountant General's Department, Nigeria.
- Henry Douglas Weatherhead, MRCS LRCP, lately Director of Medical Services, North Borneo.
- Eric Howard Wilson, ED, lately Principal of the Raffles Institution, Education Department, Singapore.

Honorary Officers

- Pengiran Anak Haji Muhammad Yasin ibni Pengiran Tua Omar Ali, Duli Pengiran Bendahara (First Minister), Brunei.
- The Reverend Moses Odutola Dada, Chairman of Methodist Church, Western Nigeria District, Nigeria.
- Louis Philip Ojukwu. For public services in Nigeria.

==== Member of the Order of the British Empire (MBE) ====
Military Division

Royal Navy

- Captain (Quartermaster) Cecil Henry Barnett, Royal Marines.
- Lieutenant (S) Herbert Gibson Bradshaw.
- Lieutenant-Commander Anthony Vivian Miles Diamond.
- Temporary Acting Lieutenant-Commander (SP) William Henry Ferguson, Royal Naval Volunteer Reserve.
- Mr. William Henry Gill, Temporary Senior Commissioned Air Engineer (Ordnance).
- Lieutenant-Commander Harold Arthur Judkins, DSC.
- Lieutenant (E) William Richard George Knott, DSC.
- Mr. William John Humphrey May, Temporary Acting Senior Commissioned Wardmaster.
- Acting Lieutenant-Commander (A) George McCracken Rutherford, DSC, Royal Naval Volunteer Reserve.
- Mr. David Jenkin Wadey, Temporary Acting Senior Commissioned Electrical Officer (L).
- Communication Lieutenant Edwin John Webber.
- Lieutenant (E) Stanley Charles Wiltshire, DSC, (Ret'd.).

Army

- No.S/57271 Warrant Officer Class II Raleigh Berold Adams, Royal Army Service Corps.
- Major Frederick Ernest Anfield (85837), Corps of Royal Electrical & Mechanical Engineers.
- No.36642 Warrant Officer Class I Joseph Aslett, Corps of Royal Electrical & Mechanical Engineers.
- Captain Gerald William Banton (178270), Royal Regiment of Artillery, Territorial Army.
- Major Richard Beggs (233768), Royal Regiment of Artillery.
- No.S/57366 Warrant Officer Class I (acting) Colin Blair, Royal Army Service Corps.
- Major (Quartermaster) George Harper Brooks (153820), Royal Regiment of Artillery.
- Major (temporary) Stanley Alfred Buckmaster (175206), Royal Army Ordnance Corps.
- Captain Albert Daffurn Chilton (112846), The Royal Leicestershire Regiment.
- Captain Mary Maude Church (213678), Queen Alexandra's Royal Army Nursing Corps.
- No.2611143 Warrant Officer Class I (acting) Harold Ernest Clarke, Grenadier Guards.
- No.1518247 Warrant Officer Class I Arthur William Coleman, Royal Regiment of Artillery.
- Lieutenant Arthur Stanley Davis (188097), Combined Cadet Force.
- No.2200163 Warrant Officer Class II Kenneth Jack de Torre, Corps of Royal Engineers, Territorial Army.
- No.1870150 Warrant Officer Class II Leonard Royland Dollery, Corps of Royal Engineers.
- No.5381553 Warrant Officer Class, I Frank William Franklin, The Oxfordshire & Buckinghamshire Light Infantry.
- Major Thomas Gibson (104999), Royal Corps of Signals, Territorial Army.
- Major Frederick Vernon Stuart Gray (70653), Royal Army Service Corps.
- Major (temporary) William Bryce Greenfield (347591), Army Cadet Force.
- Captain Charles Henry Gurney (195432), Royal Regiment of Artillery.
- Major (Staff Paymaster, 2nd Class (temporary)) Frederick James Harman (211085), Royal Army Pay Corps.
- Major (temporary) Christopher Edwin Head (147000), Corps of Royal Engineers (seconded to Extra Regimentally Employed List).
- No.1423064 Warrant Officer Class II Robert Malcolm Henderson, Royal Regiment of Artillery, Territorial Army.
- Major Anthony George Hewitt, MC (64629), The Middlesex Regiment (Duke of Cambridge's Own).
- Major (temporary) Richard Charles Hughes, TD (63747), The Cheshire Regiment.
- Major Richard Swinton Hunt (70112), Royal Army Medical Corps.
- Major Wallace Henry Irish (96758), Royal Regiment of Artillery, Territorial Army.
- No.22279047 Warrant Officer Class I Gordon Jacobs, Royal Regiment of Artillery.
- No.3306337 Warrant Officer Class I Charles William Johnstone, The Royal Scots (The Royal Regiment).
- No.T/1662607 Warrant Officer Class I Ernest Everett Jones, Royal Army Service Corps.
- Major Henry Robert Jordan, TD (76357), Royal Corps of Signals.
- No.2718979 Warrant Officer Class II James Joseph Kelly, Irish Guards.
- Major (temporary) Jack Kennard (202480), Corps of Royal Electrical & Mechanical Engineers.
- No.T/2613236 Warrant Officer Class I William Henry Kibble, Royal Army Service Corps.
- No.W/29531 Warrant Officer Class II Sydney Mary Learmouth, Women's Royal Army Corps.
- Major Ralph Stanley Loveridge, MC (182191), The Duke of Cornwall's Light Infantry.
- Major Douglas Guy Hastings Mackie (62527), Royal Regiment of Artillery.
- Major Raymond Harold Meaker (175394), Royal Armoured Corps.
- Major (temporary) Clifford Clarence Norbury, MC (165802), The Essex Regiment.
- Lieutenant Leonard Stanley North (347754), Army Cadet Force.
- No.1863911 Warrant Officer Class I Henry James Pavey, Corps of Royal Engineers.
- Major Thomas Carruthers Payne, BSc(Eng) ACGI AMIMechE AMIEE (79236), Corps of Royal Electrical & Mechanical Engineers.
- Major John Ashton Pounder, TD (79403), Royal Regiment of Artillery, Territorial Army.
- No.1140732 Warrant Officer Class I (acting) Richard James George Price, Royal Army Educational Corps.
- Major (temporary) William Price (125697), Royal Army Medical Corps.
- Major (temporary) Henry Edward Victor Caleb Pryor (275921), Army Cadet Force.
- Major Stephen Murfin Rose (67108), The Royal Fusiliers (City of London Regiment).
- Major (acting) Frederick James Routledge (216401), General List, Territorial Army.
- Captain Arthur Lionel Ruler (270924), Corps of Royal Engineers.
- Major Frederick Herbert Margetson Rushmore (69748), Royal Regiment of Artillery.
- Major (Quartermaster) Percy Henry Segon (117014), The Royal Lincolnshire Regiment.
- No.S/57772 Warrant Officer Class II David Alan Smith, Royal Army Service Corps.
- Captain John Hood Smith (176471), The Argyll & Sutherland Highlanders (Princess Louise's).
- Major (temporary) Peter Bernard Stephenson (99741), The King's Regiment (Liverpool).
- No.7582350 Warrant Officer Class I Charles Samuel Richard Sullivan, Corps of Royal Electrical & Mechanical Engineers.
- Major (Quartermaster) Tom Middleton Sutton (191565), Royal Horse Artillery.
- Major (temporary) Sidney Frederick Thompson (375744), Corps of Royal Engineers.
- No.S/215792 Warrant Officer Class I Charlie Tomison, Royal Army Service Corps.
- Major (Quartermaster) Albert Vernon Toy, TD (89334), The Devonshire Regiment, Territorial Army.
- Major (temporary) Arthur John Turner, MC (126335), Corps of Royal Engineers.
- Major Frank Raymond Walker (293591), The South Staffordshire Regiment, Territorial Army.
- Major Frederick William Watson (152028), Corps of Royal Engineers.
- No.4909985 Warrant Officer Class I Clifford Gordon Williams, Royal Regiment of Artillery.
- No.1868480 Warrant Officer Class I Albert John Williamson, Corps of Royal Engineers.
- Major George David Young (50231), Royal Army Veterinary Corps.

Royal Air Force

- Acting Wing Commander Arnison Stanley Dodd (62146), Royal Air Force Volunteer Reserve.
- Acting Wing Commander Denis Graham Smallwood, DSO DFC (40645).
- Squadron Leader Robert Fernie (46241).
- Acting Squadron Leader Robert John Mitchell, AMIEE (46700).
- Acting Squadron Leader George Watson Spiers (78266).
- Acting Squadron Leader Jeremiah Joseph Tynan (43736).
- Acting Squadron Leader Joseph Alfred West (65739), Royal Air Force Volunteer Reserve.
- Flight Lieutenant Harold Berry (57750).
- Flight Lieutenant Ian Birkett Clark (135411).
- Flight Lieutenant Arthur Kenneth Edwards (56011).
- Flight Lieutenant Kazimierz Gierzod, AMIEE (500357).
- Flight Lieutenant William Hannant (52817).
- Flight Lieutenant Clarence Leslie George Puncher (49911).
- Flight Lieutenant Peter Smith (181101).
- Flight Lieutenant John Henry Smyth (144608).
- Flight Lieutenant John Edward Tompkins (48262).
- Flight Lieutenant Walter Edward Wiseman, DFC (56710).
- Flying Officer Charles Galpin Lilley (164705).
- Warrant Officer William Biggins (514975).
- Warrant Officer Harold Dyche (352428).
- Warrant Officer Francis George Ferris (518433).
- Warrant Officer George Hicks (507946).
- Warrant Officer Henry George William Howell (560293).
- Warrant Officer Percy James Ingram (516085).
- Warrant Officer Ivor John Leek (529215).
- Warrant Officer Alfred Meller (354963).
- Warrant Officer Cecil Herbert Oldridge Pearce (365930).
- Warrant Officer Arthur Phillips Rees (520826).
- Warrant Officer Lewis Stuart Way (590257).
- Warrant Officer Edward Young (510906).
- Acting Warrant Officer Leslie Harold Withers (1607094).

Civil Division

- Hilda Charlotte Adams, Higher Executive Officer, Ministry of Civil Aviation.
- William Allen, Assistant Commissioner, St. John Ambulance Brigade, Belfast Division, Northern Ireland.
- George Alley, Assistant Production Engineer, Air Ministry, Cardington.
- George Stewart Burns Anderson, Manager, Maryhill Employment Exchange, Ministry of Labour & National Service.
- Thomas Hedley Anderson, Organiser for the Tyneside Area, National Union of General and Municipal Workers.
- James Hozier Archibald, Senior Executive Officer, Ministry of Food.
- Winifred Leah Armstrong, Children's Officer, Ministry of Pensions.
- Elizabeth Mary Hunter-Arundell, County Secretary, Dumfriesshire, Women's Voluntary Services.
- Raymond Howard Austin, AMICE, Divisional Engineer, Western Division, City Engineer's Department, City of Westminster.
- Frank George Axmann, Establishment Officer, County Courts Branch, Lord Chancellor's Department.
- Edward Lockyer Baddeley, Senior Executive Officer, Ministry of Civil Aviation.
- John Baillie, Member, Berwickshire Savings Committee.
- Ernest Baines, Senior Assistant District Auditor, Ministry of Local Government & Planning.
- Bernard Barber, Superintendent of Capenhurst Grange Remand Home, Wirral, Cheshire.
- David Murray Barclay, Manager, Mountstuart Dry Dock Ltd., Avonmouth.
- Ernest Barker, Chief Foreman, Boiler Department, Locomotive Works, Gorton, Railway Executive.
- Russell Charles Samuel Barnett, JP, lately Chairman, Beckenham & Penge Local Employment Committee.
- Charles Basham, President, Newport (Monmouthshire) Horticultural Society.
- Frederick David Baxter, Collector of Taxes (Higher Grade), Board of Inland Revenue.
- William Beaton, Member, Aberdeen Local Employment Committee.
- John Bebb, JP, Member, Montgomeryshire Agricultural Executive Committee.
- Commander Ernest Wright Beetham, Royal Navy (Ret'd.), Secretary, Royal Navy Football Association.
- Jennie Martin Benn, Executive Officer, Home Office.
- Henry Arthur Bennett, Chief Clerk, United Kingdom Embassy, in the Republic of Ireland.
- Joseph Henry Bennetts. For political and public services in Cornwall.
- George Edward Bevens, Senior Executive Officer, Ministry of Pensions.
- Harold Charles Birch, Chief Executive Officer, National Savings Committee.
- Ernest Frederick Bishop, Executive Officer, Cabinet Office.
- Herbert Robinson Blyth, Passenger Trade Group Secretary, Transport & General Workers' Union (Region No. 8).
- Charles Frederick Bolton, AMIEE, Divisional Transmission Engineer, South Eastern Division, British Electricity Authority.
- Doris Elizabeth Bonell, Chief Superintendent of Typists, Metropolitan Police Office.
- George Sim Bonnyman. For services to the Scottish Clans Association of London.
- Eleanor Milford Booker, Information Officer, Commonwealth Relations Office.
- Clement Ernest Borrie, Secretary, Cashier, Store Officer and Librarian, Royal Naval College, Greenwich.
- Elizabeth Ann Brace, Headmistress, Queen Mary's Hospital School, Carshalton, Surrey.
- Albert John Brely, Grade 3 Officer, Ministry of Labour & National Service.
- Abram Broadfoot, County Agricultural Adviser for West Perth, West of Scotland Agricultural College.
- Margaret Merry Brotherston, MB ChB(Ed), Organising Secretary and Honorary Treasurer, Voluntary Health Workers Association, Edinburgh.
- Dorothy Helen Brown, Higher Executive Officer, Ministry of Transport.
- George William Brown, Higher Executive Officer, Foreign Office.
- Maurice Butter, Chairman of Committee, No. 398 (Staines) Squadron, Air Training Corps.
- Leslie John Cannon, Supervisor, South East England Wholesale Meat Supply Association.
- John Spencer Carr, Commercial Manager, EMI Factories Ltd., Hayes, Middlesex.
- Phyllis Winifred Cassidy, Senior Assistant, Board of Trade.
- Frank Stevenson Cathro, Secretary, Association of Jute Spinners & Manufacturers.
- John William Chadwick, Honorary Secretary, Halifax Savings Committee.
- Joseph Challinor, Secretary, North Regional Association for the Blind.
- Frederick William Clifton, JP, General Secretary, London Transport (Central Tram & Trolleybus) Sports Association, London Transport Executive.
- Leonard Cluett, Deputy Director of Bacon Imports, Ministry of Food.
- James Tooke Coe, JP, Organiser for Norfolk, National Union of Agricultural Workers.
- Isaiah George Trevor Cokayne, Foreign Office.
- Ruby Victoria Colley, Higher Executive Officer, Foreign Office, German Section.
- Louisa Mary Collinson, Higher Executive Officer, Scottish Education Department.
- Henry Charles Coote, Higher Executive Officer, Board of Trade.
- Janet McCulloch Coupland, Provost of the Royal Burgh of Wigtown.
- Henry James Cousley, JP, District Commandant, Ulster Special Constabulary.
- Edward James Cox, AMIMechE, lately Chief Draughtsman, Admiralty.
- James Norman Stewart Craig, Higher Executive Officer, Ministry of Transport.
- Cyril Leslie Crocker, Higher Clerical Officer, Admiralty.
- John Cullen. For public services in County Durham.
- John James Cullion, Vice-Chairman, Lanarkshire District Committee of the Scottish Board for Industry.
- Herbert Duncan Cumming, MC, Chairman of Committee, No. 95F (Crewe) Squadron, Air Training Corps.
- Reginald Joseph Currey, Control Officer, Grade I, Kiel, Control Commission for Germany, British Element.
- Phoebe Ellen Cusden, JP. For political and public services in Reading.
- Alexander William Cussans, Adjutant, Ulster Special Constabulary.
- Francis William Daniels, Head of Tractor Sales Department, Ford Motor Co. Ltd.
- Albert Davenport, General Works Manager, Salford Electrical Instruments, Ltd, Heywood.
- William Alexander Davey, Farmer, West Sussex. For services to agriculture.
- Margaret Beatrice Davies, Private Secretary to the Librarian, National Library of Wales, Aberystwyth.
- William George Davies. For political and public services in Lewisham.
- Edgar James Dawes, Senior Executive Officer, Ministry of Fuel & Power.
- Francis Moorhouse Dean, ARIBA, Senior Architect, Ministry of Works.
- Mabel Matilda Deed, JP. For public services in Kent.
- Charles Brand Dickins, Head of Purchasing Department, Richard Johnson & Nephew Ltd., Manchester.
- John Thomas Burke Donnellan, Senior Draughtsman, Post Office, Birmingham.
- Alfred George Freeman Dorling, Senior Executive Officer, Ministry of National Insurance.
- Alderman Margaret Douglas. For political and public services in Dartford.
- Henry Trestrail Dyer, Surveyor, Southampton, Board of Customs & Excise.
- Frederick John Dykes, Mechanical Engineer, Grimethorpe, Ferrymore & Brierley Collieries, North Eastern Division, National Coal Board.
- Gertrude Mary Eadie, Chairman, Paisley Joint Committee for Day Nurseries.
- Bernard Louis Ecob, Deputy Chief Constable, Leicester.
- David Edward Edwards, Engineer and Surveyor to Wrexham Rural District Council.
- John Edwards, Chairman, Ellesmere Rural Parish Council.
- Andrew James Ellis, Senior Staff Officer, Board of Customs & Excise.
- Thomas Hubert Endersby, Chief Executive Officer, Ministry of Supply.
- William John English, Vice-Chairman, Somerset District Committee of South Western Regional Board for Industry.
- James Bryce Esslemont, Honorary Secretary, Aberdeen City Savings Committee.
- Alderman William Evans, JP. For political and public services in Swansea.
- Iris Elizabeth Evered, County Borough Organiser, Bournemouth, Women's Voluntary Services.
- Matthew Feaks, Woods Manager, Moray Estates Development Co. Ltd.
- Henry Alexander Fells, PhD FRIC, Industrial Fuel Consultant.
- Clifford Pratt Fenner, Chief Accountant, Essex Territorial & Auxiliary Forces Association.
- Cyril Ernest Flitton, Vice-Chairman, Loughborough Local Employment Committee.
- Dorothy Fox, Welfare Officer, Ministry of Health.
- George Philip Fox, Representative of the British Broadcasting Corporation in Leeds.
- Cyril Comerford Francis, Furnishings Buyer, Navy, Army and Air Force Institutes.
- Arthur Charles Franklin, MIMechE, Chief Engineer, Worthington-Simpson Ltd., Newark, Nottinghamshire.
- Frederick Gardiner, MC JP, Commandant, No. 4 Group (Oxford), Royal Observer Corps.
- John Edgar Gerard, Regional Chief Clerk of Works, Ministry of Works.
- Rose Gibson, JP, Headmistress, Whinney Banks Junior Mixed School, Middlesbrough, North Riding of Yorkshire.
- Phyllis Mary Gidman, County Borough Organiser, Nottingham, Women's Voluntary Service.
- Arthur Gill, General Secretary, National Society of Street Masons, Paviors and Road Makers.
- John Stewart Gillies, Assistant Engineer, Manager, William Doxford & Sons Ltd., Sunderland.
- Edith Kate Golledge, Member, Yeovil Local Employment Committee.
- William John Gower, Senior Executive Officer, Department of Scientific & Industrial Research.
- William Graham, Personnel Manager, Darlington & Simpson Rolling Mills Ltd., Darlington.
- William Henry Graham, Hostel Warden, National Assistance Board.
- Major Elsie Green, Salvation Army, with the British Forces of Occupation in Germany.
- Harry Green, Works Services Planning Officer, Headquarters, Western Command, War Office.
- Thomas Joseph Green, Higher Executive Officer, Ministry of Works.
- Alexander James Greenslade, Chief Officer, Bootle Fire Brigade, Lancashire.
- Una Rosina Laura Greenwood, Headmistress, Globe Road Junior Mixed & Infants School, Bethnal Green.
- Dorothy Adelaide Gresham, Typist, Ministry of Fuel and Power.
- Fanny Grimes, Supervisor, London Ambulance Service.
- Dorothy Jane Gunn, Headmistress, Old Hale Way Secondary Modern Girls School, Hitchin, Hertfordshire.
- Walter Frederick Hall, Vice-Chairman, Derby Savings Committee.
- Ruth Hand, Headmistress, Fawfieldhead Newton Church of England School, Staffordshire.
- Selina May Harding, District Nurse, Singleton, West Sussex.
- Frances Eileen Hardy, Secretary, Northern Ireland Council of Social Service.
- Thomas William Harkes, Feedingstuffs Officer, Lancashire Agricultural Executive Committee.
- Joseph Edward Harland, Chief Engineer Officer, SS Rowanbank, Andrew Weir Shipping & Trading Co. Ltd.
- Frederick John Harlow, Rehabilitation Officer, Sheffield, Ministry of Labour & National Service.
- Tom Evelyn Harris, Police Staff Officer, Control Commission for Germany, British Element.
- Freda Harrison, Assistant Secretary, Bureau of Hygiene & Tropical Diseases.
- Mabel Ellen Henderson, BEM, County Organiser, West Sussex, Women's Voluntary Services.
- Sarah Jane Dill Henderson, Junior Staff Officer, Ministry of Finance, Northern Ireland.
- Ruth Hendry, Welfare Officer, Yardley & Co. Ltd.
- Frederick Charles Henry, General Secretary, Waterproof Garment Workers' Trade Union.
- Joseph Edward Herbert, Chief Press Officer, Ministry of Labour & National Service.
- Alfred Percival Hickey, Deputy Superintendent, Admiralty Gunnery Equipment Depot, Coventry.
- Claude Charles Hidden, Senior Executive Officer, Ministry of Education.
- Una Gertrude Ada Hobson, Controller of Typists, Ministry of National Insurance.
- Elsie Kathleen Hoddinott, Ward Sister, Feilding Palmer Hospital, Lutterworth, near Rugby.
- Walter Hogarth, JP, Director, North Western Federation of Building Trades Employers.
- Charles William Hooton, Chairman of Committee, No. 204 (Lincoln) Squadron, Air Training Corps.
- Henry Samuel Bennett Hore, Chairman, Torquay Savings Committee.
- James Milne Howie, lately Area Livestock Supervisor, Aberdeen, Ministry of Food.
- Tom Howse, lately Higher Clerical Officer, British Museum.
- William Arthur Hoy, Experimental Officer, National Institute for Research in Dairying.
- William Spencer Hudson, AMIMechE. For services as Regional Fuel Engineer, Ministry of Fuel & Power.
- Ethel Hilda Hughes, PhD, County Organiser, South Middlesex Women's Voluntary Services.
- Reginald Lord Heyworth Hulme, Head Postmaster, Lancaster.
- George Maclaren Humphreys, AFRAeS, Senior Experimental Officer, Aeroplane & Armament Experimental Establishment, Ministry of Supply, Boscombe Down.
- Annie Ironside, Poultry Advisory Officer, Grade II, Ministry of Agriculture & Fisheries.
- Margaret Emily Irwin, Matron, Miners' Rehabilitation Centre, Talygarn, South Western Division, National Coal Board.
- Kathleen Margaret Jackson, Staff Officer, Ministry, of Health & Local Government, Northern Ireland.
- Vera Bronwen May James, Senior Nursing Sister, Ministry of Supply Factory, Windscale, Cumberland.
- Sidney George Jemmett, Assistant for Special Duties to the Restaurant Car Superintendent, Hotels Executive, British Transport Commission.
- Nelson Jerram, Engineer Superintendent, British Overseas Airways Corporation.
- George Williams John, Headmaster, Camrose South Primary School, Pembrokeshire.
- George Frederick Albert Johnson, Chief Clerk, "Q" Branch, Headquarters, British Troops in Egypt.
- John Thornburn Johnson, Senior Divisional Planning Officer, Lancashire County Council.
- Thomas Francis Johnson, Senior Executive Officer, Prison Commission.
- George Bishop Jones, FRIC AMICE JP, Chairman, Huddersfield & Halifax District Committee of the East and West Ridings Regional Board for Industry.
- Walter Crawford Jones, Manager, Tottenham Employment Exchange, Ministry of Labour & National Service.
- Captain Alfred Wallace Kay, lately Master, SS Granta, Witherington & Everett.
- John Keir, Superintendent and Deputy Chief Constable, Stirling & Clackmannan Police Force.
- David Keirs, Colliery Manager, Whitburn Colliery, Durham Division, National Coal Board.
- Alfred Daniel Kerr, Chief Draughtsman, Drysdale & Co. Ltd., Glasgow.
- Florence May Turner Kidd, Superintendent of Typists, Ministry of Health.
- Lucille Kime, Member of the Corset Advisory Panel, Board of Trade.
- Major Edward Thomas King, MM TD, Senior Assistant Land Commissioner, Ministry of Agriculture & Fisheries.
- Mary Elizabeth Kirkby, District Nurse, West Suffolk.
- John Charles Kirkpatrick, Chief Welfare Officer, English Electric Co. Ltd., Liverpool.
- Alfred Joseph Knight, VC, Senior Wages Inspector, Ministry of Labour & National Service.
- John Henry Lamb, Surveyor and Manager, George Armitage & Sons Ltd., Wakefield.
- Charles John William Legry, Intelligence Officer, Grade I, Control Commission for Germany, British Element.
- Ralph Montague Leman, Senior Radiographer, Royal Victoria Hospital, Belfast, Northern Ireland.
- Alderman Ernest Thomas Lenderyou, Vice Chairman, Dartford Local Employment Committee.
- Francis Meredith Lewis, Senior Executive Officer, National Debt Office.
- Joseph Lomax, Works Manager, United Glass Bottle Manufacturers Ltd., St. Helens.
- Lieutenant-Colonel Robert George McCall, Deputy Regional Food Officer, South-Eastern Region, Ministry of Food.
- Mary Hossack McCartney, Honorary Secretary, City of Londonderry & District Horticultural Society.
- Norman McInnes, Inspector of Works (Mechanical & Electrical), RAF Henlow.
- Ernest Osman McIntosh, Drawing Superintendent, Survey Production Centre, War Office.
- Captain John McKinlay, Master, SS Ahshun, China Navigation Co. Ltd.
- Alexander Alfred Lambert MacManus, a District Manager, Export Credits Guarantee Department.
- Jessie McNally, Secretary, National Association of Creamery Proprietors & Wholesale Dairymen, Incorporated.
- Henry Charles Mansfield, Inspector of Taxes (Higher Grade), Board of Inland Revenue.
- Arthur Marsden, PhD MSc FRIC, Area Scientist, South Western Gas Board.
- Councillor John Marshall, JP, Tees-side District Delegate, Amalgamated Society of Woodworkers.
- Lily Constance Marx, lately Vice Chairman, Executive Council of the Institute of Almoners.
- Sydney Morton Mason, AMICE, Chief Town Planning Assistant, Bradford.
- Harold Meldrum, lately Area Bread Officer, North Midland Region.
- Michael John Melvin. For services to ex-Service men in Scotland.
- William Christopher Meredith, Foundry Manager, Hadfields Ltd., Sheffield.
- Lilian Blanche Victoria Merritt, Clerical Officer, General Post Office.
- Marguerita Evangeline Merrylees, General Secretary, National Federation of Housing Societies.
- John Richard Milborrow, Senior Executive Officer, Ministry of Fuel & Power.
- Percival Stanley Millington, Member, Paisley Appeal Tribunal, National Assistance Board.
- Mildred Dora Millman, Matron, St. John Ophthalmic Hospital, Jerusalem.
- Frank Mitchell, Flight Radio Officer, British Overseas Airways Corporation.
- Robert William Moger, JP, Chairman of Committee, No. 282 (East Ham) Squadron, Air Training Corps.
- Elizabeth Margaret Monie, Head Instructress in Dairying, Somerset County Council.
- Robert Main Moore, Town Clerk of Bangor, County Down, Northern Ireland.
- Thomas Moore, Superintendent, Nottinghamshire Constabulary.
- Cecelia Morris, Matron, Bodeys Park Hospital for Mental Defectives, Chertsey.
- Cedric George Morris, HM Inspector, Immigration Branch, Home Office.
- Arthur Frederick Moss, District Operating Superintendent, Glasgow, Railway Executive.
- Captain John McColl Murray, Commander, Fishery Cruiser Vigilant, Scottish Fishery Protection Service.
- Florence Needs, Director, James Davies (Longton) Ltd.
- Alexander Neill, MA, Headmaster, Niddrie Marischal Junior Secondary School, Edinburgh.
- Henry William Newall, Chief Executive Officer, Board of Trade.
- Herbert Newman, South Wales & Bristol District Secretary of the National Union of Enginemen, Firemen, Mechanics & Electrical Workers.
- Arthur Coates Newton, Foreign Office.
- Eric Newton, ARAeS, Chief Investigating Officer, Accidents Investigation Branch, Ministry of Civil Aviation.
- Ernest Hilton Niblett, Technical & Works Director, Wright & Weaire Ltd., South Shields.
- William Stanley Nicholls, Senior Executive Officer, Colonial Office.
- John Rowlands Nicholson, Fishery Officer, Lancashire & Western Sea Fisheries Committee.
- Mary Askey Nixon, Matron, Robson Maternity Home, Stockton-on-Tees.
- Gwynedd Hallam Nutter, Head of Accounts Section, Royal Society.
- William O'Neill, JP, Vice-Chairman, Dundee Local Employment Committee.
- William Onions, JP, Councillor, Manchester City Council.
- Gertrude Orton, Chairman, Cannock & District Youth Employment Committee.
- Archibald Wright Howard Osborne, Senior Information Officer, Central Office of Information.
- Arthur Charles Owen, MC, lately Manager, Cornwall Sub-Area, South Western Electricity Board.
- John Oldnall Page, Grade II Officer, National Agricultural Advisory Service, Ministry of Agriculture & Fisheries.
- Stanley Herbert Parker, Supervising Clerk, Headquarters, Southern Command, War Office.
- Reginald Parkes, Managing Director, Whites-Nunan Ltd., Manchester.
- George Frederick William Patterson, Chief Metallurgist, Murex Ltd., Rainham, Essex.
- Trevor Gordon Pearce, Works Manager, C. H. Bailey Ltd., Newport, Monmouthshire.
- Frederick Pearkes, Chief Sales Superintendent, East Telephone Area, London, General Post Office.
- Rosina Maude Pearson, Member of the Board of Trade Committee on Weights & Measures Legislation.
- James Peggie, General Manager, Leith Provident Co-operative Society.
- Joseph Ernest Peirson, Group Manager, Bermondsey Group, South Eastern Division, Road Haulage Executive.
- Ernest Perry, Severn District Engineer, South Western Waterways Division, Docks & Inland Waterways Executive.
- Captain James Laurence Peterson, Dockmaster, Barry, Docks & Inland Waterways Executive.
- John Pickard, Foreign Office.
- Alfred Ernest Pickering, Chief Engineer, Design and Drawing Office, Parsons Marine Steam Turbine Co. Ltd.
- Joseph Marie Pisharello, Engineer Clerk, Grade I, War Department, Gibraltar.
- Thomas Platt. For political and public services in Cheshire.
- John Powdrill, General Manager and Engineer, Pontypool, Wales Gas Board.
- Timothy Lawrence Price. For services to education in Larne, County Antrim, Northern Ireland.
- John Surtees Pringle, Deputy Admiralty Regional Officer, North Western Region.
- John Robert Procter, lately Honorary Secretary of the Association of Superintendents of School Attendance Departments.
- William Prothero, Deputy Chief Constable, Carmarthenshire.
- Charles George Purkis, Labour Officer, Harland & Wolff, North Woolwich.
- Charles James Quinton, Senior Auditor, Exchequer & Audit Department.
- Alice Margareta Read, lately County Borough Organiser, Leeds, Women's Voluntary Services.
- Edward John Cecil Reed, AMICE, Senior Resident Engineer, Civil Engineer's Department, Railway Executive (Southern Region).
- Minne Rees. For public services in Carmarthenshire.
- Paul Lennox Rex, Senior Executive Officer, Passport Control Department, Foreign Office.
- Robert Osmond Reynolds, Sea Transport Stores Officer, Southampton, Ministry of Transport.
- Noel Melville Richards, Head of Photographic & Reproductions Branch, Air Ministry.
- George Riding, Senior Administration Officer, Ministry of Supply, Tropical Testing Establishment, Port Harcourt, Nigeria.
- James Riding, Superintendent, Hinwick Hall School for Crippled Boys, Wellingborough.
- Matthew Ridley, Regional Collector of Taxes, Board of Inland Revenue.
- William Howard Ritch, Chief Radio Officer, SS Mahronda, Thos. & Jno. Blocklebank Ltd.
- Telfar Ritchie, Commercial Manager, Barclay Curle & Co. Ltd.
- Arthur Ernest Roberts, Senior Executive Officer, Ministry of Transport.
- Herbert Edward Romain. For services to the Bacon Importers National (Defence) Association Ltd.
- Margaret May Rowe, lately Deputy to the Head of the Old People's Welfare Department, Women's Voluntary Services.
- Alexander McDonald Bower Rule, MA, Principal, City of Birmingham Commercial College.
- Arthur Edward William Rumbold, Deputy Director of Accounts, HM Stationery Office.
- William Henry Scott, Honorary Secretary, Birmingham Savings Committee.
- John Barren Sheehan, Senior Executive Officer, Ministry of Transport.
- George Ledger Shephard, Higher Executive Officer, Ministry of National Insurance.
- John Reginald Shipley, Senior Executive Officer, Board of Trade.
- Arthur Edward Singleton, Farmer, Oxton, Nottinghamshire. For services to agriculture.
- Edith Maria Smee, Founder Member of the Women's Section, British Legion, and Chairman, Metropolitan Area.
- Frederick Humphrey-Smith, Honorary Secretary, Burgess Hill Savings Committee.
- Thomas Haddow Smith, General Secretary, National League of the Blind.
- Walter Rawson Snell, Production Manager, Main Diesel Works, Ruston & Hornsby Ltd., Lincoln.
- Dorothy Elizabeth Soper, ARIBA, Senior Assessor in charge, Coventry Technical Centre, Central Land Board and War Damage Commission.
- John Southern, lately Colliery Manager, Wingfield Manor Colliery, East Midlands Division, National Coal Board.
- Captain John Spencer, DSO MM, Clerk, Shardlow Rural District Council, Derbyshire.
- Montague Henry Spicer, Principal Clerk, Taxing Office, Supreme Court of Judicature.
- Eric Pemble Stevens, Works Manager, Martin-Baker Aircraft Co. Ltd., Higher Denham.
- Donald Henry Stevenson, JP, Honorary Secretary, County Armagh Savings Committee.
- George Harry Stevenson, Chairman, Market Harborough District Committee, Leicester Agricultural Executive Committee.
- John Stevenson, Chairman, Scottish Association of Young Farmers Clubs.
- Lilian Ann Stroud, Controller of Typists, Board of Inland Revenue.
- Charles Rowell Stuart, Senior Executive Officer, Ministry of Local Government and Planning.
- Captain William John Swan, Lay Administrator, Ministry of Pensions Polish Convalescent Home, Chudleigh, Devon.
- John Swanson, Assistant Firemaster, Glasgow Fire Brigade.
- Catherine Ellen Swettenham, County Commissioner for Armagh, Ulster Girl Guides.
- Harry Augustus Syms, Higher Executive Officer, Admiralty.
- John Tatlock, Senior Draughtsman, Atomic Energy Establishment, Ministry of Supply, Risley.
- Sidney Charles Taylor, Clerical Officer, Ministry of Transport.
- Alfred William Thompson, Divisional Officer, Middlesex Fire Brigade.
- Anstace Mary Austin-Thompson, Church Army Voluntary Worker with the British Army of the Rhine.
- Frederick Arnold Thompson, Assistant Postmaster, Redhill, Surrey.
- Ernest Thornton. For political and public services in Rochdale.
- Frederick Henry Thornton, FCA. Lately Chairman of Wallasey, Cheshire, Food Control Committee.
- Janet Willock Thornton, Higher Executive Officer, Ministry of National Insurance.
- Austin Leonard Thorogood, Principal Scientific Officer, Department of Scientific and Industrial Research.
- Arthur Joseph Thorp, Chief Superintendent, Metropolitan Police.
- Thomas Tinning, Station Master, Glasgow Central, Railway Executive (Scottish Region).
- Leonie Dora Trouteaud, Representative of the Red Cross on the Guernsey Council of the Order of St. John of Jerusalem.
- James Gabriel Tucker, South West District Organiser, National Union of General and Municipal Workers.
- Harold William Turner, Senior Executive Officer, Ministry of Supply.
- Nora May Turner, Higher Executive Officer, Board of Trade.
- Thomas Albert Turner, Records Officer, North West European District, Imperial War Graves Commission.
- Olive Ingleton Turney, Honorary Secretary, Wainford Savings Committee, Suffolk.
- Harry Tweedale, ACA. Lately Divisional Accountant, North Western Division, British Electricity Authority.
- Councillor Samuel Usher, JP. For public services in County Durham.
- Arthur David Wadey, Control Officer, Grade I, Hanover, Control Commission for Germany, British Element.
- Thomas Wainwright, Inspector of Taxes (Higher Grade), Board of Inland Revenue.
- Norman William Wakelam, Deputy Manager, West Bromwich Local Office, Ministry of National Insurance.
- Reginald Charles Walker, Accounts Officer, Imperial War Graves Commission.
- William Fulton Walker, Chairman, Argyll, Renfrew & Bute War Pensions Committee.
- Gertrude Walley, Honorary Officer in charge of Stepney Savings Centre.
- Robert James Watson, Inspector of Taxes (Higher Grade), Board of Inland Revenue.
- Alfred George Way, Manager, Film Coating Department, Ilford Ltd.
- Charles Gordon Weatherley, Senior Office Clerk, House of Commons.
- Stanley Cecil Wells, Traffic Manager, East Yorkshire Motor Services.
- John White, Lands Officer, Department of Agriculture for Scotland.
- Alderman Mary Whitmore. For political and public services in Ipswich.
- Harry Wilcox, Senior Executive Officer, Air Ministry.
- Alfred Llywelyn Williams, Higher Executive Officer, Ministry of National Insurance.
- Thomas Williams, Senior Chief Clerk, Board of Customs and Excise.
- Walton Allen Williams, Works Manager, Perry Chain Co. Ltd., Abercrave, South Wales.
- Margaret Emily Wilmot, Sister, West London Hospital.
- Amelia Evangeline Wilson, lately Matron, Lisburn Hospital, County Antrim.
- Frederick Percival Wootton, Superintendent of Boot and Shoe Instruction, Northamptonshire Local Education Authority.
- Frank Wright. For services in the production of worsted and other yarns.
- James Wright, Chief Superintendent, Staffordshire Constabulary.
- Percy Wright, Director, A. G. Jones & Co. Ltd., Derby.
- Archibald Wylie, Sales and Service Manager, East Midlands Gas Board.
- Ralph Richmond Yerburgh, MICE, Regional Production Engineer, North Midland Region, Ministry of Fuel and Power.
- Frank Bede Young, Clerk to the Preston Rural District Council.
- Elizabeth Jean Yule, Matron, Ross Memorial Hospital, Dingwall.
- Dimitri Balascheff, Interpreter, Allied Commission for Austria (British Element).
- John Moodie Clague, Archivist at the United Kingdom Liaison Mission in Japan.
- Gerald Geoffrey Vincent Coleman, British Vice-Consul at Tela.
- Rene Bernard Diacono, District Commissioner, British Administration, Tripolitania.
- Phyllis Mary Dickens, Principal Matron, Ministry of Health, Sudan Government.
- Margaret Isobel Dunlop, Acting Passport Control Officer and British Vice-Consul at Tangier.
- Margaret Mary Eccles, Headmistress, British School, Madrid.
- Isobel Mary Easie Elkington, British subject resident in Egypt.
- Beatrice Winifred Flynn, Personal Assistant to His Majesty's Ambassador in Moscow.
- Frederick George Green, Deputy Commissioner of Police, British Administration, Eritrea.
- Edward Hawthorn, British subject resident in France.
- John Houlden, British subject resident in the Argentine Republic.
- Monica Mabel Jennings, lately Cypher Officer at His Majesty's Legation in Budapest.
- Francis Paul List, Honorary British Consul at Luxembourg.
- James McKay, Inspector, Sudan Veterinary Service.
- Onko Jalmar Tjardo Nyegaard Domela-Nieuwenhuis, British subject resident in the Netherlands.
- Ronald George Peele, Assistant Information Officer, British Administration, Eritrea.
- Margaret Jane Robbie, British subject resident in the Sudan.
- Olive Saywell, Headmistress, Kindergarten School, Bagdad.
- Stuart Elliot Sword, British Pro-Consul at Antofagasta.
- Thomas John Vivian Usher, Assistant Archivist at His Majesty's Embassy at Copenhagen.
- Charles Verity Waite, Establishment Officer, Public Works Department, Sudan Government.
- Frederick Herbert Watts, Second Secretary and Administration Officer at His Majesty's Embassy at Rangoon.
- James Thomas Weir, His Majesty Consul at Havana.
- Phoebe Faull Anderson, of Horsham, State of Victoria. For social welfare services.
- Rose Elizabeth Baker, Matron of the Echuca District Hospital, State of Victoria.
- John Horwood Bastick, lately Secretary for Public Works, State of Tasmania.
- Muriel Eliza Bridgland. For services in connection with the Soldiers' Home League, State of South Australia.
- Ella Cleggett, Secretary of the Tubercular Soldiers' Aid Society, State of South Australia.
- Phillip Abraham Cremer, lately Principal of the Johannesrust School, Melsetter, Southern Rhodesia.
- Margaret Phyllis Dry, Nursing Sister and Midwife at Waddilove Mission, Southern Rhodesia.
- Gertrude Annie Fraser, of Launceston, State of Tasmania. For social welfare services.
- Rufus Frederick Green. For social welfare services on behalf of the Coloured community in Southern Rhodesia.
- Minnie Ethel Hines. For social welfare services in the State of South Australia.
- Alexander James Jenkins. For municipal services in Mildura, State of Victoria.
- Lawson William Lane, Deputy Chief Transportation Officer, Rhodesia Railways.
- Margaret Keddie Latta, Principal of the Nazarene Secondary School, Bremersdorp, Swaziland.
- Bruce Sidney Leahy. For services in connection with patriotic and charitable organisations in the State of Victoria.
- Harold Joseph Barrington Martin, Secretary of the Karachi Chamber of Commerce, Pakistan.
- Gladys Emily Mills, Matron in the Nursing Service, Southern Rhodesia.
- Griffith Monaheng, Adviser to the Paramount Chief, Basutoland.
- Rhoda Coker Musson, lately Officer-in-charge of Records, Income Tax Department, Southern Rhodesia.
- Gerald Austin William Piesse, of Wagin, State of Western Australia. For public services.
- Kathleen Mary Poile, Social Organiser, Royal Empire Society.
- Mervyn Noel Courtney St. Quintin, lately Private Secretary to the Prime Minister of Southern Rhodesia.
- Helen Cicely Radcliff, Senior Physiotherapist, Wingfield House, Royal Hobart Hospital, State of Tasmania.
- Alfred Sandover. For public services in the State of Western Australia.
- The Honourable Mary Harriet Hepburne-Scott, DD, Principal of the Institution for the Blind, Kalimpong, India.
- Vincent de Paul Siebert, Chief President of the Society of St. Vincent de Paul, State of South Australia.
- Chief Inspector Kenneth McRae Smith, British South Africa Police Reserve.
- Muriel, Lady Taylor. For services in connection with the Victoria League's scheme for the linking of schoolchildren throughout the Commonwealth.
- Maurice Emanuel Zeffert. For voluntary services, especially to ex-servicemen and their dependants, in the State of Western Australia.
- Charles William Adamson, Senior Works Supervisor, Public Works Department, Nyasaland.
- Asbollah bin Haji Arsat, Deputy Assistant District Officer, Kota Belud, North Borneo.
- Samuel Lauchland Athill, ISO. For public services in Antigua, Leeward Islands.
- Francis Nettleton Balme. For services as Manager, Barotseland Witwatersrand Native Labour Association Ltd., Northern Rhodesia.
- Graburn Stanley Barrack, Chief Accountant, Western Pacific High Commission.
- Lancelot Alexander Barton, Senior Executive Officer, Class I, Treasury Revenue Branch, Hong Kong.
- Arthur Beatty, Workshops and Timber Seasoning Manager, Public Works Department, Kenya.
- Margaret Annie Bell, Meteorological Assistant, East African Meteorological Service.
- Walter Randolph Bertrand, Acting Assistant Superintendent of Public Works, Grenada, Windward Islands.
- Edna Bishop. For welfare services in Barbados.
- Joseph Mifsud Bonnici, Assistant Treasurer, Malta.
- Henry Bromley. For services as Officer-in-Charge of Curieuse Leper Settlement in the Seychelles.
- Lilian Burwash, Queen Elizabeth's Colonial Nursing Service, Matron, Nigeria.
- Frederick George Caldwell, Accountant, Accountant-General's Department, Uganda.
- Kenneth Stephen Collins, Colonial Audit Service, Principal Auditor, Gambia.
- Myra Isabelle Cresson. For social services in Singapore.
- Emmanuel Ebenezer Dadzie. For public services in the Gold Coast.
- Augusta Elvira Darmanie. For voluntary welfare services in Trinidad.
- Mehmed Nazif Denizer. For public services in Cyprus.
- Theophilus Modjabeng Dowuona, Academic Registrar of the University College, Gold Coast.
- Gregor Andrew Duruty, Supervisor, Class I, Customs and Excise Department, Trinidad.
- Harry Wright Fraser, lately Assistant Social Welfare Worker, Hong Kong.
- George Furlong. For services to Railway Department, Mauritius.
- Winifred Gladys Gibbons. For welfare services in Bermuda.
- Olga Giraldi, Administrative Assistant, Education Department, Gibraltar.
- Persis Greig, Superintending Shorthand Typist, Office of the Comptroller for Development and Welfare, West Indies.
- Francis Vere Dewhurst Griffith. For meteorological services in Antigua, Leeward Islands.
- Sybil Harrison, Queen Elizabeth's Colonial Nursing Service, Health Sister, Klang, Federation of Malaya.
- John Hetherington, Chief Pharmacist, Medical Department, Uganda.
- The Reverend George Oughton Walder Hicks, Presbyterian Minister, Cayman Islands, Jamaica.
- John George Hooper, Superintendent of Sanitary Services, Hong Kong.
- Captain Robert Ingham. For services in connection with the Malta Memorial District Nursing Association, Malta.
- Ivan Denys Irvine, Colonial Administrative Service, Administrative Officer Class III, Federation of Malaya.
- Herbert Anglin Jones, Headmaster, Rollington Pen Elementary School, Jamaica.
- John Nicholas Abisodun Jones, Acting Accountant, Post Office, Sierra Leone.
- John Jenkyn Keigwin, Colonial Administrative Service, District Officer, Northern Rhodesia.
- Khoo Kim Lian. For public services in the Federation of Malaya.
- Narasimhaiyengar Krishnaswami, Office Superintendent, Posts and Telegraphs Department, British Somaliland.
- Charles Tristan Lagaite, Police Pay and Quarter Master, Mauritius.
- Arthur Charles Langlois, Deputy Director of Public Works, Bahamas.
- Francis Alfred Loyd, Colonial Administrative Service, District Commissioner, Fort Hall, Kenya.
- Irene Blanche Havergal MacDougall, Matron, Nakuru War Memorial Hospital, Kenya.
- James Hunter McGregor, Tobacco Officer, Tanganyika.
- Ian Vaudin Gordon Mackay, Colonial Audit Service, Senior Auditor, North Borneo.
- Alfred James Randall Master, Assistant Superintendent (Hotels and Catering), East African Railways and Harbours.
- James Nathaniel Meighan, District Commissioner, British Honduras.
- Olive Agnes Menezes. For voluntary social welfare services, Aden.
- Elizabeth Moody. For services to the Red Cross Society in Uganda.
- Manibhai Bhailalbhai Pandya, Senior Accounts Clerk, East African Customs and Excise Department.
- Peh Wah Kok, Clerk, Volunteer Forces Record Office, Singapore.
- Christodoulos Georghiou Pelaghias, lately Agricultural Superintendent, Department of Agriculture, Cyprus.
- Arthur Henry Bruce Robey, Senior Livestock Officer, Veterinary Department, Northern Rhodesia.
- Marjorie Sands. For voluntary social services in the Bahamas.
- Arthur Charles Herbert Sewell, Higher Executive Officer, Office of the Crown Agents for the Colonies.
- Sheik Mohammed Shakoor. For services to the Trade Union movement in British Guiana.
- Victor John Shearwin, Assistant Treasurer and Collector of Customs, British Solomon Islands Protectorate.
- Somnath Maganlal Shukla, Assistant Clerk of Councils, Tanganyika.
- George Richard Bertram Soltau, Colonial Administrative Service, Administrative Officer, Nyasaland.
- Jacomina Stoffberg, Missionary-in-Charge of the Nsadzu Leper Colony, Northern Rhodesia.
- Adele Evelina Johnson Tucker. For welfare services in Bermuda.
- Andrew Urquhart, Colonial Administrative Service, District Officer, Nigeria.
- Rarikua Stephen Vera, Livestock Officer, Veterinary Department, Fiji.
- Sydney Herbert Wilson. For public services in Fiji.
- Cecil George Wimbush. For services as Manager of the Union Jack Club, Singapore.

Honorary Members

- Dr. Abdul Latif bin Abdul Razak, LMS, Medical Officer, Federation of Malaya.
- Abdul Manan bin Haji Yacob, Colonisation Officer, Tanjung Karang, Federation of Malaya.
- Patrick Acholonu, Member of Orlu Divisional Native Authority, Nigeria.
- Omosanya Adefolu, the Base of Ake, Abeokuta, Nigeria.
- Jackson Ikot Amah. For services to the Government of Nigeria.
- Galadima Boi, District Head, Gwoza District, Dikwa Emirate, Bornu Province, Nigeria.
- The Reverend Seth Irunsewe Kale, Dean of the Anglican Colleges, Nigeria.
- Azariah Olusegun Ransome-Kuti, Assistant Medical Storekeeper, Nigeria.
- Isaac Anieka Mbanefo. For public services in Nigeria.
- Haji Yassin Mohamed, Chief of the Habr Awal, Mohamed Esa, Derian, British Somaliland.
- Chief Adam Sapi, Chief of Uhehe, Tanganyika.

=== Companion of the Imperial Service Order (ISO) ===
Home Civil Service.

- Stanley Vincent Beattest, Chief Executive Officer, Air Ministry. (Wimbledon, S.W.20.)
- Frank Herbert Bell, Principal, Department of Scientific and Industrial Research. (Twickenham.)
- Herbert Vinson Bransgrove, Chief Executive Officer, Ministry of Education. (Worcester Park, Surrey.)
- Henry Forbes Calder, MC, Ministry of Pensions Representative in Australia and New Zealand.
- Cyril George Chinn, Assistant Director, Ministry of Supply. (Welwyn Garden City.)
- Hugh Clausen, OBE BSc AMIEE, Senior Principal Scientific Officer, Admiralty. (Bradford-on-Avon.)
- Arthur Herbert Elliott, Controller, Estate Duty Office, Ministry of Finance, Northern Ireland. (Belfast.)
- Stanley Gilbert, lately Director of Accounts, Ministry of National Insurance. (Boscombe.)
- Wilfrid Archibald Goddard, lately General Manager, Carlisle State Management District, Home Office. (Wetherall, Cumberland.)
- Albert William Gould, Superintending Examiner, Board of Trade. (Leigh-on-Sea.)
- Hugh Kinghorn Grey, MBE, Grade II Officer, Branch B, Foreign Office. (Epsom.)
- Percival Charles Ingram, Staff Controller, London Postal Region, General Post Office. (Northwood, Middlesex.)
- Fred Johnston, Regional Director, Ministry of Fuel and Power. (Whitley Bay.)
- William Millington Limb, lately Chief Administrative Officer, Office of the Public Trustee. (St. Albans.)
- Frank Spinks Lumbard, General Inspector, Department of Health for Scotland. (Edinburgh.)
- George Charles Shepherd Machon, Assistant Secretary, War Office. (Northwood, Middlesex.)
- John Henry Phillips, MBE, Principal, Ministry of Labour & National Service. (Highbury, N.5.)
- Frederick Walter Shiner, FRICS, Assistant Chief Quantity Surveyor, Ministry of Works. (Grays, Essex.).
- Philip Stratton, FRICS FLAS, Provincial Land Commissioner, Ministry of Agriculture and Fisheries. (Worcester.)
- Arthur Herbert Thieme, Principal, Ministry of Food. (Godalming, Surrey.)
- Andrew Thom, Principal, War Damage Commission and Central Land Board. (Tadworth, Surrey.)
- William Henry Umfreville, Assistant Accountant and Comptroller General, Board of Inland Revenue. (Hove.)
- Frank Whitham, Collector, Dover, Board of Customs and Excise. (Dover.)
- John Ernest Whiting, Chief Executive Officer, Ministry of Local Government and Planning. (Coulsdon, Surrey.)
- Thomas Wooddisse, Secretary, British Museum (Natural History). (Cuckfield, Surrey.)

Australian States and Southern Rhodesia

- Charles Claus Gale, MVO MC, Secretary and Permanent Head of the Public Works Department, State of Victoria.
- Danby Eugene McLoughlin, lately Chief Agriculturist, Department of Agriculture and Lands, Southern Rhodesia.
- Arthur Henry Peters, Director of Lands and Permanent Head of the Lands Department, State of South Australia.

Colonial Service

- Valentine Charles George Gatrell, Government Printer, Singapore.
- John Laird Dawson Gibson, lately Collector of Customs, Shipping Master and Registrar of Shipping, Bermuda.
- Walter Organ, Workshop Manager, Public Works Department, Tanganyika.
- Graham Worthington, Government Printer, Gold Coast.

=== Order of the Companions of Honour (CH) ===
- The Right Honourable Sidney George Holland, Prime Minister of New Zealand.

=== British Empire Medal (BEM) ===
Military Division

Royal Navy

- Chief Petty Officer (T.A.S.I.) John Walter Noel Bain, C/JX.126741.
- Quartermaster Sergeant (T.) Charles Henry Barrett, PO.X.2296, Royal Marines.
- Petty Officer (T.A.S.I.) Arthur Alfred Frederick Betts, DSM, C/JX.134446.
- Chief Petty Officer Leslie Brain, D/JX.132051.
- Master-at-Arms Alfred James Cutler, D/MX.65792.
- Air Artificer (3) David Vincent Date, L/FX.100850.
- Chief Electrical Artificer John Ernest Denney, DSM, C/MX.45614.
- Chief Petty Officer Charles Frank Guyatt, C/JX.127177.
- Chief Engine Room Artificer Arthur Hall, P/MX.60160.
- Quartermaster Sergeant (C.) Albert Edward Small Hartland, Ply.X.391, Royal Marines.
- Petty Officer Stoker Mechanic Frederick Charles Hawker, P/KX.87827.
- Petty Officer (Q.R.I.) Leslie Alan Herbert Hawkey, D/JX.145039.
- Chief Wren Cook (O) Peggy Gladys Heard, 19519, Women's Royal Naval Service.
- Stores Chief Petty Officer William Henry Hibberd, P/M.37250.
- Petty Officer (B.T.1.) Frederick Robert Hipkins, D/JX.157.124.
- Chief Petty Officer Writer Leonard George Archibald Jenner, P/MX.45728.
- Chief Petty Officer Telegraphist James Joseph Kennett, D.S.M., P/JX.127822.
- Chief Wren Quarters Assistant Janet Nield Logan, 2024, Women's Royal Naval Service.
- Chief Engine Room Artificer Charles George Mills, C/MX.768900.
- Chief Petty Officer Steward Hiram Wyndham Morgan, P/L.14753.
- Chief Yeoman of Signals Frederick Joseph Rainsbury, D/JX.130447.
- Chief Petty Officer (T.A.S.I.) William Henry Rodwell, D/JX.130871.
- Corporal (T.) (Acting Sergeant (T.)) Frederick James Sankey, Po.X.3886, Royal Marines.
- Acting Chief Petty Officer Steward Joseph Schembri, Malta/LX.21298.
- Stores Chief Petty Officer (S) Henry Frederick George Sheppard, P/MX.54611.
- Chief Electrical Artificer Thomas Albert Sparkes, D/MX.56259.
- Chief Air Artificer Walter John Revill Stocks, L/FX.75183.
- Chief Petty Officer Joseph Bernard Donald Alphonso Towell, D/J.106521.
- Sick Berth Chief Petty Officer Albert Lewis Walker, D/MX.47903.
- Chief Petty Officer George Frederick Williams, Mauritius Naval Volunteer Force.
- Marine (D) Fred Beever, Ch.X.118708, Royal Marines.

Army

- No.22258011 Private Alfred William Bairstow, Royal Army Medical Corps.
- No.GC.13566 Company-Sergeant-Major Oseini Bazabarimi, The Gold Coast Regiment, Royal West African Frontier Force.
- No.5947082 Sergeant William Beale, The Bedfordshire and Hertfordshire Regiment.
- No.926330 Battery-Quartermaster-Sergeant John Beattie, Royal Regiment of Artillery, Territorial Army.
- No.21143085 Sergeant Bhokbahadur Gaining, 6th Gurkha Rifles.
- No.6135668 Colour Sergeant Walter Henry Bowles, The East Surrey Regiment.
- No.1920542 Staff-Sergeant Leonard John Buck, Corps of Royal Engineers.
- No.2877756 Battery-Quartermaster-Sergeant John Morrison Burgess, Royal Regiment of Artillery, Territorial Army.
- No.1878094 Staff-Sergeant Harold William Edwin Caplin, Corps of Royal Engineers.
- No.7662582 Staff-Sergeant Albert Sidney Clay, Royal Army Pay Corps.
- No.2874852 Staff-Sergeant (acting) William Crighton, Intelligence Corps.
- No.15002407 Sergeant Harold Joseph Crocker, Royal Corps of Signals.
- No.309477 Sergeant Alexander Dickson, Royal Army Veterinary Corps.
- Sergeant-Major Joseph Dinku, Bechuanaland Protectorate Police.
- No.54753 Warrant Officer Class II (acting) Leslie William Dobbs, Army Catering Corps.
- No.NA.128201 Sergeant Francis Fajuyi, Nigeria Signal Squadron, Royal West African Frontier Force.
- No.SLA.26032 Sergeant James Foya, Sierra Leone Regiment Training Centre, Royal West African Frontier Force
- No.6711216 Sergeant (Pipe Major) John Richard Franklin, London Irish Rifles, The Royal Ulster Rifles, Territorial Army.
- No.22283286 Sergeant John Thomas Freeley, Royal Regiment of Artillery, Territorial Army.
- No.S/214506 Staff-Sergeant (acting) Peter Lincoln Fussell, Royal Army Service Corps.
- No.W/31435 Sergeant Anne Elsie Hoar, Women's Royal Army Corps.
- No.W/215135 Sergeant-Cook Emma Hurt, Auxiliary Territorial Service.
- No.5883042 Sergeant William Kirton, Army Catering Corps.
- No.21004088 Corporal Herbert Lucas, Corps of Royal Engineers.
- No.1878080 Staff-Sergeant Herbert Moor, Corps of Royal Engineers.
- No.305158 Squadron Quartermaster-Corporal Arthur Stanley Mundon, Royal Horse Guards.
- No.U.466 Company-Sergeant-Major Jeremiya Odokpira, East African Electrical and Mechanical Engineers.
- No.KML/307089 Regimental Sergeant-Major Joseph Adhiambo Ondwas, East African Construction Forces (Military).
- No.1079984 Sergeant Frank Oulsnam, Army Catering Corps.
- No.21018249 Lance-Corporal (acting) Robert Henry Parrish, Royal Army Ordnance Corps.
- No.7585508 Staff-Sergeant Arthur Henry Quick, Corps of Royal Electrical and Mechanical Engineers.
- No.4192146 Sergeant Edwin Roberts, Intelligence Corps.
- No.3445305 Sergeant Stanley Smith, The King's Own Scottish Borderers.
- No.21002086 Sergeant Harold Spencer, Royal Regiment of Artillery.
- Band Sergeant-Major Eldon Leigh Stewart, Jamaica Military Band.
- No.22228116 Company Quartermaster-Sergeant Samuel Stewart, Corps of Royal Military Police, Territorial Army.
- No.4802017 Sergeant Frank Stockdale, Royal Corps of Signals.
- No.5249919 Sergeant George Alfred Tanner, The Worcestershire Regiment.
- No.4270089 Battery Quartermaster-Sergeant (now Warrant Officer Class II) Marshall Joseph Wild, Royal Regiment of Artillery, Territorial Army.
- No.3852544 Sergeant Sidney Williams, Army Catering Corps.
- No.790698 Warrant Officer Class II (acting) George Wright, Royal Army Ordnance Corps.

Royal Air Force

- 563021 Flight Sergeant Reginald Oscar Arthur Abbott.
- 516911 Flight Sergeant Rex Holmes Colyer.
- 517381 Flight Sergeant John William Craig.
- 2683515 Flight Sergeant Charles Elliott Erskine, Royal Auxiliary Air Force.
- 561555 Flight Sergeant George Todd Griffiths.
- 517426 Flight Sergeant Albert John Hammond.
- 562726 Flight Sergeant Geoffrey Jack Wilson Hare.
- 563558 Flight Sergeant Frederick Arthur Hawkins.
- 560989 Flight Sergeant Richard Farquharson Hewlett.
- 549708 Flight Sergeant Thomas Glynn James.
- 891151 Flight Sergeant Helen Miller, Women's Royal Air Force.
- 520922 Flight Sergeant William Octovius Morgan.
- 510313. Flight Sergeant James Parkin Oxley.
- 518353 Flight Sergeant Ernest Frederick Townsend.
- 516712 Flight Sergeant Frederick Young.
- 1473858 Acting Flight Sergeant Charles Douglas Collyer.
- 539934 Acting Flight Sergeant James Alfred Taylor.
- 922292 Sergeant Geoffrey Roy Dawes.
- 896358 Sergeant Lorenza Dowdeswell, Women's Royal Air Force.
- 527410 Sergeant Edward George Ellis.
- 1725042 Sergeant Frederick George Froud.
- 1310242 Sergeant Nicholas Garvey Kelly.
- 566279 Sergeant Arnott McIvor.
- 591930 Sergeant Howard Royston Thomas.
- 644409 Sergeant William Edward Weatherill.
- 579751 Acting Sergeant Eric Clive Dunn.
- 1155544 Corporal Edward Albert Chapman.
- 574254 Corporal William Patrick Megraw.
- 578972 Corporal Bruce Peter Rowden.
- 1015290 Corporal Sydney Herbert Dimeny Seek.
- 611783 Corporal Leslie Chapman Thurston.

Civil Division

United Kingdom

- Walter George Allen, Cable Room Assistant Supervisor, London Telecommunications Region, General Post Office. (North Finchley, N.12.)
- Francis George Alsop, Erector, National Smelting Co. Ltd., Avonmouth. (Bristol.)
- Albert Appleby, Shop Convenor, Rolls-Royce Ltd., Derby.
- Robert Thirlway Arkley, Tool Maker, Projectile & Engineering Co. Ltd., Battersea. (Balham, SW.12.)
- Arthur Walter Askew, Senior Security Officer, Foreign Office. (Finchley, N.3.)
- Christopher Sidney Aveson, Assistant Foreman, Southern Gas Board. (Southampton.)
- Mary Lilian Janet Ayling, Supervisor, Telephone Exchange, Brighton. (Hove.)
- Frank Baker, Honorary Collector, Savings Group, Huthwaite, Mansfield.
- Albert Alfred Battes, Warehouse Checker, North Thames Gas Board. (Lower Edmonton, N.9.)
- Alexander Black, Mail Contractor, Taynuilt Post Office, Argyll.
- Laura Blackburn, Weaver, John Halliday & Sons, Bradford.
- Michele Bonnici, Shipwright Supervisor, HM Dockyard, Malta.
- Edith Boustead, Weaver, Weaving Training Centre, Ferguson Bros. Ltd., Carlisle.
- Doris Hilda Bowen, Sub-Postmistress, Clare Street Post Office, Cardiff.
- Harry Boyd, Trench Inspector, East Midlands Gas Board. (Sheffield.)
- Thomas Frank Bray, Blacksmith, Royal Naval Air Station, St. Merryn, Cornwall. (Padstow.)
- Harry Brinsdon, Tube Drawer, Tubes Ltd., Birmingham.
- Arthur Harper Brown, Chief Officer, Edinburgh Depot, Scottish Ambulance Service, (Edinburgh.)
- James Hamilton Brown, Foreman Linesman, South West Scotland Electricity Board. (Kilmarnock.)
- William Bruce, Assistant Harbourmaster, Crinan Canal. (Argyll.)
- John Waller Buffam, Assistant Inspector, Head Post Office, Leeds.
- Madge Bullock, Weaver, George Walmsley & Sons Ltd., Burnley.
- William James Campbell, Section Leader, Northern Area Fire Brigade, Scotland. (Wick.)
- Nathaniel Cank, Outdoor Superintendent, Stormont Estate, Belfast.
- Albert Henry Chambers, Chargehand Jointer, Midlands Electricity Board. (Birmingham.)
- William Stanley Chant, Head Herdsman, Wherwell, Andover.
- Sydney William Saxton Cockram, Works Inspector, Treforest Repair Factories, British Overseas Airways Corporation. (Cardiff.)
- Anthony Conlan, Overman, Whitehill Colliery, Scottish Division, National Coal Board. (Rosewell.)
- George William Cooke, Instructor, Government Training Centre, Leeds. (Harrogate.)
- Emily Courteney, Honorary Collector and Secretary, Street Savings Group, Bootle.
- Ellen Daglish, Honorary Collector, Street Savings Group, Morpeth.
- Gwilym Idris David, Colliery Repairer, Cwm Colliery, South Western Division, National Coal Board. (Pontypridd.)
- Hubert Lewis Davies, Tool Room Grinder, Folland Aircraft Ltd., Southampton.
- Thomas Davies, Foreman, Sheppard & Sons Ltd., Bridgend.
- Harry Percival Day, Works Technical Grade III, Royal Aircraft Establishment, Ministry of Supply, Farnborough.
- Osmond George Dellenty, MM, Chief Inspector, War Department Constabulary. (Corsham.)
- Frederick Dorrington, Fitter, Birmingham Factory, General Post Office.,
- William Edmunds, Chargehand, Ministry of Supply Storage Depot, Coleford.
- Archibald Felix Edwards, Sub-Officer, Berkshire and Reading Fire Brigade. (Sonning, Berkshire.)
- William Elliot, Mechanical Foreman, Eastfield Motive Power Depot, Railway Executive, Scottish Region. (Glasgow.)
- James Gordon Ellis, Omnibus Driver, W. Alexander & Sons Ltd., Scottish Omnibuses Ltd. (Strathdon.)
- George Loudon Findlay, Foreman Sheet Iron Worker, Thermotank Ltd., Glasgow.
- Adam Eraser, Boatswain, SS Rora Head, North of Scotland, Orkney & Shetland Steam Navigation Company, Aberdeen. (Edinburgh.)
- Wilfred Francis Friend, Head Gardener, North-West European District, Imperial War Graves Commission. (Brussels.)
- Alfred Edward Fryer, Supervisor (M) (Travelling), Telephone Manager's Office, Sheffield.
- Hilda Ethel Garwood, Forewoman, E. N. Mason Ltd., Colchester.
- Edward David Gay, Sergeant, Plymouth City Police.
- John Gent, Byeworker, Thorne Colliery, North Eastern Division, National Coal Board. (Doncaster.)
- Albert Vernon Gibson, Machinist, Crewe Locomotive Works. For services to the Ambulance Movement.
- Robert Glen, Oncost Worker, Carberry Colliery, Scottish Division, National Coal Board. (Tranent.)
- William Thomas Greaves, Foreman Bread Baker, A.D. Wimbush & Son Ltd., Birmingham.
- Joshua Green, Senior Manual Attendant, Science Museum. (Fulham.)
- Frederick Greenaway, Chargehand Fitter, Southern Division, British Electricity Authority. (Uxbridge.)
- David Henry Griffiths, Linesman, Merseyside & North Wales Electricity Board. (Llanberis.)
- Harry Reginald Guley, Chief Inspector, Thames Valley Traction Co. Ltd. (Reading.)
- Alexander Haggart, Foreman Steel Erector, Alex. Findlay & Sons Ltd., Motherwell. (Dumbarton.)
- Harry Haigh, Yard Foreman, Wood Bros. Glass Co. Ltd., Barnsley.
- Samuel Henshaw, Coal Face Worker, Butterley Colliery, East Midlands Division, National Coal Board. (Ilkeston.)
- Thomas John Heskett, Honorary Organiser and Collector, Street Savings Group, Upper Edmonton, London, N.18.
- Joseph Reay Heslop, Traffic Manager, Burradon Colliery, Northern (Northumberland & Cumberland) Division, National Coal Board. (Dudley.)
- Thomas Hey, Chief Inspector, Yorkshire Copper Works Ltd., Leeds.
- Isaac William Ernest Hill, Truck Weighman, North Eastern Gas Board. (Leeds.)
- Harold Hindle, Depot Manager, Accrington House Coal Distribution (Emergency) Scheme. (Accrington.)
- Arthur Hinks, Colliery Deputy, Holly Bank Colliery, West Midlands Division, National Coal Board. (Essington.)
- Nathaniel James Hiscock, School Staff Instructor, Haileybury & Imperial Service College, Combined Cadet Force. (Hertford.)
- Margaret Emily Hoare, Superintendent Storewoman, Supplies Department, General Post Office. (Fulham, SW.6.)
- Jonathan Hodgson, Distribution Foreman, Workington Unit, Northern Gas Board. (Workington.)
- Mary Holdsworth, Deputy County Organiser, Yorkshire, East Riding, Women's Voluntary Services. (Hunmanby.)
- Ronald Holmes, Mechanic-in-Charge III, Post Office Garage, Buxton.
- Hubert Walton Hope, Foreman Electrician, Cowan, Sheldon & Co. Ltd., Carlisle.
- Edward Hopkins, Civil Warrant Officer, No. 254 (Aberdare) Squadron, Air Training Corps. (Glamorgan.)
- John Stanhope Howarth, Foundry Chargehand, Magnesium Elektron Ltd., Manchester. (Radcliffe.)
- John William Jackman, Office Keeper, Cabinet Office. (Surbiton.)
- Christine Jackson, Warden of the Nurses Home, Royal Victoria Hospital, Belfast.
- Wilfred Joseph Jenkin, Station Officer, Cornwall Fire Brigade. (Newquay.)
- Albert John Jennens, Master Craftsman, Stevens & Williams Ltd., Brierley Hill.
- Florence Jevons, Drawing Frame Operator, Carpet Trades Ltd., Kidderminster.
- Octavious Hiley Jones, Inspector, Post Office Engineering Department, Pontypool.
- Percy McDonald Jones, MM, Technician, Class I, Telephone Manager's Office, Bristol.
- Winifred Judd, Centre Organiser, Abercarn, Women's Voluntary Services. (Newbridge.)
- Leonard George Juniper, Chief Photoprinter, Principal Probate Registry, Supreme Court of Judicature. (New Maiden, Surrey.)
- George Wesley Keith, Postal and Telegraph Officer, Head Post Office, Belfast.
- Edwin Thomas Lancey. Regulating Leading Hand of Labourers, Admiralty. (Plymouth.)
- Felix Harry Lax, Band Sergeant, Queen Victoria School for the Sons of Scottish Sailors, Soldiers and Airmen, Dunblane.
- Frederick Augustus Lovett, Superintendent, Insulation Factory, British Thomson-Houston Co. Ltd. (Rugby.)
- John MacIsaac, Quartermaster, SS Mahseer, Thos. and Jno. Brocklebank Ltd., Liverpool. (Glasgow.)
- William McMillan, Leading Hand Fitter, David Rowan & Co. Ltd., Glasgow.
- Usuman Marua, Grade I Battalion Imam (Mohammedan Chaplain), 2nd Battalion, The Nigeria Regiment.
- James George Edward Massey, Safety Officer, South Leicester Colliery, East Midlands Division, National Coal Board. (Ellistown.)
- Robert Mather, Haulage Engine Driver, Bold Colliery, North Western Division, National Coal Board. (St. Helens.)
- Fred Mellington, Haulage Engine Driver, Silverhill Colliery, East Midlands Division, National Coal Board. (Sutton-in-Ashfield.)
- Gordon Mitchell, Constable, Coatbridge Burgh Police. For services to the Scottish Police Federation.
- Harold Mitchell, Postman, Head Post Office, Dover.
- George Henry Moore, Member, Coast Life Saving Corps, Douglas, Isle of Man.
- Clement Gladstone Moores, Senior Leading Patrolman, Ministry of Supply Storage Depot, Wortley, Yorkshire. (Barnsley.)
- Helen Morgan, Assistant, Centre Staff, Aberdeen, Women's Voluntary Services.
- Samuel Morgan, Underground Switchman, Newdigate Colliery, West Midlands Division, National Coal Board. (Nuneaton.)
- Anthony Padua Morris, Station Warden, RAF Changi, Singapore.
- Peter Mulheron, Brusher, Southfield Colliery, Scottish Division, National Coal Board. (Shotts.)
- Francis Mulryan, Mechanical Foreman, North Western Electricity Board. (Manchester.)
- George Murray, Foreman of Trades (Armourer), No. 12 Maintenance Unit, RAF Kirkbride. (Carlisle.)
- Henry Percival Musk, Storehouseman, Royal Naval Hospital Haslar.
- Patrick Myers, Chief Blast Furnace Foreman, Gjers Mills & Co. Ltd., Middlesbrough.
- Percy Russel Nicholson, Senior Foreman of Storehouses, Admiralty. (Bath.)
- George Henry Norton, Tool Room Foreman, Brecknell, Munro & Rogers Ltd., Bristol.
- George Painter, Wire Flattening Mill Foreman, Stourbridge Rolling Mills Ltd. (Dudley.)
- Jonathan Parkinson, Head Foreman Shipwright (Central Yard), William Gray & Co. Ltd., West Hartlepool.
- Gertrude Pearce, Honorary Collector, Street Savings Group, Sheffield.
- James Pettigrew, Quartermaster, MV Port MacQuarrie, Port Line Ltd., London. (Glasgow.)
- William George Griffin Pinfold, Temporary Mechanic, National Physical Laboratory. (Willesden, NW.10.)
- Wiliam Pinnell, Registered Dock Worker, Newport.
- George Edward Pritchard, Checkweighman, Blackball Colliery, Durham Division, National Coal Board. (West Hartlepool.)
- Arthur James Puttock, Works Technical Grade II, Royal Aircraft Establishment, Ministry of Supply, Farnborough.
- Thomas Ramsey Rainey, Chief Inspector (Railway Operating), Ulster Transport Authority. (Coleraine.)
- Harvey Richard George Reeve, Station Engineer, Aeronautical Inspection Directorate Test House, Ministry of Supply, Harefield.
- Thomas Reynolds, Storekeeper, Granton Gas Works, Scottish Gas Board. (Edinburgh.)
- Edith Maud Richardson, Overseer (F), Head Post Office, Cumbergate, Peterborough.
- Walter Richardson, Draughtsman, Senior Grade, Ministry of Agriculture and Fisheries. (Upper Tooting, SW.17.).
- Sydney Richens, Laboratory Worker "A", Armament Research Establishment, Ministry of Supply, Sevenoaks. (Abbey Wood, SE.2.)
- Robert Powell Robertson, Manager, Machynlleth Undertaking, Wales Gas Board. (Machynlleth.)
- Albert Robinson, Donkeyman greaser, SS Baron Dunmor, Temple Steamship Co., London. (South Shields.)
- Eutychus Edwin Robinson, Class A III Litho Prover, Ordnance Survey Office, Southampton. (Eastleigh.)
- Harry Robinson, Checkweighman, Lofthouse Colliery, North Eastern Division, National Coal Board. (Wakefield.)
- John Robinson, MM, Chief Officer, Class I, HM Borstal Institution, Feltham.
- Robert Rodger, Senior Assistant (Scientific), HM Underwater Detection Establishment, Portland. (Weymouth.)
- Joseph Richard Rowell, Storekeeper, HM Coastguard Store Depot, Pitsea. (Leyton, E.10.)
- William Richard Savage, Custodian at Castle Acre Priory, Norfolk. (King's Lynn.)
- William Shakespeare, Dope Shop Foreman, Percival Aircraft Ltd., Luton.
- John Sinclair, Farm Manager, Dalmeny Home Farm, near Edinburgh.
- Fred Smith, Assistant Overseer Grade I, Admiralty. (Barrow-in-Furness.)
- John Greer Smith, Driller, Albion Motors Ltd., Glasgow.
- Eileen Sowden, Deputy County Borough Organiser, Scunthorpe, Women's Voluntary Services. (Scunthorpe.)
- Hugh Gordon Steele, Foreman, J. Mackie & Son Ltd., Belfast
- Adam Storey, Inshore Fisherman, Newbiggin, Northumberland.
- George Hipolite Sullivan, Workshop Foreman, War Office Establishment, Nairobi, Kenya.
- Doris Grace Susans, Honorary Collector, Street Savings Group, Gillingham.
- Henry Daniel Swann, Foreman, Laurence, Scott & Electrometers Ltd., Norwich.
- William Swinnerton, Shift Foreman, John Summers & Sons Ltd., Shotton, Chester.
- John Graham Taylor, Foreman Leading Stoker, North Eastern Division, British Electricity Authority. (Stockton-on-Tees.)
- John Thompson, Chargehand Fitter, Lostock Gralam Works, Imperial Chemical Industries Ltd. (Northwich.)
- Frederick George Timberlake, Fitter Chargehand, South Eastern Division, British Electricity Authority. (Hastings.)
- Charlton Todd, Coal Filler, Prestwick Colliery, Northern (Northumberland & Cumberland) Division, National Coal Board. (Newcastle.)
- Sidney Turner, Head Dock Foreman, Hull Port Association for Imported Fruit and Vegetables. (Hull.)
- Frank James Walker, Mains Foreman, South Eastern Gas Board. (Camberwell, SE.5.)
- Walter Ward, Coal Sampler, North Eastern Division, National Coal Board. (Chapeltown.)
- Frank Wealthy, Assistant Switchboard Attendant, South Eastern Division, British Electricity Authority. (Wallington.)
- Henry William Weatherall, Donkeyman, SS Arawa, Shaw, Savill & Albion Co. Ltd., London. (Poplar, E.14.)
- Margaret F. Wilkinson, JP, Centre Organiser, Berwick-on-Tweed, Women's Voluntary Services.
- Walter Wilkinson, Underground Enginewright, Snowdown Colliery, South Eastern Division, National Coal Board. (Nonington.)
- Wyndham Goulds Williams, Shunter, Class I, Barry Docks. (Barry Island.)
- Howard William Winslow, Supervisor I, Maintenance, Dortmund, Control Commission for Germany (British Element).
- John William Winterson, MM, Chief Paper Keeper, Air Ministry. (Clapham, SW.9.)
- William Wright, Assistant Foreman Bricklayer, Workington Iron & Steel Co., Sheffield. (Workington.)
- John Young, Traffic Superintendent, No. 14 Maintenance Unit, RAF Carlisle.
- Mabel Georgina Young, Chief Supervisor, London Directory Enquiry, General Post Office.

Commonwealth of Australia

- Charley DeLongville. For services in collecting for charities in Port MacDonnell, South Australia.

Colonial Empire

- Ignatius John Sexton, Jailor, Aden Prison, Aden.
- Demetrios Theocleous Piyiotis, Inspector of Water Supplies, Water Supply and Irrigation Department, Cyprus.
- Joseph Karapet Karapetian, Inspector of Water Supplies, Water Supply and Irrigation Department, Cyprus.
- Abdullah bin Haji Jalil, Clerical Officer, Class III, General Clerical Service, Federation of Malaya.
- George Austin Hay, Locomotive Driver, Malayan Railway, Federation of Malaya.
- Abu Bakar bin Haji Omar, Penghulu Special Grade, Ulu Ring, Federation of Malaya.
- Krishnan s/o Vengadasalam, Linesman, Telecommunications Department, Federation of Malaya.
- Abdul Rahman bin Haji Othman, Malay Teacher, Federation of Malay.
- To Yee, 1st Class Clerk, Junior Clerical Service, Hong Kong.
- Jaswant Singh s/o Satbachan Singh, Assistant District Commandant, Kenya Police Reserve, Kenya.
- Kithinji Njage, Laboratory Assistant, Medical Research Laboratory, Kenya.
- Joseph Lewis Bonnici, Enforcement Officer, Department of Labour, Malta.
- Paul Agius, Nurse, Isolation Hospital, Malta.
- Simon Onyekwelu Ofoedu, Works Superintendent, Onitsha Rural Areas, Native Authority, Nigeria.
- Taliban bin Dandiong, lately Native Chief, Grade I, Tambunan, North Borneo.
- Haji Sardheed Ismail, Somali Assistant (Administration), British Somaliland.
- Ismail Gulaid, Judge of the Berbera Subordinate Court, British Somaliland.
- Petro Itossi Marealle, Chief of Vunjo, Moshi District, Tanganyika.
- Wabu Musa, Adviser, Nyasa Council, Songea District, Tanganyika.
- Gulamali Juma Natha, Senior Produce Examiner, Agricultural Department, Zanzibar.

=== Royal Red Cross (RRC) ===
Army

- Major Dorothy Olive Wakeham, ARRC (206517), Queen Alexandra's Royal Army Nursing Corps.

==== Associate of the Royal Red Cross (ARRC) ====
Royal Navy

- Lucy Phyllis Dewey, Senior Nursing Sister, Queen Alexandra's Royal Naval Nursing Service Reserve.
- Dorothy Haigh, Head Nursing Member, Voluntary Aid Detachment.

Army

- Captain Margaret Gibb Davidson (254505), Queen Alexandra's Royal Army Nursing Corps.
- Captain Winifred Mary Hall (213848), Queen Alexandra's Royal Army Nursing Corps.

Royal Air Force

- Flight Officer Marjorie Marion McLaren (6338), Princess Mary's Royal Air Force Nursing Service.
- Flight Officer Grace Evelyn Kirby Walker (5469), Princess Mary's Royal Air Force Nursing Service.

=== Air Force Cross ===
Royal Air Force

- Squadron Leader Peter Reginald Casement, DSO DFC (44188).
- Squadron Leader Leonard Henry Cherry, DFC (114723).
- Squadron Leader John Chegwyn Thomas Downey, DFC (42208).
- Squadron Leader George Gray, DFC (128543).
- Squadron Leader Elvin Darley Pennington (42146).
- Squadron Leader Derek Shannon Vaughan Rake (124494).
- Acting Squadron Leader Arthur Edward Callard, DFC (126495).
- Acting Squadron Leader Jack Ratcliff Robinson (110565).
- Acting Squadron Leader Robert Horace Smyth (127197).
- Acting Squadron Leader George Walter Vowles (123506).
- Flight Lieutenant Stanislan Jan Andrzejewski (500160).
- Flight Lieutenant Harry Bennett (169108).
- Flight Lieutenant Ronald James Brain (177447).
- Flight Lieutenant Anthony George Brown, DFC (146747).
- Flight Lieutenant Arthur Campey (181221).
- Flight Lieutenant David Dattner (182273).
- Flight Lieutenant Basil Dorian Brett Lewis, DFM (49276).
- Flight Lieutenant Stuart Munro Mackay (125541).
- Flight Lieutenant Joseph Keith Maddison (162143).
- Flight Lieutenant William Patrick Peedell (161598).
- Flight Lieutenant Bertram Guy Roberts (55583).
- Flight Lieutenant Alan James Sharman (150611).
- Flight Lieutenant John Alexander Simpson, DFC (150404).
- Flight Lieutenant Wallace Haig Woodgate Spencer (59339).
- Flight Lieutenant Russell Reay Waughman, DFC (171904).
- Flight Lieutenant Ronald Kenneth Wilson (115949).
- Master Pilot Wladyslaw Grobelny (780566).
- Master Pilot Bernard William Thomas Horn (1314632).

Royal Navy

- Acting Commander (E) Peter Summer Wilson.
- Lieutenant Joseph Elliot.

Southern Rhodesia Air Force

- Captain Harold Hawkins, SRAF.

==== Bar to Air Force Cross ====
Royal Air Force

- Group Captain Thomas Gilbert Mahaddie, DSO DFC AFC (44456).
- Flight Lieutenant Peter Donald Thorne, AFC (125469).

=== Air Force Medal ===
- 578390 Flight Sergeant Gordon Acklam.
- 651365 Flight Sergeant John Smith Cadden, DFM.
- 1419299 Flight Sergeant Edison Arthur Corbett.
- 1620761 Flight Sergeant Norman Cross.
- 1672028 Flight Sergeant Eric Davies.
- 1713743 Flight Sergeant John Alister Eliston.
- 1623501 Flight Sergeant George William Ford.
- 1586631 Flight Sergeant Lawrence Frank Gapper.
- 2209306 Flight Sergeant William Edmund Lowther.
- 1458998 Flight Sergeant William Joseph MacAusland.
- 536134 Flight Sergeant Robert John McFadden.
- 578190 Flight Sergeant Donald George Munro.
- 574514 Flight Sergeant Richard John Snell.
- 1892228 Sergeant Cecil Raymond Colkin.
- 1852123 Sergeant Frank Christopher Slee.

=== King's Commendation for Valuable Service in the Air ===
Royal Air Force

- Acting Group Captain Brian James Roberts Roberts.
- Wing Commander Anthony Douglas Forster, DFC (90290).
- Squadron Leader Henry David Archer, DFC (128870).
- Squadron Leader Robert Sidney Radley, DFC (83263).
- Acting Squadron Leader Gordon Hampton, DFC (50204).
- Flight Lieutenant Rodney Allen (150834).
- Flight Lieutenant David Lawson Arthy (152434).
- Flight Lieutenant Anthony John Couchman (151462).
- Flight Lieutenant Ernest Alfred John Haskett (52867).
- Flight Lieutenant John Bryce Ferguson Keddie (172567).
- Flight Lieutenant Peter Gordon Marman (183953).
- Flight Lieutenant Dugald Cameron Matheson (188150).
- Flight Lieutenant William Ovington Mitchell, DFC (158293).
- Flight Lieutenant Horace Gerald Munday (187734).
- Flight Lieutenant Jack Netherwood, DFC (182538).
- Flight Lieutenant Arthur James Robert Robson, DFC (173300).
- Flight Lieutenant Edward Michael Sparrow, DFC (124661).
- Flight Lieutenant Sydney Wilkinson (56708).
- Flying Officer Ronald Geoffrey Bainbridge (202492).
- Flying Officer Peter William Gee (700746).
- Flying Officer Walter George Woods (168474).
- 1605277 Flight Sergeant John Herbert William King.
- 4016214 Flight Sergeant James Slaven Muir, DFC.
- 524268 Flight Sergeant William Wallace Simpson.
- 2238497 Sergeant Nicholas Calvert Bennett.
- 1606257 Sergeant Leslie George Revell.
- 575730 Sergeant Roy Frederick Stacey.

=== King's Police and Fire Services Medal ===
England and Wales

Police

- Harry Hughes Herman, OBE, Chief Constable, York City Police Force.
- Alan Frederick Plume, Chief Constable, Norwich City Police Force.
- Reginald Ernest Breffit, Chief Constable, East Sussex Constabulary.
- Herbert Spencer Price, OBE, Chief Constable, Bradford City Police Force.
- William Rees, Chief Constable, Stockport Borough Police Force.
- Adolphus Worthington Fothergill, Second Assistant Chief Constable, Liverpool City Police Force.
- Robert Charles Wainwright, BEM, Chief Superintendent, City of London Police Force.
- John Stanley McCrone, Chief Superintendent, Lancashire Constabulary.
- Cyril Mervyn Millward Cook, Superintendent, Bristol City Police Force. (At present serving as Instructor, Police College.)
- George Frederick Hickinbotham, Chief Superintendent, Metropolitan Police.
- William Alfred Morley, Chief Inspector, Metropolitan Police.
- William Bertram Richards, MVO, Chief Officer, British Transport Commission Police.

Fire Service

- Arthur Hedley Johnstone, CBE, Chief Officer, Surrey Fire Brigade.
- William Edward Sweet, MBE, Chief Officer, Smethwick and West Bromwich Fire Brigade.
- William Francis Redman, Chief Officer, Swansea Fire Brigade.
- James Thomas Hole, Divisional Officer, Birmingham Fire and Ambulance Service.
- Herbert Alfred Charles Smith, Chief Officer, Derby Fire Brigade.

Scotland

- Gilbert McIlwrick, Chief Superintendent, Glasgow City Police Force.
- Alexander George Roy, Chief Superintendent, Edinburgh City Police Force.

Northern Ireland

- George Albert Crawford, Head Constable, Royal Ulster Constabulary.

Australia

Police

- Herbert Cyril Raymond Randall, Superintendent 2nd Class, New South Wales Police Force.
- James Cornelius Norman Devenish, Superintendent 2nd Class, New South Wales Police Force.
- William Lindsay Creswell Alford, Superintendent, 3rd Class, New South Wales Police Force.
- George Laing Smith, Superintendent 2nd Class, New South Wales Police Force.
- James Wiley, Superintendent 3rd Class, New South Wales Police Force.
- Gilbert Edward Leary, Superintendent 3rd Class, New South Wales Police Force.

Fire Service

- Edward James Griffiths, Chief Officer of Fire Brigades, New South Wales Fire Service.
- Gerald Patrick Condon, Deputy Chief Officer of Fire Brigades, New South Wales Fire Service.

Southern Rhodesia

- Captain Henry James Killick, British South Africa Police.

Colonies & Protectorates

- Edward John George Brown, CPM, Senior Superintendent of Police, Uganda.
- Cecil Penfold, CPM, Senior Superintendent of Police, Kenya.

=== Colonial Police Medal ===
Bechuanaland Protectorate

- Ratholo Noke, Sergeant, Bechuanaland Protectorate Police.

Southern Rhodesia

- William Howard, Chief Inspector, British South Africa Police.
- John Sebastian Young, Detective Chief Inspector, British South Africa Police.

Swaziland

- Makabane Bhembe, Warrant Officer, Class I, Swaziland Police.
- Captain Lindsay Paton Pretious, Superintendent, Swaziland Police.

Colonial Empire

- Jirdeh Ahamed, Sub-Inspector, British Somaliland Police Force.
- Arthur Lewin Alexander, Assistant Commissioner, Gold Coast Police Force.
- Leonard Nanco Alfonso, Inspector, St. Lucia Police Force.
- Peter Duncan Aphiri, Detective Inspector, Northern Rhodesia Police Force.
- Samuel Aphiri, Detective Inspector, Northern Rhodesia Police Force.
- Wilmot Sylvester Ashley, Assistant Superintendent, Jamaica Constabulary.
- Raymond Barnes, Constable, Fire Brigade, Antigua, Leeward Islands Police Force.
- Roseul Clarke Beckford, Inspector, Jamaica Constabulary.
- Stanhope Billyeald, Detective Superintendent, British Guiana Police Force.
- Edmond Joseph Blaize, Inspector, Leeward Islands Police Force.
- Captain Hugh Fitzherbert Bloxham, Honorary Assistant Superintendent, Auxiliary Police Federation of Malaya.
- Harris Lowell Bodden, Sergeant, Cayman Islands Constabulary.
- William Frederick Borg, Superintendent, Malta Police Force.
- Conrad Swire Kerr Bovell, Superintendent, Federation of Malaya Police Force.
- Charles Moore Breen, Assistant Superintendent, Northern Rhodesia Police Force.
- Edward Stanley Brooks, Inspector, Hong Kong Police Force.
- Samuel Birikorang Bimpong Buta, Inspector, Gold Coast Police Force.
- Raj Nath Caushica, Inspector, Uganda Police Force.
- Louis Evanoe Chasle, Sergeant, Mauritius Police Force.
- Richmond Chintoh, Chief Inspector, Gold Coast Police Force.
- Llewellyn Malcolm Clark, Inspector, Northern Rhodesia Police Force.
- Raymond Cole, Senior Assistant Superintendent, Sierra Leone Police Force.
- Richard Byrne Corridon, Assistant Superintendent, Singapore Police Force.
- Baba Damagaram, Sergeant-Major, Nigeria Police Force.
- Thomas Middleton Davidson, Superintendent, Northern Rhodesia Police Force.
- Donald Vernon Davis, Police Lieutenant, Federation of Malaya Police Force.
- Julian Canning Day, Superintendent, Northern Rhodesia Police Force.
- Joseph Albert Jupin de Fondaumiere, Superintendent, Mauritius Police Force.
- Mohamed Din bin Mohamed Shariff, Assistant Superintendent, Federation of Malaya Police Force.
- Haji Emran bin Haji Ahmad, Inspector, Federation of Malaya Police Force.
- John Edwin Fairbairn, Assistant Superintendent, Singapore Police Force.
- Stanley Marchmont Fortt, Senior Superintendent, Uganda Police Force.
- Clyde Wilfred Foster, Sergeant, St. Lucia Police Force.
- Ginsus bin Kaio, Sergeant, North Borneo Armed Constabulary.
- Goh Ah Pok, Special Grade Detective, Singapore Police Force.
- Joseph Benjamin Gooden, Sub-Inspector, Jamaica Constabulary.
- Adamu Grunshi, Sergeant-Major, Gold Coast Police Force.
- Neil Patrick Hadow, Commissioner, Mauritius Police Force.
- Edmund Ronald Harrison, Inspector, Jamaica Constabulary.
- Stephen Harry, Chief Inspector, Sarawak Constabulary.
- Frederick Charles Henley, Assistant Superintendent, Kenya Police Force.
- Lawson Augustine Hicks, Assistant Superintendent, Northern Rhodesia Police Force.
- William Joseph Guy Holland, Deputy Commissioner, Fiji Police Force.
- Hsu Feng Li, son of Hsu Tsi Ho, Staff-Sergeant, Hong Kong Police Force.
- Ibrahim Ikaramtulla, Sergeant, Kenya Police Force.
- Eric Clinton Johnson, Pay and Quartermaster, British Guiana Police Force.
- Lotimus Joseph, lately Inspector, Grenada Police Force.
- Yozefu Kasuja Kasaja, Inspector, Uganda Police Force.
- Abbas Khan, son of Ghulam Mohamed, Staff Sergeant, Hong Kong Police Force.
- Shamsher Khawas, Bandmaster, Nyasaland Police Force.
- Johnny Kumbo, Sergeant-Major, Nigeria Police Force.
- Lau Siew Foo, Detective Inspector, Singapore Police Force.
- Leong Boon Swee, Chief Inspector, Federation of Malaya Police Force.
- Michael John Macoun, Senior Superintendent, Tanganyika Police Force.
- Khwaja Abdulaziz Majid, Chief Inspector, Zanzibar Police Force.
- Francis Norman Miles, Superintendent, Jamaica Constabulary.
- Nolan Knighton Millett, Senior Superintendent, Nigeria Police Force.
- Charles Mottram, Assistant Superintendent, Hong Kong Police Force.
- Timbilla Mosm, Sergeant, Gold Coast Police Force.
- Anam Nyandianga, Senior Inspector, Kenya Police Force.
- Joachim Omile, Sergeant, Nigeria Police Force.
- Charles Stewart Panton, Assistant Superintendent, Jamaica Constabulary.
- Alexander Phillips, Police Lieutenant, Federation of Malaya Police Force.
- George Cuthbert Reed, MBE, Provincial Commandant, Kenya Police Reserve.
- William Robert Reeve, Assistant Superintendent, Gold Coast Police Force.
- Ferminus Olatokumbo Reis, Sub-Inspector, Nigeria Police Force.
- Edward Reginald John Richards, Assistant Superintendent, Federation of Malaya Police Force.
- Walter Venia Samuels, Inspector, Leeward Islands Police Force.
- Edward Albert Shaw, Chief Inspector, Kenya Police Force.
- Kitukp Siengo, Assistant 'Inspector, Kenya Police Force.
- Harbans Singh, Inspector, Kenya Police Force.
- Jiwan Singh, son of Paal Singh, Sergeant, Hong Kong Police Force.
- Mahain Singh, Sub-Inspector, Federation of Malaya Police Force.
- Geoffrey Ernest Frederick Southey, Assistant Superintendent, Federation of Malaya Police Force.
- Henry Donald Stevenson, Assistant Superintendent, Kenya Police Force.
- Charles Hugh Kent Strike, Superintendent, Gold Coast Police Force.
- William George Syer, Senior Superintendent, Nigeria Police Force.
- Tan Ghim Kheng, Inspector, Federation of Malaya Police Force.
- Ibrahim Hakki Tayyar, Inspector, Cyprus Police Force.
- John Dick Thomson, Senior Assistant Superintendent, Uganda Police Force.
- Tsui Po Ying, Inspector, Hong Kong Police Force.
- Roy Vincent Francis Turner, Assistant Superintendent, Hong Kong Police Force.
- Wan bin Sheikh Abdul Rahman, Assistant Superintendent, Federation of Malaya Police Force.
- Trevor Alfred Wright, Inspector, Northern Rhodesia Police Force.
- Yeop Mahideen bin Muhamed Shariff, MBE, Honorary Assistant Superintendent, Auxiliary Police, Federation of Malaya.
- Yubong bin Sadipan, Sergeant-Major, North Borneo Armed Constabulary.
- Ibrahim Yusuf, lately Inspector, British Somaliland Police Force.

== Australia ==
=== Knight Bachelor ===
- John Robert Kemp, MICE MIEA. For public services.
- Thomas Malcolm Ritchie, MIEA. For political and public services.
- John Smith Teasdale, CBE, Chairman of the Australian Wheat Board.

=== Order of the Bath ===
==== Companion of the Order of the Bath (CB) ====
Military Division

Royal Australian Air Force

- Air Vice-Marshal John Patrick Joseph McCauley, CBE.

=== Order of Saint Michael and Saint George ===
==== Knight Commander of the Order of St Michael and St George (KCMG) ====
- The Right Honourable Arthur William Fadden, MP, Deputy Prime Minister and Federal Treasurer.

==== Companion of the Order of St Michael and St George (CMG) ====
- Lieutenant-Colonel William Roy Hodgson, OBE, an Australian diplomat, at present British Commonwealth representative on the Allied Control Council for Japan.
- Dudley Charles Turner, FCIS. For service to the Australian Red Cross and hospitals.

=== Order of the British Empire ===
==== Dame Commander of the Order of the British Empire (DBE) ====
Civil Division

- Mary Dora Daly, CBE. For outstanding service to social welfare.

==== Commander of the Order of the British Empire (CBE) ====
Military Division

Royal Australian Navy

- Captain (Commodore Second Class) John Malet Armstrong, DSO.

Army

- Brigadier Thomas Neil Gooch (5/1), Australian Military Forces.

Royal Australian Air Force

- Air Vice-Marshal Ellis Charles Wackett, OBE.

Civil Division

- Raymond Spencer Goward, MBE FCA, formerly Chief Commissioner of the Australian Comforts Fund.
- Douglas Frank Hewson Packer, Managing Director of Consolidated Press Ltd., and lately President of the Australian Newspapers Council.
- George Percival Norman Watt, Chairman of the Australian National Airlines Commission.

==== Officer of the Order of the British Empire (OBE) ====
Military Division

Royal Australian Navy

- Sheila Mary Kenworthy, Women's Royal Australian Naval Service Reserve, Lately Director, Women's Royal Australian Naval Service.
- Acting Captain Alvord Sydney Rosenthal, DSO.

Army

- Lieutenant-Colonel Jack Neville Lucas Argent, ED (2/107364), Commonwealth Military Forces.
- Major Alfred Robert Etheredge (3/142), Australian Military Forces.

Royal Australian Air Force

- Group Captain Henry George Acton.
- Wing Commander Norman Ford, AFC (0339).

Civil Division

- The Reverend Clarence Irving Benson, DD, Superintendent of the Wesley Church Central Mission, Melbourne, and a prominent ecclesiastic.
- James Gordon Hardman, Principal Registrar of the High Court.
- Rita May Harris. For social welfare services, especially on behalf of children.
- Herbert Wilmot Heskett. For services to electrical engineering.
- Charles Norman McKenzie, FRSA. For social welfare services.
- Charles Wheeler, DCM. For services to Art.

==== Member of the Order of the British Empire (MBE) ====
Military Division

Royal Australian Navy

- Lieutenant (L) Harry Reginald Giles.
- Leonard Douglas Martyn Roberts, VRD, Senior Commissioned Boatswain, Royal Australian Naval Reserve.
- Acting Ordnance Lieutenant-Commander Thomas Rupert Venus.

Army

- Captain Alfred John Barnett, BEM (6/18), Australian Military Forces.
- Captain Joseph Ross Fletcher (5/20872), Commonwealth Military Forces.
- Captain Thomas Erlsford Hayes (1/39), Australian Military Forces.
- Captain (Honorary Major) Henry Walter Samuel Jackson, ED (3/40046), Australian Military Forces.
- Captain Andrew John Gibb Maitland (4/30552), Commonwealth Military Forces.
- Captain David Ashley Williams (2/61514), Commonwealth Military Forces.

Royal Australian Air Force

- Squadron Leader John Mann (03537).
- Acting Squadron Leader Sydney James Barrow (033035).
- Flight Lieutenant William James Ryan (03495).
- Flight Lieutenant Oliver Studley (03543).

Civil Division

- Bethia Kilgour. For social welfare services.
- Robert Douglas Leitch. For public services.
- Septimus Lillywhite. For services to munitions production.
- Roberta Sinclair Reid. For services in connection with the training of blind children.
- Joseph Gordon Robinson, Lay Canon of St Paul's Cathedral, Melbourne.
- Ernest James Taylor. For services to Journalism.
- Dudley Ackerley Tregent. For services to ex-service men.

=== British Empire Medal (BEM) ===
Military Division

Royal Australian Navy

- Chief Shipwright Fernley Thomas Barron (10892).
- Able Seaman John Francis McMahon (30760).

Army

- No. 2/46894 Staff-Sergeant Arthur Bernard Bentley, Australian Military Forces.
- No. 3/1818 Sergeant Sydney James Mills, Australian Military Forces.
- No. 2/45484 Corporal Eric Edward Sarchfield, Australian Military Forces.
- No. 5/20737 Sergeant George Stewart, Commonwealth Military Forces.
- No. 4/259 Sergeant Hurtle Murdock Zilm, Commonwealth Military Forces.

Royal Australian Air Force

- Acting Flight Sergeant Michael Patrick Freeman (A.2171).

=== Air Force Cross (AFC) ===
Royal Australian Air Force

- Flight Lieutenant Jack Marshall Cairns (031473).
- Flight Lieutenant John Wilkins Hubble (05833).
- Warrant Officer Angus Arthur Swinbourn (A.5847).

==== Bar to Air Force Cross ====
- Squadron Leader Kenneth Victor Robertson, AFC (033013).

=== King's Commendation for Valuable Service in the Air ===
Royal Australian Air Force

- Flight Lieutenant Leslie George Christofis (011355).
- Flight Lieutenant Reginald John Emmerson (011328).

== Ceylon ==
=== Knight Bachelor ===
- Ukwatte Acharige Jayasundera, CBE KC, Senator.
- Razik Fareed, OBE, Senator.

=== Order of Saint Michael and Saint George ===
==== Companion of the Order of St Michael and St George (CMG) ====
- Ralph Henry Bassett, CBE, lately Permanent Secretary to the Ministry of Industries, Industrial Research and Fisheries.
- Henry William Howes, OBE PhD, Director of Education.

=== Order of the British Empire ===
==== Commander of the Order of the British Empire (CBE) ====
Civil Division

- Alice Elizabeth Kotelawala, MBE. For social work and services to rural development.
- Sidney Arnold Pakeman, OBE MC ED, Member of Parliament. Previously Professor of Modern History and Economics, Ceylon University College.

==== Officer of the Order of the British Empire (OBE) ====
Civil Division

- Nandasara Wijetilaka Atukorala, MBE, Secretary to the Prime Minister.
- Sooriyakumara Wannisinghe Punchi Bahda Bulankulame, MBE MP, Parliamentary Secretary to the Minister of Agriculture and Lands.
- Gerald Samuel William de Saram, LMS MB BS MRCS LRCP, lately Judicial Medical Officer, Colombo.
- Warusahennedige Leo Fernando, Member of Parliament for Buttala.
- Paul Alfred John Hernu, Chairman, Colombo Port Commission.
- Oswald Phillip Rust, Managing Director, Darley Butler & Co. Ltd. For services to the Tea Commissioner.

==== Member of the Order of the British Empire (MBE) ====
Military Division

- Captain (Quartermaster) Harold Erastue Pineo Vantwest, ED, Ceylon Volunteer Force.
- Captain (Quartermaster) Edward Charles Young, ED, 2nd (Volunteer) Coast Artillery Regiment, Ceylon Artillery.
- Regimental Sergeant-Major Rothschild Henry Salvador, 2nd (Volunteer) Battalion, Ceylon Light Infantry.

Civil Division

- John Arthur Amaratunge, Member, Gal Oya Development Board.
- Modestus Fernando Chandraratna, PhD, Botanist and Senior Agricultural Research Officer, Department of Agriculture.
- Rajakaruna Wanigasekara Mudiyariselage Ukku Banda Dedigama, Rate Mahatmaya (Chief Headman), Beligal Korale, Kegalle District.
- Dhanusekera Bandara Ellepola, Acting Director, Rural Development.
- Christogu Juan Fernandopulle. For public and social services in Chilaw District.
- Dunuwilagedera Haramanis Jayewickreme. For public and social services in Kandy.
- Roger Collin Kerr, Chairman, Toc H Club, Colombo.
- Abeyratne Cudah Leonard Ratwatte, Shroff, Mercantile Bank, Kandy.
- William Floris de Alwis Seneviratne. For public services in the Kalutara District.
- Samuel Muthuvaloe Tamby Raja. For public and social services in Matale District.
- Reginald Hugh Wickramasinghe, Controller of Establishments.
- John Wilson, Proctor of the Supreme Court.
- John Richard Wilson, MD BS MRCS LRCP, Visiting Physician, Tuberculosis Hospital, Welisara, and Consultant to the Chest Hospital, Ragama.

=== Companion of the Imperial Service Order (ISO) ===
Ceylon Civil Service

- James Ernest Victor Peiris, lately Headmaster, Royal College.
- Jayakariyawasange Aloysius Leon Perera Wijewardene, Drawing Office Assistant, Public Works Department.

=== King's Police and Fire Services Medal ===
- William Thomas Brindley, Deputy Inspector-General of Police.

== Pakistan ==
=== Order of the British Empire ===
==== Commander of the Order of the British Empire (CBE) ====
Military Division

- Group Captain (Acting Air Commodore) Douglas Lloyd Amlot, DFC AFC, Royal Air Force.

==== Officer of the Order of the British Empire (OBE) ====
Military Division

- Major (War Substantive) Robert Herbert Long, Special List (ex-Indian Army).
