= Ceylonese recipients of British titles =

Ceylonese recipients of British titles conferred on the advice of Her Majesty's Ceylon Ministers. This list includes all those who were born in, worked in or lived in Ceylon.

== 19th Century ==
=== 1890s ===
==== 1891 ====
Dignity of a wife of a Knight Bachelor

- 1892 - Catherine De Soysa, widow of Charles Henry de Soysa, JP

==== 1892 ====
Order of St Michael and St George

- Companion, (CMG)
  - 1892 - Peter Daniel Anthonisz,, an Unofficial Member of the Legislative Council of the Island of Ceylon.

==== 1897 ====
Order of St Michael and St George

- Knight Commander, (KCMG)
  - 1897 - Frederick Richard Saunders CMG, Treasurer of the Island of Ceylon.

== Twentieth century ==
=== 1900s ===
==== 1901 ====
Order of St Michael and St George

- Companion, (CMG)
  - 1901 - Francis Alfred Cooper, Esq., Director of Public Works of the Island of Ceylon
  - 1901 - Charles Edward Ducat Pennycuick, Esq., on retirement as Treasurer of the Island of Ceylon

Privy Council

- 1901 - Sir John Winfield Bonser, Chief Justice of the Supreme Court, Ceylon

Knight Bachelor

- 1901 - Archibald Campbell Lawrie, Esq., on retirement as Senior Puisne Justice of the Supreme Court, Ceylon

==== 1902 ====
Order of St Michael and St George

- Companion, (CMG)
  - 1902 - Lieutenant-Colonel Arthur Craigie FitzHardinge Vincent, Commandant of Volunteers in the Island of Ceylon.

==== 1903 ====
Order of St Michael and St George

- Companion, (CMG)
  - 1903 - Herbert Wace, Esq., Government Agent of the Central Province of the Island of Ceylon.

==== 1906 ====
Order of St Michael and St George

- Companion, (CMG)
  - 1906 - Henry Leighton Crawford, Esq., Government Agent, Southern Province, Island of Ceylon.

==== 1908 ====
Order of St Michael and St George

- Companion, (CMG)
  - 1908 - Philip David Warren, Esq., Surveyor-General of the Island of Ceylon.

==== 1909 ====
Order of St Michael and St George

- Knight Commander, (KCMG)
  - 1909 - Hugh Charles Clifford, Esq., C.M.G., Colonial Secretary of the Island of Ceylon.

=== 1910s ===
==== 1911 ====
Order of St Michael and St George

- Companion, (CMG)
  - 1911 - John Penry Lewis, Esq., M.A., late Government Agent for the Central Province of the Island of Ceylon.

==== 1913 ====
Order of St Michael and St George

- Companion, (CMG)
  - 1913 - John George Fraser, Esq., Acting Government Agent, Western Province, Island of Ceylon.
  - 1913 - Leonard William Booth, Esq., Acting Colonial Secretary of the Island of Ceylon.

==== 1914 ====
Order of St Michael and St George

- Companion, (CMG)
  - 1914 - William Henry Jackson, Esq., lately Controller of Revenue of the Island of Ceylon.
  - 1914 - Reginald Edward Stubbs, Esq., Colonial Secretary of the Island of Ceylon.

==== 1916 ====
Order of St Michael and St George

- Companion, (CMG)
  - 1916 - Bernard Senior, Esq., I.S.O., Treasurer of the Island of Ceylon.

==== 1919 ====
Order of the British Empire

- Commander, (CBE)
  - Civil Division
    - 1919 - Henry Lawson De Mel, Industrialist and Philanthropist.

=== 1920s ===
==== 1920 ====
King's Police Medal (KPM)

- 1920 - Herbert Layard Dowbiggin, Inspector-General of Police, Ceylon.

==== 1922 ====
Order of St Michael and St George

- Companion, (CMG)
  - 1922 - Robert Bailey Hellings, Government Agent, Southern Province, Island of Ceylon.

==== 1923 ====
Knight Bachelor

- 1923 - Sir Hilarion Marcus Fernando, MD, Member of the Executive Council of Ceylon and Nominated Unofficial Member of the Legislative Council of Ceylon.

Order of the British Empire

- Commander, (CBE)
  - Civil Division
    - 1923 - Honorary Colonel Edward James Hayward, VD, formerly Officer Commanding Ceylon Garrison Artillery.
  Officer, (OBE)
  - Civil Division
    - 1923 - Edwin Evans, Assistant Director of Education, Ceylon, in recognition of his services to Education.
  Member, (MBE)
  - Civil Division
    - 1923 - Nevins Selvadurai, Principal of the Jaffna Hindu College, Jaffna, Ceylon, in recognition of his services to Education.
    - 1923 - Sinnatamby Welayden, Chief Inspector, Vernacular Schools, Ceylon, in recognition of his services to Education.

==== 1925 ====
Order of the British Empire

- Knight Commander, (KBE)
  - Civil Division
    - 1925 - Sir James Peiris, JP, Vice-President of the Legislative Council of Ceylon.

==== 1929 ====
Order of the British Empire

- Commander, (CBE)
  - Civil Division
    - 1929 - Thomas Edward Dutton, General Manager, Government Railway, Ceylon.
  Officer, (OBE)
  - Civil Division
    - 1929 - Louis Edmund Blaze, Founder and principal of Kingswood College, Kandy, in recognition of his services to Education.
  Member, (MBE)
  - Civil Division
    - 1929 - Pattinihennedige Warnadipthia Kurukulasuriya Selestina Rodrigo Dias, for charitable services in Ceylon.
    - 1929 - Evelyn Storrs Karney. For child welfare work in the North Central Province of Ceylon.

=== 1930s ===
==== 1931 ====
Knight Bachelor

- 1931 - Chevalier Sir Henry Lawson De Mel, CBE, Member of the Legislative Council of Ceylon, public and philanthropic services in Ceylon.

==== 1932 ====
Knight Bachelor

- 1932 - Sir Thomas Martland Ainscough, CBE, His Majesty's Senior Trade Commissioner in India and Ceylon.

Order of St Michael and St George

- Companion, (CMG)
  - 1932 - Major John William Oldfield, OBE, Nominated Member of the State Council, Island of Ceylon. For public services.

Order of the British Empire

- Officer, (OBE)
  - Civil Division
    - 1932 - Seemampillai Francis Chellappah, Senior Medical Officer of Health, Ceylon.
  Member, (MBE)
  - Civil Division
    - 1932 - Cissy Cooray. For social welfare services in Ceylon.
    - 1932 - Peter De Abrew. For services to education in Ceylon.

Imperial Service Order

- Companion, (ISO)
  - 1932 - Lionel Bastiampillai Emmanuel, Office Assistant to the Director of Public Works, Ceylon.

==== 1935 ====
Knight Bachelor

- 1935 - Sir Thomas Forrest Garvin, Esq., lately Senior Puisne Judge, Ceylon

==== 1936 ====
Order of St Michael and St George

- Companion, (CMG)
  - 1936 - Harold James Huxham, Colonial Administrative Service, Financial Secretary, Ceylon.

Order of the British Empire

- Commander, (CBE)
  - Military Division
    - 1936 - Lieutenant-Colonel Percy John Parsons, ED, Officer Commanding Ceylon Garrison Artillery, Ceylon Defence Force.
  Officer, (OBE)
  - Civil Division
    - 1936 - Ernest Wilfred Head, lately General Manager of the Government Railway, Ceylon.
    - 1936 - William Johnson Thornhill, MInstCE, lately Director of Public Works, Ceylon.
  Member, (MBE)
  - Civil Division
    - 1936 - Hilda Fowke, DSc. For social services in Ceylon.
    - 1936 - Gerald Percival Keuneman. For public services in Ceylon.

==== 1938 ====
Knight Bachelor

- 1938 - Sir Mohamed Macan Markar. For public services in Ceylon.

Order of St Michael and St George

- Companion, (CMG)
  - 1938 - Ralph Marcus Meaburn Worsley, MC, Colonial Administrative Service, Officer of Class I, Ceylon Civil Service.

Order of the British Empire

- Officer, (OBE)
  - Military Division
    - 1938 - Lieutenant-Colonel Waldo Sansoni, VD, Officer Commanding, Ceylon Light Infantry.
    Civil Division
    - 1938 - Isabella Hardie Curr, MBE LRCP LRCS, in charge of the McLeod Hospital for Women at Inuvil, near Jaffna, Ceylon.
    - 1938 - Allan Morley Spaar, Relief Works Officer, Ceylon.
  Member, (MBE)
  - Military Division
    - 1938 - Warrant Officer, Class II (Regimental Quarter Master-Sergeant) Harold Collingwood Bayne, Ceylon Army Service Corps.
    - 1938 - Warrant Officer, Class I (Regimental Sergeant Major) George Noah David, Ceylon Medical Corps.

Kaisar-i-Hind Medal

- 1938 - The Reverend John Stirling Morley Hooper, General Secretary of the Bible Society for India & Ceylon, Central Provinces & Berar.

==== 1939 ====
Order of St Michael and St George

- Companion, (CMG)
  - 1939 - Guy Stanley Wodeman, Colonial Administrative Service, Deputy Chief Secretary, Ceylon.

Order of the British Empire

- Commander, (CBE)
  - Military Division
    - 1939 - Arthur Marcelles de Silva, FRCS LRCP, Senior Surgeon, General Hospital, Ceylon.
  Officer, (OBE)
  - Civil Division
    - 1939 - Ammembal Vittal Pai, Indian Civil Service, Agent of the Government of India in Ceylon.
    - 1939 - Abraham Christopher Gregory Suriarachchi Amarasekara. For services to art in Ceylon.
  Member, (MBE)
  - Military Division
    - 1939 - Lieutenant Henry Melville Cadman, Ceylon Planters Rifle Corps, Ceylon Defence Force.
    - 1939 - Alice Elisabeth Kotalawala. For social services in Ceylon.
    - 1939 - Ramanathar Sivagnanam. For public services in Ceylon.

Imperial Service Order

- Companion, (ISO)
  - 1939 - Charles Vincent Gooneratne, Assistant Superintendent of Police, Ceylon.
  - 1939 - Joachim Joseph Jacob, Deputy Auditor General, Ceylon.
  - 1939 - Amnachalam Visvanadhan, Extra Office Assistant, Ceylon Civil Service.

Colonial Police Medal

- 1939 - Habaragamuwage Thomas Peiris, Sergeant of Police, Ceylon.

=== 1940s ===
==== 1941 ====
Order of St Michael and St George

- Knight Grand Cross, (GCMG)
  - 1941 - Sir Andrew Caldecott, KCMG CBE, Governor and Commander-in-Chief of the Island of Ceylon.
  Companion, (CMG)
  - 1941 - Charles Henry Collins, Colonial Administrative Service, Deputy Chief Secretary, Ceylon.

Order of the British Empire

- Officer, (OBE)
  - Civil Division
    - 1941 - Cissie Cooray, MBE, for social services in Ceylon.
  Member, (MBE)
  - Civil Division
    - 1941 - Duraiappa Rajaratnam. For social services in Ceylon.

Imperial Service Order

- Companion, (ISO)
  - 1941 - William Theodore Loos, Office Assistant to the Chief Secretary, Ceylon.
  - 1941 - Mudaliyar Sinattampi Vallipuram, Assistant Settlement Officer, Ceylon.

==== 1942 ====
Order of St Michael and St George

- Companion, (CMG)
  - 1942 - Robert Harry Drayton, Colonial Legal Service, Chief Secretary, Ceylon.

Order of the British Empire

- Commander, (CBE)
  - Civil Division
  - 1942 - Lionel McDowall Robison, Colonial Education Service, Director of Education, Ceylon.

Order of the British Empire

- Officer, (OBE)
  - Military Division
  - 1942 - Lieutenant-Colonel John Victor Collins, ED, Ceylon Garrison Artillery.
    Civil Division
  - 1942 - James Mervyn Fonseka, Legal Draftsman, Ceylon.
  Member, (MBE)
  - Military Division
  - 1942 - Major Neil Schokman, ED, Ceylon Engineers.
    Civil Division
  - 1942 - Mary Olive Marjorie Carter, Principal, School for Deaf & Blind, Ceylon.
  - 1942 - The Reverend Clarence Ebenezer Victor Nathanielsz, Charity Commissioner, Public Assistance Department, Colombo Municipality, Ceylon.
  - 1942 - Donald Obeyesekere. For public services in Ceylon.

Imperial Service Order

- Companion, (ISO)
  - 1942 - Harold Pietersz William Melder, Office Assistant, Matale Kachcheri, Ceylon.
  - 1942 - James Cyril Wirekoon, Assistant Director of Education, Ceylon.

==== 1943 ====
Order of the British Empire

- Knight Commander, (KBE)
  - Civil Division
  - 1943 - Sir Don Baron Jayatilaka, M.A, Ceylon Government’s Representative in India.
- Officer, (OBE)
  - Civil Division
  - 1943 - Sabapathipillai Rajanayagam, Superintending Telecommunication Engineer of the Post and Telegraph Department.
  - 1943 - Ralph Henry Bassett, C.C.S, Commissioner for the Development of Agricultural Marketing.
  Officer, (OBE)
  - Military Division
  - 1943 - Major John Oldknow Widdows, M.C, Sherwood Foresters.
  - 1943 - Major Ernest Lionel Mack, V.D, Ceylon Light Infantry

==== 1946 ====
Order of St Michael and St George

- Companion, (CMG)
  - 1946 - Paikiasothy Saravanamuttu, Ceylonese civil servant (Declined)

==== 1946 ====
Order of the British Empire

- Officer, (OBE)
  - 1947 - Richard Leslie Brohier, Assistant Surveyor General

==== 1948 ====
These were the first conferred under the Dominion of Ceylon

Order of the British Empire

- Officer, (OBE)
  - 1948 - Abdon Ignatius Perera, acting Postmaster General
  - 1948 - John Robert Blaze, Senior Physician, General Hospital, Colombo
  - 1948 - Abdul Raheman Abdul Razik - Senator, Member of the State Council.
  - 1948 - Gunasena de Soyza, Commissioner of Co-operative Development
  - 1948 - Sabapathy Somasundaram, Proctor of the Supreme Court
  - 1948 - Bertram Edmund Weerasinghe, Chief Officer Colombo Municipal Fire Brigade, Assistant Civil Defence Commissioner (Fire Services)

=== 1950s ===
==== 1950 ====
Order of the British Empire

- Member, (MBE)
  - 1950 - Lady Evelyn Johanna Publina de Soysa for social services

==== 1951 ====
Knight Bachelor

- 1951 - Sir Chittampalam Abraham Gardiner, Senator.
- 1951 - The Honourable Sir Edward George Perera Jayetileke, KC, Chief Justice of Ceylon.
- 1951 - Sir Ukwatte Acharige Jayasundera, CBE KC, Senator.
- 1951 - Sir Razik Fareed, OBE, Senator.

Order of St Michael and St George

- Companion, (CMG)
  - 1951 - Oswald Leslie De Kretser II. For public services. Lately Puisne Justice.
  - 1951 - Hethumuni Ayadoris De Silva, District Judge, Colombo.
  - 1951 - Ralph Henry Bassett, CBE, lately Permanent Secretary to the Ministry of Industries, Industrial Research and Fisheries.
  - 1951 - Henry William Howes, OBE PhD, Director of Education.

Order of the British Empire

- Commander, (CBE)
  - Military Division
    - 1951 - Brigadier the Right Honourable James Roderick, Earl of Caithness, DSO, Commander-in-Chief, Ceylon Army.
    Civil Division
    - 1951 - J. N. Arumugam, Permanent Secretary, Ministry of Transport and Works.
    - 1951 - Abdon Ignatius Perera, OBE, Postmaster General and Director of Telecommunications.
    - 1951 - Alice Elizabeth Kotelawala, MBE. For social work and services to rural development.
    - 1951 - Sidney Arnold Pakeman, OBE MC ED, Member of Parliament. Previously Professor of Modern History and Economics, Ceylon University College.
  Officer, (OBE)
  - Civil Division
    - 1951 - Suriyakumara Nichinga Senathiraja Ambalavaner Naganather Thandigai Canaganayagam, JP, Head Shroff, National Bank of India, Ltd., Kandy.
    - 1951 - Don Sam De Simon, LMS LRCP&S LRFP&S, Medical Superintendent, Leprosy Hospital, Hendala.
    - 1951 - David Shillingford Paynter. For public and social services.
    - 1951 - Conrad Boniface Peter Perera, Acting Settlement Officer, Land Settlement Department.
    - 1951 - Don William Rajapatirana, Commissioner of Income Tax, Estate Duty and Stamps.
    - 1951 - Sinnatamby Subramaniam, LMS LRCP&S LRFP&S. For medical and social services.
    - 1951 - Nandasara Wijetilaka Atukorala, MBE, Secretary to the Prime Minister.
    - 1951 - Sooriyakumara Wannisinghe Punchi Bahda Bulankulame, MBE MP, Parliamentary Secretary to the Minister of Agriculture and Lands.
    - 1951 - Gerald Samuel William de Saram, LMS MB BS MRCS LRCP, lately Judicial Medical Officer, Colombo.
    - 1951 - Warusahennedige Leo Fernando, Member of Parliament for Buttala.
    - 1951 - Paul Alfred John Hernu, Chairman, Colombo Port Commission.
    - 1951 - Oswald Phillip Rust, Managing Director, Darley Butler & Co. Ltd. For services to the Tea Commissioner.
  Member, (MBE)
  - Military Division
    - 1951 - Major Terence Richard Jansen, ED LMS LRCP&S LRFP&S, Ceylon Medical Corps.
    - 1951 - Captain (Quartermaster) Harold Erastue Pineo Vantwest, ED, Ceylon Volunteer Force.
    - 1951 - Captain (Quartermaster) Edward Charles Young, ED, 2nd (Volunteer) Coast Artillery Regiment, Ceylon Artillery.
    - 1951 - Regimental Sergeant-Major Rothschild Henry Salvador, 2nd (Volunteer) Battalion, Ceylon Light Infantry.
    Civil Division
    - 1951 - Dinshah Pherojshah Bilimoria. For public services.
    - 1951 - Somadeva Casinathan, lately Rubber Commissioner and Rubber Controller.
    - 1951 - Mandawalagama Appuhamelage Gunasekera. For public and social services.
    - 1951 - Mohamed Ismail, Serjeant-at-Arms, House of Representatives.
    - 1951 - Thanahandi David Mendis. For services to transport.
    - 1951 - Ahamado Casim Mohammado, JP, Proctor and Notary, Colombo.
    - 1951 - Swaminathar Patanjali. For public services in Jaffna.
    - 1951 - Aruwala Jotige Simon Perera. For public and charitable services.
    - 1951 - Victor Garvin Weerawardena Ratnayake, Member of Parliament for Deniyaya.
    - 1951 - Abdul Rahaman Mohamed Thassim. For public services in Galle.
    - 1951 - Joseph Nicholas Cecil Tiruchelvam, JP, City Coroner.
    - 1951 - Oliver Weerasinghe, FRIBA, Government Town Planner.
    - 1951 - John Arthur Amaratunge, Member, Gal Oya Development Board.
    - 1951 - Modestus Fernando Chandraratna, PhD, Botanist and Senior Agricultural Research Officer, Department of Agriculture.
    - 1951 - Rajakaruna Wanigasekara Mudiyariselage Ukku Banda Dedigama, Rate Mahatmaya (Chief Headman), Beligal Korale, Kegalle District.
    - 1951 - Dhanusekera Bandara Ellepola, Acting Director, Rural Development.
    - 1951 - Christogu Juan Fernandopulle. For public and social services in Chilaw District.
    - 1951 - Dunuwilagedera Haramanis Jayewickreme. For public and social services in Kandy.
    - 1951 - Roger Collin Kerr, Chairman, Toc H Club, Colombo.
    - 1951 - Abeyratne Cudah Leonard Ratwatte, Shroff, Mercantile Bank, Kandy.
    - 1951 - William Floris de Alwis Seneviratne. For public services in the Kalutara District.
    - 1951 - Samuel Muthuvaloe Tamby Raja. For public and social services in Matale District.
    - 1951 - Reginald Hugh Wickramasinghe, Controller of Establishments.
    - 1951 - John Wilson, Proctor of the Supreme Court.
    - 1951 - John Richard Wilson, MD BS MRCS LRCP, Visiting Physician, Tuberculosis Hospital, Welisara, and Consultant to the Chest Hospital, Ragama.

Imperial Service Order

- Companion, (ISO)
  - 1951 - James Ernest Victor Peiris, lately Headmaster, Royal College.
  - 1951 - Jayakariyawasange Aloysius Leon Perera Wijewardene, Drawing Office Assistant, Public Works Department.

King's Police and Fire Services Medal

- 1951 - William Thomas Brindley, Deputy Inspector-General of Police.

==== 1952 ====
These were the last conferred under King George VI's reign as King of Ceylon, as he died on 6 February 1952.

Knight Bachelor

- 1952 - Sir V. Coomaraswamy CMG, Deputy High Commissioner for Ceylon in the United Kingdom.
- 1952 - Sir Lalitha Abhaya Rajapakse KC, Minister of Justice.
- 1952 - Sir Paules Edward Pieris Deraniyagala, CMG. For social services in Colombo.

Order of St Michael and St George

- Companion, (CMG)
  - 1952 - Edward Frederick Noel Gratiaen KC, Puisne Judge of the Supreme Court of Ceylon.
  - 1952 - William Arthur Edward Karunaratne OBE, Professor of Pathology, University of Ceylon.

These were the first conferred under Queen Elizabeth II's reign as Queen of Ceylon (1952–1972).

Order of the British Empire

- Knight Commander, (KBE)
  - Civil Division
    - 1952 - Sir George Claude Stanley Corea, Ambassador for Ceylon in the United States of America.
- Commander, (CBE)
  - Civil Division
    - 1952 - James Aubrey Martensz, High Commissioner for Ceylon in Australia.
    - 1952 - Kenneth Morford, Manager, Mount Vernon Estate, Kotagala. For services to the tea industry.
    - 1952 - Senarath Paranavithana OBE, Archaeological Commissioner.
    - 1952 - David Frederick Ewen. For public and commercial services.
    - 1952 - Raja Hewavitarne, OBE, Minister of Labour, Industry and Commerce.
    - 1952 - Edward Wilmot Kannangara, OBE, lately Permanent Secretary, Ministry of Health and Local Government.
  Officer, (OBE)
  - Civil Division
    - 1952 - Kurbanhusen Adamaly. For public and commercial services.
    - 1952 - Oliver Gerard D'Alwis. For social services in Kalutara.
    - 1952 - Egodage Richard De Silva, Principal, Richmond College, Galle.
    - 1952 - Warusahennedige Daniel Fernando MBE. For charitable and commercial services.
    - 1952 - Martin Arthur Wimala Goonesekera, lately Proctor of the Supreme Court.
    - 1952 - Hugh Theodore Rosslyn Koch MP. For services to the export trade.
    - 1952 - Senaipathige Theobald Philip Rodrigo, Senator. For social services in Colombo.
    - 1952 - Victor Emmanuel Perera Seneviratne, visiting Physician, General Hospital, Colombo.
    - 1952 - Rajakaruna Ekanayake Wasala Mudiyanse Ralahamilage Ukku Banda Unamboowe. For agricultural services in Kotmale.
    - 1952 - Lloyd Oscar Abeyaratne, MRCP, LMS, Medical Officer, Hospital for Women and Children, Colombo.
    - 1952 - Edmund Joseph Cooray, Commissioner of Co-operative Development.
    - 1952 - Elizabeth Eleanor de Zoysa Gunetilleke Rajapakse Gunasekera, MBE. For social services.
    - 1952 - Mahapitiyage Velin Peter Peiris, LRCP, FRCS, Visiting Surgeon, General Hospital, Colombo.
    - 1952 - Herman Eric Peries, MBE, Acting Deputy Secretary, Treasury.
  Member, (MBE)
  - Military Division
    - 1952 - Major Harold Bracher, Royal Army Ordnance Corps.
    Civil Division
    - 1952 - Mannamarakkalage Venentius Edward Peter Cooray, Chairman of the Town Council, Wadduwa.
    - 1952 - Allan Bertram Demmer, Operating Superintendent, Ceylon Government Railway.
    - 1952 - Meerakuddy Mohamed Ebrahim MP. For public service in Pottuvil
    - 1952 - Wilfred Gunasekera, Proctor, Matara.
    - 1952 - Don Johannes Kumarage, Principal, Rahula College, Matara.
    - 1952 - Lionel William Ratuwatte Kuruppu. Chairman, Panadura and Talpiti Baddas Village Committee.
    - 1952 - Segu Ismail Lebbe Marikar Abdul Caflfoor Marikar-Hadjiar. For social service in Kalutara.
    - 1952 - Bamunuaracihdhige Don Rampala, Chief Mechanical Engineer, Ceylon Government Railway.
    - 1952 - Margaret Jane Rhind Reid. For social services.
    - 1952 - V. Veerasingam, lately Principal, Manipay Hindu College, Manipay.
    - 1952 - Ramalingam Sivagurunather, Proctor & Notary, Jaffna.
    - 1952 - Elsie Ethel Winifred Solomons, District Inspector of Schools, Western Province.
    - 1952 - Robert Oolhagasagaram Buell, President, Association of YMCA. Secretaries of India, Pakistan and Ceylon.
    - 1952 - Edmund Frederick Lorensz de Silva, Proctor of the Supreme Court. For social services in Kandy.
    - 1952 - Justin Aelian Fernando, LMS, Medical Practitioner, Colombo.
    - 1952 - Gladwin Conrad Hermon Kotalawela, Member of the Urban Council, Badulla. For social services in Uva Province.
    - 1952 - Edley Winston Mathew, Member of the House of Representatives for Balangoda.
    - 1952 - Juanyidanrallage Don Paulus Perera, Principal, Lorenz College, Colombo.
    - 1952 - Vairavanathar Ponnambalam, For services to the co-operative movement in Jaffna.
    - 1952 - David Wanigasekere. For social services in Matara.

Imperial Service Order

- Companion, (ISO)
  - 1952 - Maurice Leonard Classz, Salt Superintendent, Industries Department.

King's Police and Fire Services Medal for Distinguished Service

- 1952 - Erroll Alexander Koelmeyer MBE, Superintendent of Police, Criminal Investigation Department.

==== 1953 ====
Order of St Michael and St George

- Companion, (CMG)
  - 1953 - Ralph Norman Bond, Esq., O.B.E., Permanent Secretary, Ministry of Posts and Information.

Order of the British Empire

- Knight Commander, (KBE)
  - Civil Division
    - 1953 - His Excellency Sir Edwin Aloysius Perera Wijeyeratne, High Commissioner for Ceylon in the United Kingdom.
- Commander, (CBE)
  - Civil Division
    - 1953 - Warusahennedige Leo Fernando, Esq., O.B.E.. Member of Parliament for Buttala.
    - 1953 - Warusahennedige Abraham Bastian Bennet Soysa, Esq., M.B.E., Senator.
- Officer, (OBE)
  - Civil Division
    - 1953 - Simon Reginald Gunewardene, Esq., M.R.C.S., L.R.C.P., Medical Superintendent, State Home for the Aged, Koggala.
    - 1953 - Markandu Kanagasabay, Esq., General Manager, Ceylon Government Railway.
    - 1953 - Edwin Mendis Karunaratne, Esq., Proctor. For social services in Galle district.
    - 1953 - Sangarapully Sellamuttu, Esq., Member, Colombo Municipal Council.
    - 1953 - Sabapathipillai Albert Selvanayagam, Esq., M.B.E., Member, Batticaloa Urban Council.
    - 1953 - Charles Francis Whitaker, Esq., lately Secretary, Chamber of Commerce.
    - 1953 - Chandradasa Wijesinghe, Esq., Planter. For social services in the Southern Province.
    - 1953 - Basil Henry William, Esq., Managing Director, High Level Road Bus Company Limited.
- Member, (MBE)
  - Military Division
    - 1953 - Lieutenant-Commander (S) Kenneth Maitand Martinus; Royal Ceylon Navy.
    - 1953 - Major Roy Douglas Jayetileke, Ceylon Army.
    Civil Division
    - 1953 - Ella Marjorie, Mrs. Atkinson. For services to the encouragement of dancing.
    - 1953 - A. Arulpiragasam, Esq., Registrar-General.
    - 1953 - Lucien Noel Bartholomeusz, Esq., F.R.C.S., Visiting Surgeon, General Hospital, Colombo.
    - 1953 - Al'Haj Mohamed Purvis Drahaman, Esq., Medical Practitioner. For services to the Malay Community.
    - 1953 - Peter Frederick Alwis 'Goonetileka, Esq., Proctor. For services to the Co-operative Movement.
    - 1953 - Sago Sudhira Jayawickrama, Esq. For services to cricket.
    - 1953 - Don Wilfred Richard Kahawita, Esq., Designs Engineer in Charge, Designs and Research Sections, Irrigation Department.
    - 1953 - Wimala Irene, Mrs. Kannangara, District Representative, Kegalla District, Lanka Malhila Samiti Movement.
    - 1953 - George Keyt, Esq., Artist.
    - 1953 - Vitarana Simon Nanayakkara, Esq., Assistant Municipal Treasurer, Colombo, Municipal Council.
    - 1953 - Edward Ashley Peries, Esq., Crown Proctor, Kegalla.
    - 1953 - Wasala Bandaranayake Herat Mudiyanse Ralahamillage Tikiri Banda Poholiyadde, Esq., Member of Parliament for Horowupotana.
    - 1953 - A. B. Rajendra, Esq., Senator.
    - 1953 - M. Srikantha, Esq., Director, Land Development Department.

==== 1954 ====
Viscount

- 1954 - The Right Honourable Herwald, Baron Soulbury, GCMG, GCVO, OBE, MC, Governor-General of Ceylon.

Knight Bachelor

- 1954 - Sir Warusahennedige Abraham Bastian Bennet Soysa, Esq., CBE, Senator. For social services.

Order of St Michael and St George

- Companion, (CMG)
  - 1954 - Gunasena de Soyza, OBE, Permanent Secretary, Ministry of Defence and External Affairs.

Order of the British Empire

- Knight Commander, (KBE)
  - Civil Division
    - 1954 - The Honourable Kalutaravedage Deepal Sir Susantha de Fonseka, Statesmen and Ambassador.
    - 1954 - The Honourable Sir Pattiya Pathirannahalage Albert Frederick Peries, Speaker of the House of Representatives.
- Commander, (CBE)
  - Civil Division
    - 1954 - Alexander Nicholas D'Albrew Abeyesinghe, MBE, Member of Parliament for Negombo. For services to the Co-operative Movement.
    - 1954 - Ernest Peter Arnold Fernando. For social services.
    - 1954 - Paul Alfred John Hernu, OBE, Chairman, Colombo Port Commission.
    - 1954 - H. de Z. Siriwardena, Parliamentary Secretary, Ministry of Home Affairs.
  Officer, (OBE)
  - Military Division
    - 1954 - Lieutenant-Colonel Herbert Clifford Serasinghe, ED, Ceylon Army Medical Corps.
    Civil Division
    - 1954 - A. Arulpiragasam, MBE, Government Agent, North Western Province.
    - 1954 - Homi Framjee Billimoria, MBE, Chief Architect, Public Works Department.
    - 1954 - Jayasuriya Aratchige Edward Mathew de Saram, MBE. For social services.
    - 1954 - Santiago Wilson de Silva, MBE, Deputy Inspector General of Police.
    - 1954 - James Lamb, Director, Tea Research Institute of Ceylon.
    - 1954 - Pararajasingam Nadesan, Director of Civil Aviation and Additional Secretary to the Prime Minister.
    - 1954 - Hanwedige Henry Oliver Waitson Peiris. For services to Commerce.
    - 1954 - John Marcus Senaveratna, MBE. For services to the study of the history of Ceylon.
    - 1954 - G. P. Tambayah, Government Agent, Western Province.
  Member, (MBE)
  - Military Division
    - 1954 - Major Bertram Lucien Seneviratne, Ceylon Light Infantry.
    Civil Division
    - 1954 - Cyril Herbert Sooriaarachchi Amarasekera, Flying Instructor, Civil Aviation Department.
    - 1954 - Don Edmund Amarasekera, Chairman, Village Committee, Udugaha Pattu, Kalutara District.
    - 1954 - Leon Louis Attygalle, Municipal Treasurer, Colombo Municipality.
    - 1954 - Mohamed Falil Abdul Caffoor. For services to Commerce.
    - 1954 - Gerald Henry Cooray, MD, MRCS, Professor of Pathology, University of Ceylon.
    - 1954 - Neville Joseph Louis Jansz, Assistant Secretary, Ministry of Defence and External Affairs.
    - 1954 - Don Edward Victor Wanniarachchige Jayamanne, Actor and Producer.
    - 1954 - Don Timothy John Jayesinghe. For services to Commerce.
    - 1954 - Walatara Acharige David Silva Karunaratne. For charitable services.
    - 1954 - Nobel Irene Kiriella. For social services.
    - 1954 - G. H. P. Leembruggen, Assistant Superintendent of Police (Traffic).
    - 1954 - Salebhoy Husainbhoy Moosajee. For services to Commerce.
    - 1954 - Anton Wickremasinghe. For services to Commerce.
    - 1954 - Sarah Laurencina Wijesinghe. For charitable services.

British Empire Medal

- Civil Division
  - 1954 - Jayalath Yakkalamullage Ebert de Silva, Electrical Foreman, Department of Government Electrical Undertakings.
  - 1954 - Fitzroy Valentine Pinto Jayawardena, Acting Chief Welfare Officer, Ministry of Transport and Works.
  - 1954 - Murugupillai Navaratnasamy, Agricultural Instructor, Department of Agriculture.

==== 1955 ====
Knight Bachelor

- 1955 - The Honourable Warusahennedige Sir Leo Fernando, CBE. Member of Parliament for Buttala.
- 1955 - The Honourable Sir Cyril De Zoysa, President of the Senate.
- 1955 - Sir Ernest Peter Arnold Fernando, CBE. For public services.
- 1955 - Sir S. Pararajasingam. For services to Agriculture.

Order of St Michael and St George

- Knight Commander, (KCMG)
  - 1955 - Sir Arunachalam Mahadeva, Member, Public Service Commission.
  - 1955 - Sir Ukwatte Acharige Jayasundera, KBE, QC. For political and public services.
  - 1955 - The Honourable Sir Alan Edward Percival Rose, QC, Chief Justice.
- Companion, (CMG)
  - 1955 Nandasara Wijetilaka Atukorala, CBE, Secretary to the Governor-General.
  - 1955 Cyril Francis Fernando, OBE, MRCS, LRCP, Medical Officer and Physician, General Hospital, Colombo.
  - 1955 Pararajasingam Nadesan, OBE, Secretary to the Prime Minister.
  - 1955 Benjamin Franklin Perera, OBE, Permanent Secretary, Ministry of Home Affairs.
  - 1955 - Edmund Joseph Cooray, OBE, Chairman, Co-operative Wholesale Establishment.

Order of the British Empire

- Commander, (CBE)
  - Civil Division
    - 1955 - Mihidukulasuriya Guruge Joseph Michael De Livera. For social services in Negombo.
    - 1955 - Dhanusekera Bandara Ellepola, MBE. For public services.
    - 1955 - Thusew Samuel Fernando, QC, Solicitor-General.
    - 1955 - Suriyakumara Nichinga Senathiraja Ambalavaner Naganather Thandigai Canaganayagam, OBE. For public services.
    - 1955 - Victor Manuel De Mel. For services to Commerce.
    - 1955 - Adeline, Lady Molamure, OBE, Deputy President of the Senate.
  Officer, (OBE)
  - Military Division
    - 1955 - Commander Adalbert Vance Frugtniet, VRD, Royal Ceylon Volunteer Naval Force.
    - 1955 - Lieutenant Colonel Rasanayagam Sabanayagam, MBE, ED, Ceylon Cadet Corps.
    Civil Division
    - 1955 - Manikuwadumestrige Chandrasoma, Principal Collector of Customs, Colombo Port Commission.
    - 1955 - Weliwaittage Liveris Perera Dassanayake, LRCP&S, Superintendent, Filariasis Campaign.
    - 1955 - George Rajanayagam Handy, MD, MRCP, Visiting Physician, General Hospital, Colombo.
    - 1955 - Thomas David Jayasuriya, MBE, Director of Education.
    - 1955 - Kandiah Mahendra. For public services.
    - 1955 - Cecil Alexander Speldewinde, Commissioner of Income Tax, Estate Duty and Stamps.
    - 1955 - Joseph Nicholas Cecil Tiruchelvam, MBE, JP, City Coroner, Colombo.
    - 1955 - Joseph Salvadore Victoria, MVO. For services to Commerce.
    - 1955 - The Reverend James Cartman, Education Officer, Office of the Ceylon High Commissioner in London.
    - 1955 - Hewananarachchige Ivan Tiddy Dasanaike, Member of Parliament for Wariyapola. For political services.
    - 1955 - Theodore Alexander Dunuwille, Crown Advocate, Kandy.
    - 1955 - Douglas St. Clive Budd Janszé, Acting Solicitor-General.
    - 1955 - Nanayakkara Atulugamage Stephen de Silva Jayasinghe, Member of Parliament for Wellawatte-Galkissa. For political services.
    - 1955 - Ramachandran Alaghoopillai Nadesan. For public services.
    - 1955 - Kanahala Bandaralage Lawrence Perera. For services to Transport.
    - 1955 - M. Srikantha, MBE, Government Agent, Northern Province.
    - 1955 - Abdul Rahuman Mohamed Thassim, MBE. For public services in Galle.
  Member, (MBE)
  - Military Division
    - 1955 - Captain Alexander Joseph Zosimus Navaratne, Ceylon Army Medical Corps.
    - 1955 - Captain Weerasena Rajapakse, Ceylon Light Infantry.
    - 1955 - Captain Ceada Felix Fernando, Ceylon Artillery.
    - 1955 - Captain Weerawarnasuriya Patabendige Jinadasa Silva, Ceylon Army.
    Civil Division
    - 1955 - Thomas Frederick Blaze, JP, Crown Proctor, Badulla.
    - 1955 - Leslie Vernon Cooray, Secretary, Ceylon Savings Bank.
    - 1955 - Dalrymple Nandalochana Wickremaratne De Silva, Member, Colombo Municipal Council.
    - 1955 - Eardley Charles D'Silva, Secretary to the Leader of the House of Representatives, and Chief Government Whip.
    - 1955 - James Vethanayagam Feldano. For social services in Mannar.
    - 1955 - Somawira Gunasekera. For services to Sport.
    - 1955 - Lucien Arnold Gunesekera, Medical Practitioner, Colombo.
    - 1955 - Seiyadu Ibrahim Saibo Hameed. For public services in the North-West Province.
    - 1955 - Al-Haj Mohamed Ismail Mohamed Haniffa. For services to the Muslim community.
    - 1955 - Jiwatfam Towrmal Hirdaramani. For public services in Colombo.
    - 1955 - Mudhalithamby Mappanar Kulasekaram, Vice-Principal, Royal College, Colombo.
    - 1955 - Francis John Aloysius Ponrajah. For public services in Mannar.
    - 1955 - Avis Enid Raffel. For social services.
    - 1955 - Vithana Aratchige Sugathadasa, Member, Colombo Municipal Council.
    - 1955 - Arthur Van Langenberg, Secretary, Colombo Port Commission.
    - 1955 - Ethel De Kretser, Matron, Central Hospital.
    - 1955 - Walter Harris De Kretser. For services to Commerce.
    - 1955 - Talpe Gamage Bernard De Silva, Government Printer.
    - 1955 - Debramandadige Jason Fernando, Managing Director, Jason Fernando & Sons Ltd.
    - 1955 - Oliver Phoenix Charles Baden-Powell Forbes, Deputy Controller of Establishments, General Treasury.
    - 1955 - Jack McLennan Godefroy, Assistant Manager, Firestone (Ceylon) Ltd, Colombo.
    - 1955 - Maganlal Kuberdas Kapadia. For services to Commerce.
    - 1955 - Joachim Rosario Machado. For services to Commerce.
    - 1955 - Carthigasu Nadesan, Chief (Guarantee) Shroff, Indian Overseas Bank Ltd., Colombo.
    - 1955 - Sundaram Pathmanathan, Shroff, Imperial Bank of India Ltd., Colombo.
    - 1955 - Titus Walter Perera. For political services.
    - 1955 - Muthiahpillai Rajendram. For services to Commerce.
    - 1955 - Donald Jasen Ranaweera. For public services.
    - 1955 - David Robert Waller, Manager, Building & Construction Department, Walker Sons & Company Ltd., Colombo.
    - 1955 - Don Fredrick Wijenarayana. For public services in Galle.

Imperial Service Order

- Companion, (ISO)
  - 1955 - Edgar Alexander Van der Straaten, Shipping Master, Customs Department.

British Empire Medal

- Civil Division
  - 1955 - Henry Edward William De Zylva, Clerk, Governor-General's Office.
  - 1955 - Cornelius Walter Staniforth Gunawardana, Chief Clerk, Public Service Commission.
  - 1955 - Francis Samarasinghe, Chief Clerk, Prime Minister's Office.
  - 1955 - Francis Philip Rodrdgp Sathianathen, Stenographer, Prime Minister's Office.
  - 1955 - Malcolm Hugh Jayasekera, Sub-Inspector, Ceylon Police Force.
  - 1955 - Daniel Sepala Seneviratne Jayatilake, Officer-in-Charge, Police Central Garage.
  - 1955 - Vidane Aratchilage Peter Linus Jayawardena, Stenographer, Higher Grade, Department of the Prime Minister.
  - 1955 - Edmund Henry Vernon Joseph, Chief Clerk, Cabinet Office.

==== 1956 ====
Knight Bachelor

    - 1956 - Sir Ratnakirti Senarat Serasinghe Gunewardene, Her Majesty's Ambassador Extraordinary and Plenipotentiary of Ceylon in Washington.

Order of St Michael and St George

- Knight Commander of the Order of St Michael and St George (KCMG)
    - 1956 - Sir Arthur Marcelles de Silva, CBE, FRCS, LRCP, Member, Public Service Commission.

Order of the British Empire

- Officer, (OBE)
  - Civil Division
    - 1956 - Lady Evelyn Johanna Publina de Soysa for social services
    - 1956 - Dudley Atherton Wilson, until recently Chairman of the Board of Trustees of the Joseph Fraser Memorial Nursing Home, Colombo, Ceylon.

No further Ceylonese citizens were nominated for honours in the British Honours System after 1956, since S.W.R.D. Bandaranaikes government put an end to it.

== See also ==
- Sri Lankan honours system
