= James Richey =

James Richey may refer to:

- Sir James Bellett Richey (1834–1902), British administrator in Bombay Presidency
- James Alexander Richey (1874–1931), British educational administrator in South Africa and India
- James Ernest Richey (1886–1968), Irish-born geologist
