= 1890 Birthday Honours =

Appointments by Queen Victoria

The 1890 Birthday Honours were appointments by Queen Victoria to various orders and honours to reward and highlight good works by citizens of the British Empire. The appointments were made to celebrate the official birthday of The Queen, and were published in the London Gazette on 20 May 1890 and in The Times on 21 May 1890.

The recipients of honours are displayed here as they were styled before their new honour, and arranged by honour, with classes (Knight, Knight Grand Cross, etc.) and then divisions (Military, Civil, etc.) as appropriate.

== United Kingdom and British Empire ==
=== Privy Councillor ===
The Queen appointed the following to Her Majesty's Most Honourable Privy Council:

- Victor Villiers, Earl of Jersey, Paymaster-General.
- William Lawes Jackson MP Financial Secretary to the Treasury.

=== Baronetcies ===
- Sir Henry Wentworth Acland KCB Regius Professor of Medicine in the University of Oxford.
- Lt.-Col. William Wallace Hozier of Mauldslie.

=== Knight Bachelor ===
- William Arrol, of Seafield, Ayrshire, contractor for the Forth Bridge
- Robert Stickney Blaine, of Path.
- His Honour Judge Lloyd Reginald John Cust, Chief Commissioner of the West India Encumbered Estates Commission.
- William Gray, of Hartlepool.
- Francis Godschall Johnson, Chief Justice of the Superior Court, Quebec.
- Henry Ludlow, Chief Justice of the Leeward Islands.
- Robert John Pinsent DCL Senior Puisne Judge of the Supreme Court, Newfoundland.
- Henry Beyer Robertson, of Palé.
- Henry Trueman Wright Wood, secretary to the Society of Arts.
- John Compton Lawrance, a justice of the High Court
- Roland Lomax Vaughan Williams, a justice of the High Court
- Horatio Lloyd, county court judge and Chairman of the Quarter Sessions of Chester and Recorder of Chester

=== The Most Honourable Order of the Bath ===
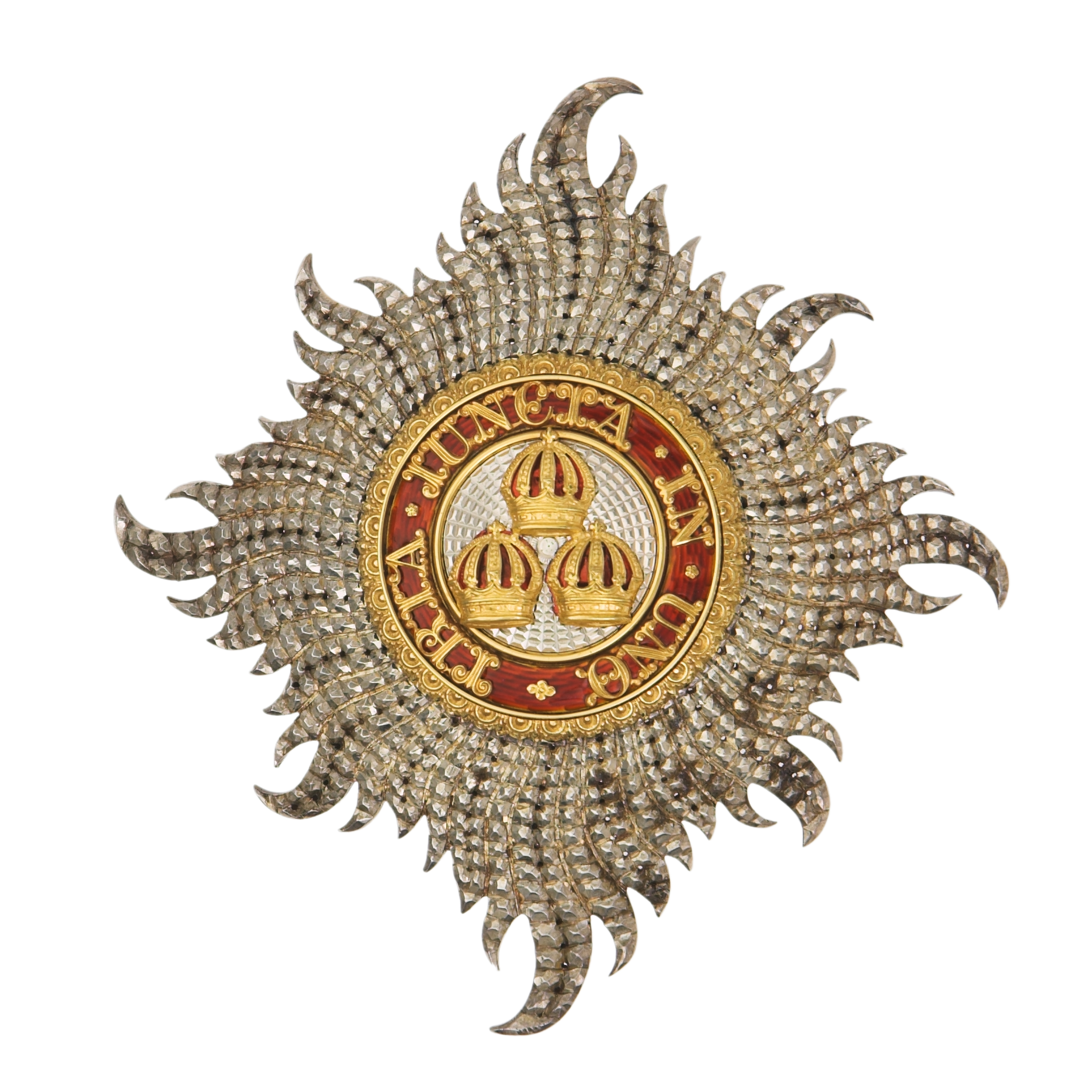
Civilian star of the Knight Grand Cross of the Order of the Bath

==== Knight Commander of the Order of the Bath (KCB) ====
Civil Division

- Col. Sir Edward Ridley Colborne Bradford KCSI Aide-de-Camp to the Queen.
- Henry George Calcraft CB Permanent Secretary to the Board of Trade.

==== Companion of the Order of the Bath (CB) ====
Civil Division

- Hugh Guion MacDonell CMG Her Majesty's Envoy Extraordinary and Minister Plenipotentiary at the Court of Copenhagen.
- William Chandler Roberts-Austen, Chemist and Assayer of the Royal Mint.
- Alfred Biliotti CMG Her Majesty's Consul for the Island of Crete.
- George Bullen, late Keeper of the Printed Books, British Museum.
- Patrick Coll, Chief Crown Solicitor for Ireland.
- Lt.-Col. John Farquharson, Royal Engineers, of the Ordnance Survey Department.
- Maj.-Gen. Charles Scrope Hutchinson, Royal Engineers (Retired), Inspector of Railways to the Board of Trade.
- Nicholas Harris Nicolas, Chief Clerk, Exchequer and Audit Department.
- Thomas Digby Pigott, Controller of Her Majesty's Stationery Office.
- Lt.-Col. Edward Vincent Stace (Bombay Staff Corps), Her Majesty's Consul for the Somali Coast.
- Henry Thynne, Deputy Inspector-General Royal Irish Constabulary.

=== The Most Exalted Order of the Star of India ===
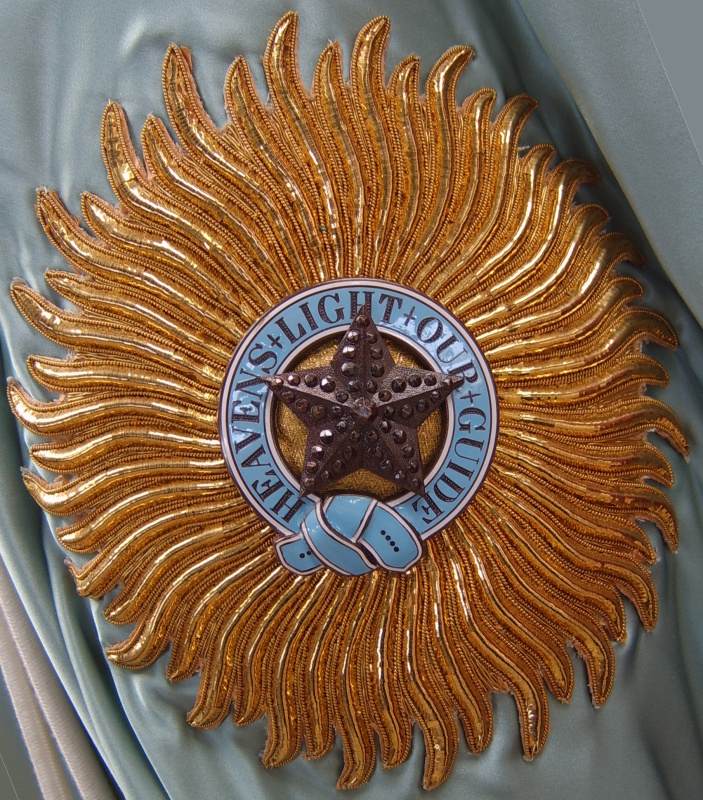
Star of a Knight Grand Commander of the Most Exalted Order of the Star of India.

==== Knight Commander (KCSI) ====
- Andrew Richard Scoble CSI Ordinary Member of the Council of the Governor-General of India.
- Dennis Fitzpatrick CSI Bengal Civil Service, Resident at Hyderabad.

==== Companion (CSI) ====
- Col. Charles Kenneth Mackenzie Walter, Bengal Staff Corps.
- Frederick Barnes Peacock, Bengal Civil Service, Member of the Board of Revenue, Bengal.
- James Richard Naylor, Bombay Civil Service, Remembrancer of Legal Affairs, Bombay.
- Frederick William Richard Fryer, Bengal Civil Service, Financial Commissioner in Burma.
- Robert Joseph Crosthwaite, Bengal Civil Service, Judicial Commissioner Central Provinces.
- Surgeon-Maj. Alfred Swaine Lethbridge Bengal Medical Service.

=== The Most Distinguished Order of Saint Michael and Saint George ===
Star of the Order of Saint Michael and Saint George.

==== Knight Grand Cross of the Order of St Michael and St George (GCMG) ====
- The Rt. Hon. Hussey Vivian, Baron Vivian KCMG CB Her Majesty's Envoy Extraordinary and Minister Plenipotentiary to His Majesty the King of the Belgians.

==== Knight Commander of the Order of St Michael and St George (KCMG) ====
- Joseph Archer Crowe CB Her Majesty's Commercial Attaché for Europe.
- Col. Casimir Stanislaus Gzowski, Honorary Aide-de-Camp to the Queen, for valuable services rendered in the Dominion of Canada.
- Charles Hall QC MP First British Delegate to the Maritime Conference at Washington.
- Augustus William Lawson Hemming CMG of the Colonial Office.
- George Glynn Petre CB Her Majesty's Envoy Extraordinary and Minister Plenipotentiary to His Majesty the King of Portugal.
- Lt.-Col. Frederick Thomas Sargood CMG formerly Minister of Defence of the Colony of Victoria.
- William Frederick Haynes Smith CMG Governor and Commander-in-Chief of the Leeward Islands.
- Sir Albert William Woods Kt CB Garter Principal King of Arms, ard King of Arms of the said Most Distinguished Order.

==== Companion of the Order of St Michael and St George (CMG) ====
- William Hood Treacher, Secretary to the Government of the Native State of Perak, Malay Peninsula.
- Morgan Stanislaus Grace Member of the Legislative Council of the Colony of New Zealand, and Surgeon-General of the Local Military Forces.
- William Henry Griffin, late Deputy Postmaster-General of the Dominion of Canada.
- Francis Seymour Haden, Colonial Secretary of Natal.
- Paolo Vella late Judge of the Court of Appeal of the Island of Malta.
- Walter Meredith Deane, Captain-Superintendent of Police of the Colony of Hong Kong, and Member of the Executive and Legislative Councils.
- Robert Knox MacBride, Director of Public Works of the Island of Ceylon.
- William Leworthy Goode Drew, Fleet Paymaster on the Retired List of the Royal Navy, Auditor-General of the Colony of Queensland.
- Henry Chamberlain Russell, Government Astronomer of the Colony of New South Wales.
- William James McKinney, Treasurer of the Colony of British Honduras.
- David Palmer Ross MRCS Colonial Surgeon of Sierra Leone.
- John Bird, formerly Treasurer of the Colony of Natal.
- Col. Josceline Heneage Wodehouse RA CB employed with the Egyptian Army.
- Alfred George Woodward Reid, an Officer of the Irrigation Works in Egypt.
- Harry de la Rosa Burrard Farnall, of the Foreign Office.

=== The Most Eminent Order of the Indian Empire ===
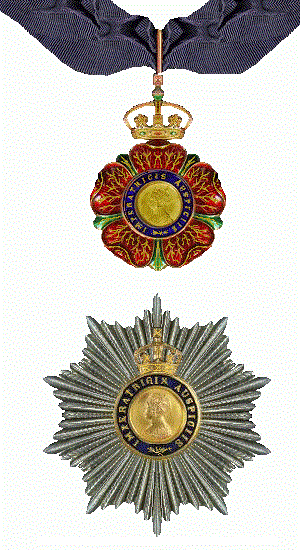
Riband, badge and star of the Knight Grand Commander of the Order of the Indian Empire

==== Knight Grand Commander of the Order of the Indian Empire (GCIE) ====
- The Rt. Hon. George Robert Canning, Lord Harris, Governor of the Presidency of Bombay.
- His Highness the Nawab of Junagarh.
- His Highness the Nawab of Tonk.
- The Nawab of Murshidabad, KCIE

==== Knight Commander of the Order of the Indian Empire (KCIE) ====
- James Bellett Richey, CSI, Bombay Civil Service.

==== Companion of the Order of the Indian Empire (CIE) ====
- James Robert Reid, Bengal Civil Service, Member of the Board of Revenue, North-Western Provinces.
- Raja Pratap Narayan Singh Deo of Jashpur.
- Colonel Samuel Swinton Jacob, Bombay Staff Corps.
- Pandit Suraj Kaul.
- John David Rees, Madras Civil Service.
- Abdul Karim Hafiz.
- Alexander McHinch, Member of the Council of the Governor of Bombay for making Laws and Regulations.
- Rao Bahadur Kesri Singh of Kuchaman.
- Robert Turnbull James Buckingham, Major of the Sibsagar Mounted Rides.
- Jeremiah Garnett Horsfall, Madras Civil Service.
- James George Henry Glass, Superintending Engineer and Secretary to Government in the Public Works Department, Central Provinces.
- Edmund Neel, Assistant Secretary in the Political and Secret Department, India Office.
- Captain George Lindsay Holford, 1st Life Guards, Equerry to His Royal Highness Prince Albert Victor of Wales.
