= Richey =

Richey is a surname and a given name. Notable people with these names include:

== Surname ==
- Alexander George Richey (1830–1883), Irish barrister and historian
- Charles Robert Richey (1923–1997), United States federal judge
- Cliff Richey (born 1946), American tennis player
- David Michael Richey (1938–2015), real name of the American jazz musician Slim Richey
- George Richey (1935–2010), American songwriter and record producer
- Helen Richey (1909–1947), American aviator
- Helen Richey (dancer) (born 1946), Australian ballroom and Latin dancer and judge
- Isabel Grimes Richey (1858–1910), American writer, poet
- James Alexander Richey (1874–1931), British imperial administrator, son of the following
- James Bellett Richey (1834–1902), British colonial administrator
- Joe Richey (1931–1995), American basketball player
- Joseph Richey (1843–1877), Anglo-Irish episcopal minister
- Kelly Richey (born 1962), American blues musician
- Kenny Richey (born 1964), British-US dual citizen once on death row
- Kim Richey (born 1956), American singer-songwriter
- Matthew Richey (1803–1883), Irish-Canadian Methodist
- Matthew Henry Richey (1828–1911), Canadian politician
- Mary Anne Richey (1917–1983), United States federal judge
- Michael Richey (sailor) (1917–2009), English sailor, winner of the John Llewellyn Rhys Prize 1942
- Michael Richey (scholar) (1678–1761), German scholar and poet, set the verses to Telemann's Admiralitätsmusik
- Nancy Richey (born 1942), American tennis player
- Ronald K. Richey (1926–2010), American financial services executive, CEO of Torchmark Corporation
- Wade Richey, American football player

== Given name ==
- Richey Edwards (born 1967, disappeared 1995, presumed dead 2008), Welsh musician, lyricist and rhythm guitarist of the alternative rock band Manic Street Preachers
- Richey V. Graham (1886–1972), American politician
- Richey Reneberg (born 1965), American tennis player

== See also ==
- USS Richey (DE-385), a World War II US Navy destroyer escort
- Richey, Montana, a town, United States
- Richie, a given name and surname
