= Ernest Fernando =

Ernest Fernando may refer to:

- Ernest Fernando (wrestler), Olympic wrestler for Ceylon
- Sir Ernest Peter Arnold Fernando (1904–1956), Ceylonese businessman and mine owner
