= Saidapet Chandrasekhara Mudaliyar =

Saidapet Chandrasekhara Mudaliyarentered the medical services as a civil apothecary in Tirukkoyilur (in the then South Arcot) in 1882. Bulk of his services were in South Arcot and Visakhapatnam (know as Vizagapatam during British Era). From a humble apothecary, he rose to the rank of District Medical and Sanitary Officer. In 1913, his services were recognised by the title Rao Sahib. In 1917, his title was raised to the higher dignity of Rao Bahadur. He also worked as a instructor at a medical school in Vizagapatam.

He was recounted by Sir Lionel Davidson during the first session of Madras Legislative Council, 1920 held on February 14th 1921. Davidson also moved for the council to record their sincere regret over Rao Bahadur S. Chandrasekhara Mudaliyar's demise and the deep sympathy for his bereaved family. The resolution was also supported by A.P. Patro and U. Rama Rao.

Chandrasekhara had contested the elections from the Vizagapatam urban constituency for 1921 Madras Legislative Council and had won 351 out of the 717 registered votes. There were 4 other candidates who contested against him. However he died before the commencement of the Madras Legislative Council sessions.
