= 1911 New Year Honours =

Appointments by King George V to various orders and honours

The New Year Honours 1911 were appointments by King George V to various orders and honours to reward and highlight good works by members of the British Empire. They were announced on 3 January 1911.

== The Most Honourable Order of the Bath ==
=== Knight Grand Cross (GCB) ===
Military Division

- Admiral Sir Archibald Lucius Douglas, G.C.V.O., K.C.B.

== Order of the Star of India ==
=== Knight Grand Commander (GCSI) ===
- Sir Steuart Colvin Bayley, K.C.S.I., C.I.E., formerly Lieutenant-Governor of Bengal
- Sir Dennis Fitzpatrick, K.C.S.I., formerly Lieutenant-Governor of the Punjab
- Sir William Lee-Warner, K.C.S.I. Member of the Council of India

=== Knight Commander (KCSI) ===
- John Ontario Miller, Esq., C.S.I., Indian Civil Service, lately an Ordinary Member of the Council of the Governor-General of India
- Lionel Montague Jacob, Esq., C.S.I.. M.I.C.E., Secretary to the Government of India, Public Works Department, and an Additional Member of the Council of the Governor-General of India for making Laws and Regulations
- Murray Hammick, Esq.. C.S.I., C.I.E., an Ordinary Member of the Council of the Governor of Fort St. George

=== Companion (CSI) ===
- Colonel (temporary Major-General) Reginald Henry Mahon, C.B., Director-General of Ordnance in India
- Michael William Fenton, Esq., Indian Civil Service, Chief Secretary to the Government of the Punjab, and an Additional Member of the Council of the Lieutenant-Governor of the Punjab for making Laws and Regulations
- Lieutenant-Colonel Alexander Fleetwood Pinhey, C.I.E., Indian Army, lately Private Secretary to His Excellency the Governor-General of India
- Captain Allen Thomas Hunt, Royal Navy, in command of HMS Fox
- Henry Walter Badock, Esq., Accountant-General, India Office
- James Mollison, Esq., Inspector-General of Agriculture with the Government of India
- Pirajiraos Bapu Saheb Ghatge, C.I.E., Chief of Kagal (Senior Branch), Kolhapur

== Order of Saint Michael and Saint George ==
=== Knight Grand Cross (GCMG) ===
- The Right Honourable Lord Balfour of Burleigh, P.C., K.T.; in recognition of services in connection with the Royal Commission on trade relations between Canada and the West Indian Colonies
- The Right Honourable Lord Robson, P.C., in recognition of services in connection with the North Atlantic Coast Fisheries Arbitration

=== Knight Commander (KCMG) ===
- The Right Honourable Lord Islington, D.S.O., Governor and Commander-in-Chief of the Dominion of New Zealand
- Reginald Laurence Antrobus, Esq., C.B., a Crown Agent for the Colonies
- Ernest Woodford Birch, Esq., C.M.G., British Resident, Perak
- The Honourable Allen Bristol Aylesworth, K.C., Minister of Justice of the Dominion of Canada; in recognition of services in connection with the North Atlantic Coast Fisheries Arbitration
- Henry Paul Harvey, Esq., C.B., Financial Adviser to the Egyptian Government
- Richard Frederick Crawford, Esq., one of His Majesty's Commissioners of Customs; in commemoration of the establishment of the Union of South Africa
- The Right Honourable Frederick Robert Moor, D.C.L., Senator of the Union of South Africa; one of the delegates from Natal to the South African National Convention
- Sir James Percy FitzPatrick, Kt., Member of the House of Assembly of the Union of South Africa; one of the delegates from the Transvaal to the South African National Convention
- The Honourable Nicolaas Frederic de Waal, Administrator of the Province of the Cape of Good Hope
- The Honourable Edward Philip Solomon, Senator of the Union of South Africa
- The Honourable Thomas William Smartt, Member of the House of Assembly of the Union of South Africa; one of the delegates from the Cape of Good Hope to the South African National Convention
- The Honourable Edgar Harris Walton, Member of the House of Assembly of the Union of South Africa; one of the delegates from the Cape of Good Hope to the South African National Convention
- Abe Bailey, Esq., lately Member of the Legislative Assembly of the Transvaal

=== Companion (CMG) ===
- Lieutenant-Colonel Henry Robert Smith, I.S.O., Sergeant-at-Arms of the House of Commons of the Dominion of Canada
- George Handley Knibbs, Esq., Commonwealth Statistician, Commonwealth of Australia
- Frederick Manson Bailey, Esq., Colonial Botanist of the State of Queensland
- Lieutenant-Colonel Francis William Panzera, Resident Commissioner, Bechuanaland Protectorate
- John Penry Lewis, Esq., M.A., late Government Agent for the Central Province of the Island of Ceylon
- James Crawford Maxwell, Esq., District Commissioner, Sierra Leone
- Major Richard Alfred Poer O'Shee, R.E.; in recognition of services in connection with the Anglo-Portuguese Boundary Commission, East Africa, 1904–1906, and the Anglo-French Boundary Commission, Niger and Lake Chad, 1906–1909
- Major John Arthur Hannyngton; in recognition of services in Somaliland
- Colonel George Samuel Abercrombie Harvey, Pasha, Commandant of the Cairo City Police
- Evelyn Mountstuart Grant Duff, Esq., His Majesty's Consul-General at Buda-Pesth
- Philip Alphonso Somers Cocks, Esq., His Majesty's Consul at Lisbon

in commemoration of the establishment of the Union of South Africa

- Albert Browne, Esq., I.S.O., one of the delegates from the Orange River Colony to the South African National Convention

== Order of the Indian Empire ==
=== Knight Commander (KCIE) ===
- Rear-Admiral Edmond John Warre Slade, M.V.O., Royal Navy, Commander-in-Chief, East Indies
- John Benton, Esq., C.I.E., F.C.H., M.I.C.E., Inspector-General of Irrigation with the Government of India

=== Companion (CIE) ===
- John Barry Wood, Esq., Indian Civil Service, Deputy Secretary to the Government of India, Foreign Department
- Lieutenant-Colonel George Grant Gordon, V.D., Commandant, Northern Bengal Mounted Rifles, and an Additional Member of the Council of the Lieutenant-Governor of Bengal for making Laws and Regulations
- Colonel Ralph Champneys Broome, Indian Army, Director-General, Army Remount Department
- Colonel Frank Goodwin, V.D., Locomotive Superintendent, Rajputana-Malwa Railway, and Commandant, 2nd Battalion, Bombay, Baroda and Central India Railway Volunteer Rifles
- Lieutenant-Colonel George Frederick Chenevix-Trench, Indian Army, Political Agent in Zhob
- Archibald Young Gipps Campbell, Esq., Indian Civil Service, Private Secretary to the Governor of Madras
- Andrew Bigoe Barnard, Esq., Bengal Police Department, Deputy Director Criminal Intelligence
- James Adolphus Guider, Esq., Superintendent of Police, Bombay
- John Paul Warburton, Esq., Punjab Police Department (retired), lately Inspector-General of Police, Patiala State
- James William Douglas Johnstone, Esq., Director General of Education, Gwalior State
- Fakir Sayad Iftakhar-ud-din, Punjab Provincial Service, and some time British Agent at Kabul

== Royal Victorian Order ==
=== Member, 5th Class ===
- Joseph Morris, Esq., Superintendent of the Line, Great Western Railway Company (with effect from 21 December 1910)
- Robert Turnbull, Esq., Superintendent of the Line, London and North-Western Railway Company (with effect from 2 January 1911)
