= Governor Maxwell =

Governor Maxwell may refer to:

- James Maxwell (colonial administrator) (1869–1932), Governor of Northern Rhodesia from 1927 to 1932
- John Maxwell (British Army officer) (1859–1929), Governor of Nubia in 1897, Governor of Omdurman in 1898, Governor of Pretoria and the Western Transvaal from 1900 to 1902
- John Robert Maxwell (fl. 1780s), Irish politician and Royal Governor of the Bahama Islands, 1783/4
- William Edward Maxwell (1846–1897), Governor of the Gold Coast from 1895 to 1897
