= Bogala Graphite Mine =

Graphite mine in Sri Lanka

Coordinates: 7°6′57″N 80°18′36″E

- Location within Sri Lanka

Location
- Location: Aruggammana Road, Aruggammana, Sabaragamuwa Province, Sri Lanka

Production
- Products: Graphite
- Greatest depth: 560 m (1,840 ft)

History
- Opened: 1847; 179 years ago

Owner
- Company: Bogala Graphite Lanka PLC
- Website: gk-graphite.lk

Bogala Graphite Mine (Sinhala: බොගල ග්‍රැෆයිට් පතල) is a graphite mine located near the village of Aruggammana in Kegalle District, Sabaragamuwa Province. It is one of the largest graphite mines in Sri Lanka, with commercial mining at this location first commencing in 1847.

Merenyagé Arnolis Fernando, born 12 August 1850 in Moratuwa, the second son of Merenyagé Juanis Fernando, a carpenter, and Silapu Perumagé Angela Fernando. Fernando started work as a carpenter but went onto become a foreman on a Sinhalese graphite mine. In the 1880s he became a graphite mine owner in his own right and over the next two decades assembled considerable capital assets. By 1906/07 he controlled a number of graphite mines including sites at Pusshena, Aruggammana, Medagoda, Panangala and Kurunduwatte, as well as a number of coconut and cinnamon plantations. His sons, James Alfred Fernando (1894–1936) and Ernest Peter Arnold Fernando (1904–1956), were responsible for expanding the family company's, A. Fernando and Co., interests at Bogala where they discovered a substantial graphite vein, founding the Bogala Graphite Company in 1941.

The Bogala mine was nationalised in 1971 falling under the control of the State Graphite Corporation of Ceylon, which was renamed in 1979 to the State Mining and Mineral Development Corporation. In 1991 the mine was subsequently privatised under the ownership of Bogala Graphite Ltd. In 1999 Germany's Graphit Kropfmühl AG initially acquired a 20% share in the company, increased their shareholding to 80% in 2001 and 88% by 2004. Graphit Kropfmühl AG currently owns 79.58% of the company and the other, Graphite is mined through open pit and underground methods. major shareholder is Alterna GK LLC which controls a 10.33% stake.

In 2013 the maximum depth of the shaft at Bogala mines was 560 m (1,840 ft) and the deepest mining level was 503 m (1,650 ft), although various explorations estimate that the veins progress beyond 600 m (2,000 ft). There are three main graphite veins at Bogala, the Na, Mee and Kumbuk. The Mee vein has been mined out with the Mee vein merging with Na vein at approximately 344 m (1,129 ft). At 293 m (961 ft) the Kumbuk vein splits and this split vein is the most productive vein in operation. The average vein thickness in Bogala is about 20–40 cm (7.9–15.7 in). The carbon grade of graphite at Bogala varies between 85% and 99.9%.

== See also ==
- Graphite mining in Sri Lanka
