= Dennis Fitzpatrick (civil servant) =

Administrator in India

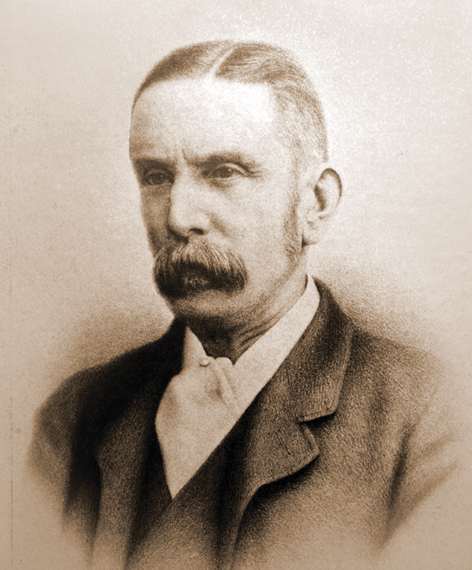
Former Governor of Punjab

Sir Dennis Fitzpatrick, GCSI (26 August 1837 – 20 May 1920) was a British administrator in India. A member of the Indian Civil Service, he became Lieutenant-Governor of the Punjab 1892–1897.

== Life and career ==
Fitzpatrick was born in Dublin in 1837 the son of a physician, he was educated at Trinity College, Dublin. In 1858 Fitzpatrick passed the Indian Civil Service examination and the following year joined the Punjab Commission. He worked in the Delhi territory as a magistrate until called for special duties related to the government defence of a case brought by the heirs of Begum Samru related to confiscation of estates and seizure of arms during the Indian Rebellion of 1857. As part of his special duties he returned to England in March 1869 and he was called to the bar by the Inner Temple.

Returning to India, Fizpatrick became a deputy-secretary in the Legislative Department and in 1876 a Judge of the Chief Court in Lahore. He then became Secretary of the Legislative Department and acted as Secretary of the Home Department in early 1885. At the end of 1885 he became Resident in Mysore and for a few months Chief Commissioner of Coorg. In October 1887 he was Chief Commissioner in Assam before being transferred two years later to be Resident at Hyderabad. In the 1890 Birthday Honours he was appointed Knight Commander of the Order of the Star of India.

In March 1892 he returned to the Punjab as Lieutenant-Governor, a role he undertook until 1897 when he returned to the United Kingdom to join the London-based Council of India. Fitzpatrick retired from the Council in 1907. He was upgraded to Knight Grand Commander (GCSI) in the 1911 New Year Honours.

== Family ==
Fitzpatrick married Mary Buller in 1862, they had a large family, two daughters had died in India as well as a son who died in a railway accident, they had two further sons. Fitzpatrick died in London on 20 May 1920.

Government offices
Preceded by Sir James Lyall	Lieutenant-Governor of the Punjab; 1892–1897	Succeeded by Sir William Young
