= Pararajasingam Nadesan =

Ceylonese civil servant

Pararajasingam "Park" Nadesan
- Born: 20 December 1917; Ceylon (now Sri Lanka)
- Occupation: Civil servant
- Years active: 1941–1956
- Known for: Secretary to the Prime Minister of Ceylon
- Awards: OBE (1954), CMG (1955)

Pararajasingam "Park" Nadesan, CMG, OBE (20 December 1917 - ) was a Ceylonese civil servant. He was the Secretary to the Prime Minister of Ceylon.

Educated at the Ceylon University College, he graduated with a BA from the University of London. He joined the Ceylon Civil Service in June 1941 as a cadet on appointment of the Governor. He served in the Kegalle, Kandy and Batticaloa Kachcheris. Promoted to class 2, he served as an assistant government agent, additional magistrate, additional deputy controller of labor, land officer, assistant secretary - ministry of transport and works, before appointment as additional secretary to the prime minister and director civil aviation. In 1953, he succeeded Nandasara Wijetilaka Atukorala as secretary to the prime minister.

Nadesan's was perceived to be loyal to Sir John Kotelawala during his term as prime minister, which meant that S. W. R. D. Bandaranaike on his appointment as prime minister in 1956 did not want Nadesan to stay on. The post of Secretary to the Prime Minister was abolished and Nadesan allowed to retire early. Gunasena de Soyza, Permanent Secretary to the Ministry of External Affairs and Defence officially took over assisted by Bradman Weerakoon, who was the assistant secretary to the prime minister at the time.

He was appointed an Officer of the Order of the British Empire in the 1954 Birthday Honours and a Companion of the Order of St Michael and St George in the 1955 New Year Honours.
