= Wilfrid Ramsbotham =

English cricketer

Personal information
- Full name: Wilfrid Hubert Ramsbotham
- Born: 20 December 1888; Ipsden, Oxfordshire, England
- Died: 7 November 1978 (aged 89); Kensington, London, England
- Batting: Right-handed
- Relatives: Richard Ramsbotham (cousin)

Domestic team information
- Years: Team
- 1908–1910: Sussex
- 1908–1909: Cambridge University

Career statistics
Competition	First-class
Matches	9
Runs scored	245
Batting average	16.33
100s/50s	–/1
Top score	56
Balls bowled	–
Wickets	–
Bowling average	–
5 wickets in innings	–
10 wickets in match	–
Best bowling	–
Catches/stumpings	2/–
- Source: Cricinfo, 15 March 2012

Wilfrid Hubert Ramsbotham (20 December 1888 – 7 November 1978) was an English cricketer. Rambotham was a right-handed batsman. He was born at Ipsden, Oxfordshire, and was educated at Uppingham School.

While studying at the University of Cambridge, Ramsbotham made his first-class debut for Cambridge University against Kent in 1908. In that same season, he made his first-class debut for Sussex against Cambridge University, as well as making his County Championship against Hampshire in that same season. The following season, he made his second and final first-class appearance for Cambridge University against the touring Australians. For Sussex, he went on to make five further first-class appearances for the county, the last of which came against Oxford University in 1910. In total, Rambotham made seven first-class appearances for Sussex, scoring 210 runs at an average of 19.09, with a high score of 56. This score was his only first-class half century and came against Cambridge University in 1909.

He died at Kensington, London, on 7 November 1978. His cousin, Richard Ramsbotham, also played first-class cricket.
