= John Clauson =

British Army officer

Major Sir John Eugene Clauson KCMG CVO (13 November 1866 – 31 December 1918) was a British Army officer and colonial administrator. He was Lieutenant-Governor and Chief Secretary to Government of the Island of Malta and its Dependencies from 1911 to 1914, and High Commissioner of Cyprus from 1915 until his death.

Educated at Merchant Taylors' School, Clifton College, and the Royal Military Academy, Woolwich, Clauson was commissioned into the Royal Engineers in 1885. He graduated BA (Hons) from the University of London in 1887. In 1889, he designed a pontoon which was still in use in the Army at the time of his death. He passed the Staff College, Camberley in 1893, ranking first. He was on the Army Headquarters Staff from 1895 to 1900. He was admitted to the Inner Temple in 1897.

He was appointed a Commander of the Royal Victorian Order in 1912 and Knight Commander of the Order of St Michael and St George in the 1913 New Year Honours.

His eldest son was Sir Gerard Clauson, Assistant Under-Secretary of State at the Colonial Office from 1940 to 1951.
