= William Frederick Bailey =

Irish lawyer and writer

Bailey in c1916.

William Frederick Bailey CB PC (Ire) (9 February 1857 – 16 April 1917), was an Irish lawyer and writer.

Bailey was born in Castletown Conyers, County Limerick, Ireland. He was educated in Trinity College Dublin, and called to the Irish Bar in 1881. He practised on the Munster Circuit and was Barrington lecturer in Political Economy TCD and Extern in English for the Intermediate Education Board.

Bailey was one of the Secretaries to the Royal Commission on Irish Published Works (1880), Legal Assistant to the Commissioners under the Purchase of Land (Ireland) Act 1885 and Secretary to the Statistical and Social Inquiry of 1902. He was appointed CB in the 1906 Birthday Honours and became a Privy Councillor in 1909.

His works included 'Local and Centralised Government in Ireland' (1888) and 'Ireland since the Famine' (1902). He also published editions of poetry including works of Gray and Coleridge.

== Works ==
- The Law Of Franchise And Registration In Ireland
- Report On The Condition Of Peasant Purchasers In Ireland
- Local And Centralised Government In Ireland, (1888)
- Ireland Since The Famine, (1902)
- The Slavs Of The War Zone, (1916)
- The Irish Land Acts: a short sketch of their history and development, Dublin: HM Stationery Office, 1917, Wikidata Q107712188
