= Horatio Lloyd =

English judge

Sir Horatio Lloyd (29 September 1829 – 1 January 1921) was an English barrister and County Court judge. He was also chairman of the Quarter Sessions of Chester and Recorder of Chester.

Lloyd was born in Chester in the county of Cheshire, England, the son of a lawyer who was Prothonotary and Clerk of the Crown for the Chester and North Wales Circuit. Many of his family were in the legal profession. In 1874 he was appointed County Court judge for the Chester and North Wales Circuit. Patrick Polden states that Lloyd had been appointed by Lord Chancellor Cairns to oblige a Cabinet colleague. He was a popular judge locally, and the Duke of Westminster presented him with 1,000 guineas and a service of plate in recognition of his services to the county.

He lived at Sefton House in Penmaenmawr in 1901 with his wife Harriette Rigby and servants according to the 1901 Census.

They had 4 children.

He was knighted in the 1890 Birthday Honours, but was forced to resign in 1906 because of ill-health.

A Freemason, Lloyd was at one time Deputy Grand Master of Cheshire.

== See also ==
- Chester (non-metropolitan district)
- Chester Rural District
