= 1913 New Year Honours =

Appointments by King George V to various orders and honours

The New Year Honours 1913 were appointments by King George V to various orders and honours to reward and highlight good works by members of the British Empire. They were announced on 3 January 1913.

== Order of the Bath ==
=== Knight Grand Cross (GCB) ===
Military Division

- Admiral of the Fleet Sir Gerard Henry Uctred Noel, K.C.B., K.C.M.G.

=== Knight Commander (KCB) ===
Military Division

- Vice-Admiral Frederick Tower Hamilton, C.V.O.
- Inspector-General of Hospitals and Fleets Duncan Hilston, C.B., M.D. (retired).

Civil Division

- Sir John Anderson, G.C.M.G. (ex-Governor of Straits Settlements)
- Lewis Amherst Selby-Bigge, Esq., C.B.

=== Companion (CB) ===
Civil Division

- Rear-Admiral Robert Nelson Ommanney.
- Rear-Admiral Richard Henry Peirse, M.V.O.
- Engineer Rear-Admiral Arthur William Turner.
- Captain Charles Martin de Bartolome, R.N.
- Lieutenant-Colonel William Campbell Hyslop, Secretary of the City of London Territorial Force Association.
- Benjamin Hansford, Esq., One of His Majesty's Lieutenants for the City of London.
- George Lewis Barstow, Esq.
- James Ernest Chapman, Esq.
- William James Downer, Esq., C.M.G., I.S.O.
- Thomas Philip Le Fanu, Esq.
- George Henry Tripp, Esq.

== Order of the Star of India ==
=== Knight Grand Commander (GCSI) ===
- His Highness Amin-ud-Daula Wazir-ul-Mulk Nawab Sir Muhammad Ibrahim Ali Khan, Bahadur, Saulat Jang, G.C.I.E., of Tonk, Rajputana.

=== Knight Commander (KCSI) ===
- Sir George Head Barclay, K.C.M.G., C.V.O., lately Envoy Extraordinary and Minister Plenipotentiary at Teheran.
- Lieutenant-General Sir James Willcocks, K.C.M.G., C.B., D.S.O., General Officer Commanding the Northern Army in India.

=== Companion (CSI) ===
- Raja Jai Chand of Lambagraon, Honorary Lieutenant-Colonel, 37th Dogras.
- Lionel Davidson, Esq., Indian Civil Service, Acting Secretary to the Government of Madras, Local and Municipal, Educational and Legislative Departments, and an Additional Member of the Council of the Governor of Fort St. George for making Laws and Regulations.
- George Carmichael, Esq., Indian Civil Service, Chief Secretary to the Government of Bombay, and an Additional Member of the Council of the Governor of Bombay for making Laws and Regulations.
- Lieutenant-Colonel Donald John Campbell MacNabb, Indian Army, Commissioner, Burma.
- Lieutenant-Colonel Henry Walter George Cole, Director, Temporary Works, Delhi, Government of India.
- Stuart Mitford Fraser, Esq., C.I.E., Resident in Kashmir.
- Henry Venn Cobb, Esq., C.I.E., late Resident at Baroda.

== Order of Saint Michael and Saint George ==
=== Knight Commander (KCMG) ===
- Frederick John Jackson, Esq., C.B., C.M.G., Governor and Commander-in-Chief of the Uganda Protectorate.
- The Right Honourable Sir Edward Patrick Morris, Knt., K.C., Prime Minister of Newfoundland.
- The Honourable Sir James Pliny Whitney, Knt., K.C., President of the Council and Premier of the Province of Ontario.
- Major John Eugene Clauson, C.V.O., C.M.G., Lieutenant-Governor and Chief Secretary to Government of the Island of Malta and its Dependencies.
- Edward Lewis Brockman, Esq., C.M.G., Chief Secretary to Government Federated Malay States.
- His Highness Sultan Mohamed bin Almerhum Sultan Mohamed, Sultan of Kelantan. (Honorary)
- William George Tyrrell, Esq., C.B., of the Foreign Office, Private Secretary to His Majesty's Principal Secretary of State for Foreign Affairs.
- Robert John Kennedy, Esq., C.M.G., lately His Majesty's Envoy Extraordinary and Minister Plenipotentiary at Montevideo.
- Henry Crofton Lowther, Esq., His Majesty's Envoy Extraordinary and Minister Plenipotentiary designate at Copenhagen.

=== Companion (CMG) ===
- George Thomas Allen, Esq., I.S.O., Secretary to the Department of the Treasury, and Commissioner of Pensions, Commonwealth of Australia.
- Lieutenant-Colonel William Patrick Anderson, Chief Engineer, Department of Marine and Fisheries, Dominion of Canada.
- Horace Bedwell, Esq., Provincial Commissioner, Southern Nigeria.
- Engineer-Captain William Clarkson, Third Naval Member, Board of Naval Administration, Commonwealth of Australia.
- Wyndham Rowland Dunstan, Esq., LL.D., F.R.S., Director of the Imperial Institute.
- John George Fraser, Esq., Acting Government Agent, Western Province, Island of Ceylon.
- George Garnett, Esq., Member of the Executive Council and of the Combined Court of the Colony of British Guiana.
- The Honourable Timothy Francis Quinlan, late Speaker of the Legislative Assembly of the State of Western Australia.
- Leonard Stowe, Esq., Clerk of Parliaments, Dominion of New Zealand.
- Henry Barclay Walcott, Esq., Collector of Customs of the Colony of Trinidad and Tobago.
- Alfred Henry Wilshere, Esq., Collector of Customs, Cape Town Union of South Africa.
- Zachary Taylor Wood, Esq., Assistant Commissioner, Royal North-West Mounted Police Force, Dominion of Canada.

== Order of the Indian Empire ==
=== Kniqht Grand Commander (GCIE) ===
- His Highness Sri Brahadamba Das Raja Martanda Bhairava Tondiman Bahadur of Pudukkottai, Madras.

=== Knights Commanders (KCIE) ===
- Alfred Gibbs Bourne, Esq., C.I.E., D.Sc., F.R.S., Director of Public Instruction, Madras, and an Additional Member of the Council of the Governor of Fort St. George for making Laws and Regulations.
- Meherban Parashramrav Ramchandrarav alias Bhausaheb Patwardan, Chief of Jamkhandi, Bombay.
- Frank Campbell Gates, Esq., C.S.I., Indian Civil Service, Financial Commissioner, Burma.
- George Macartney, Esq., C.I.E., Consul-General at Kashgar.
- Edward Douglas Maclagan, Esq., C.S.I., Indian Civil Service, Secretary to the Government of India, Department of Revenue and Agriculture, and an Additional Member of the Council of the Governor-General of India for making Laws and Regulations.
- Major-General George John Younghusband, C.B., General Officer Commanding the Derajat Brigade.

=== Companion (CIE) ===
- Rana Hira Singh of Dhami, Simla Hill State, Punjab.
- Alexander Blake Shakespear, Esq., Secretary to the Upper India Chamber of Commerce.
- John Hope Simpson, Esq., Indian Civil Service, Magistrate and Collector, Gorakhpur, United Provinces, India.
- Major Hugh Stewart, Indian Army, Deputy Commissioner; Bannu, North-West Frontier Province, India.
- Major William Glen Liston,. M.D., Indian Medical Service, Director of Bacteriological Laboratory, Parel, and Senior Member of the Plague Research Commission.
- Lieutenant-Colonel Edwin Henry DeVere Atkinson, R.E., Principal, Thomason College, Roorkee, United Provinces, India.
- Walter Stanley Talbot, Esq;, Indian Civil Service, Settlement Commissioner, Kashmir State.
- Frank Adrian Lodge, Esq., Conservator of Forests, Western Circle, Madras.
- Colonel Robert William Layard Dunlop, V.D., Colonel of the Bombay Volunteer Rifles, and Honorary Aide-de-Camp to the Governor of Bombay.
- Lieutenant-Colonel Walter James Buchanan, M.D., Indian Medical Service, Inspector-General of Prisons, Bengal.
- Raja Hrishi Kesh Laha, of Bengal.
- Nalini Bhusan Gupta, Esq., Barrister-at-Law, late Director of Public Prosecutions, Dacca, Eastern Bengal and Assam.
- Joseph Terence Owen Barnard, Esq., Assistant Superintendent for the Kachin Hills, Myitkyina District, Burma.
- Lieutenant-Colonel Townley Richard Filgate, V.D., Bihar Light Horse, Secretary to the Bihar Indigo Planters' Association.
- Alexander Macdonald Rouse, Esq., Superintendent, Temporary Works, Delhi.
- Charles Cahill Sheridan, Esq., Officiating Postmaster-General, Punjab, and North-West Frontier Province, India.
- Major Edward Mary Joseph Molyneux, D.S.O., Indian Army, Officiating Inspector-General, Imperial Service Troops.
- Captain Herbert de Lisle Pollard-Lowsley, R.E., Executive Engineer and Under-Secretary, Public Works Department, Central Provinces, India.
- Major William Wilfrid Bickford, Indian Army, late Commandant of the Zhob Militia, Baluchistan.
- Lieutenant-Colonel John George Knowles, V.D., Commandant, Surma Valley Light Horse.
- Major George Dodd, Indian Army, Political Agent, Wano, and Commandant, Southern Waziristan Militia.
- Henry Cuthbert Streatfeild, Esq., Indian Civil Service, Commissioner, Tirhut Division, Bihar and Orissa.
- Major Cecil Kaye, General Staff Officer, Army Headquarters, India.
- William Foster, Esq., Registrar and Superintendent of Records, India Office.

== Royal Victorian Order ==
=== Knight Commander (KCVO) ===
- Major-General Charles Crutchley, M.V.O.

=== Commander (CVO) ===
- The Hon. Richard Charles Moreton, M.V.O.
- Frederick Morris Fry, Esq., M.V.O.

=== Member, 5th Class ===
- William Cullen, Esq.

== Companions of the Imperial Service Order ==
Home Civil Service

- John Malcolm Hiley, Esq., the Court Postmaster.

Indian Civil Service

Office of the Secretary of State for India.

- Frederick George Hill, Esq., Staff Clerk, Accountant-General's Department, India Office.

Civil Services in India.

- Herbert Moir Stowell, Esq., Personal Assistant to the Adjutant-General in India.
- Babu Bepin Vehari Das, Assistant, Ordnance Branch, Army Headquarters.
- Walter Burr-Bryan, Esq., Registrar, Civil Secretariat, Punjab.
- Pandit Mani Ram, Deputy Collector, Irrigation Branch, Public Works Department Muzaffargarh, Punjab.
- George William Judd, Esq., Superintendent, Preventive Service, Karachi, Sind, Bombay.
- M. R. Ry. Rao Bahadur Tandalam Sundara Rao Avargar, B.A., Treasury Deputy Collector, Trichinopoly, Madras.
- Edward Alexander Chadwick Walker, Esq., Senior Registrar, Burma Secretariat.
- Ravji Balaji Karandikar, Esq., late Educational Inspector, Southern Division, Bombay.
- David James Murtrie, Esq., late Chief Superintendent and Postmaster, Coronation Durbar Post Office.
- Mating Shwe Tha, K.S.M., A.T.M., District Superintendent of Police, Burma.
- Charles Edward Pyster, Esq., Superintendent in the Foreign Department, Government of India.
- Dhanjishah Dinshah Mehta, Esq., Judicial Assistant Commissioner, Ajmer.
- Henry Clarke, Esq., Secretary to the Municipality of the Civil and Military Station, Bangalore.
- Ganga Narayan Ray, Esq., Additional Magistrate, Bakarganj, Bengal.
- Charles Willford, Esq., Executive Engineer, Central Provinces.
- Babu Ainbica Gtiaran Chatterjee, Sherishtadar of the District Judge's, Court, Comilla, Bengal.
- Paul Johannes Bruhl, Esq., D.Sc., M.I.E.E., F.G.S., F.C.S., Professor of the Civil Engineering College, Sibpur, Bengal.
- Norman Orton Peters, Esq., Manager, Jorhat State Railway, Assam.

== King's Police Medal ==
England and Wales

Police Forces

- Sir Melville Leslie Macnaghten, C.B., Assistant Commissioner of the Metropolitan Police.
- Lieutenant J . D. Kellie MacCallum, Chief Constable of Northamptonshire.
- Edward Holmes, Chief Constable of Leicestershire.
- Isaac George Lewis, Chief Constable of the Blackburn Borough Police.
- Walter Stocks Davies, late Chief Constable of the Birkenhead Borough Police.
- John Copping, late Superintendent and Deputy Chief Constable, Huntingdonshire Constabulary.
- Eliab William Breton, Deputy Chief Constable, Staffordshire Constabulary.
- William Graham, Deputy Chief Constable, Cumberland and Westmorland Constabulary.
- Joseph Bowen, late Superintendent, Oxfordshire Constabulary.
- Thomas Barnett, late Superintendent, Lancashire Constabulary.
- Christopher Pitson, Superintendent, Buckinghamshire Constabulary.
- James Davis, Superintendent, Berkshire Constabulary.
- Harry Laver, Superintendent, Essex Constabulary.
- Onslow Wakeford, Superintendent, Metropolitan Police.
- Alfred James Nicholls, Superintendent, City of London Police.
- Fred Stafford, Inspector, Yorkshire (West Riding) Constabulary.
- Edmund Waters, Sergeant, Metropolitan Police.
- Henry Linaker, Sergeant, Lancashire Constabulary.
- Thomas Little, Albert Winton, Joseph Root, Thomas Ravening, William Silvery, Bertie Spencer, Constables, Metropolitan Police.
- Charles Berg, Constable, City of London Police.
- Christopher Adamson, Constable, Lancashire Constabulary.
- Clement Bristow, Constable, West Sussex Constabulary.
- William Henry Gray, Constable, Leicester Borough Police.

Fire Brigades

- J. Neill, Fireman, London Fire Brigade.
- George Beesley, Fireman, Colne Borough Fire Brigade.

Scotland

- James V. Stevenson, Chief Constable, Glasgow City Police.
- Kenneth Cameron, Deputy Chief Constable, Ross and Cromarty Constabulary.
- Alexander Ferguson Mennie, Superintendent, Glasgow City Police.
- Donald Henderson, Inspector, Inverness-shire Constabulary.
- Elliot Jackson, late Inspector, Roxburghshire Constabulary.
- Joseph Clark Cruickshank, Constable, Orkney Constabulary.

Ireland

- James Dunne, Superintendent, Dublin Metropolitan Police.
- Charles Costello, Sergeant, Royal Irish Constabulary.
- James D. Leslie, Acting Sergeant, Royal Irish Constabulary.

Indian Forces

- Tyagaraja Aiyar, Sub-Inspector, Madras Police.
- Arthanan, Head Constable, Madras Police.
- George Robert Humphreys, Inspector, Madras Police.
- Frederick Arnold Hamilton, Superintendent, Indian Police (Madras).
- M. R. Ry. Tiruvaiyar Venkoba Row, Deputy Superintendent, Madras Police.
- Percy Beart Thomas, Deputy Inspector-General, Indian Police (Madras).
- Lumley Holland Spence, Deputy Inspector-General, Indian Police (Bombay).
- Frank Arthur Money Hampe Vincent, M.V.O., Deputy Commissioner, Criminal Investigation Department, Indian Police (Bombay).
- Khan Sahib Suliman Karam Khan, Inspector, Bombay Police.
- William James Nolan, late Senior Superintendent, Bombay Police.
- Rao Saheb Maruti Tukaram Kamte, Inspector, Criminal Investigation Department, Bombay Police.
- Surajballi Goala, Constable, Bengal Police.
- Saiyid Hussain, Head Constable, Bengal Police.
- Adolf Friederich, Assistant Engineer, Calcutta Fire Brigade.
- Sonam Wangfel Laden La, Officiating Deputy Superintendent, Bengal Police.
- James Little, Fireman, Calcutta Fire Brigade.
- Robert Henry Sneyd Hutchinson, Superintendent, Indian Police (Bengal).
- The Honourable Mr. Douglas Marshall Straight, Inspector-General, Indian Police (United Provinces).
- Saiyid Amjad Husain, Khan Bahadur, Inspector, United Provinces Police.
- Anwarul-Haqq, Sub-Inspector, United Provinces Police.
- Damodar Singh, Constable, United Provinces Police.
- Munir, Constable, United Provinces Police.
- Fateh Singh, Constable, United Provinces Police.
- Ram Charan, Constable, United Provinces Police.
- Ram Singh, Constable, Punjab Police.
- Douglas Scott Hadow, Superintendent, Indian Police (Punjab).
- Ibrahim Khan, Head Constable, Punjab Police.
- St. George Beaty, Deputy Superintendent, Punjab Police.
- Baggu, Constable, Punjab Police.
- Bobad, Constable, Punjab Police.
- Fraser Woodland Toms, Assistant Superintendent, Indian Police (Punjab).
- Mian Mala Singh, Inspector, Punjab Police.
- Brevet Colonel Solomon Charles Frederick Peile, C.I.E., Indian Army, late Inspector-General, Indian Police (Burma).
- Thomas Austin, Inspector, Burma Police.
- George Edward Litchfield, Deputy Inspector, Burma Police.
- Daim Khan, Constable, Burma Police.
- Indraman Gurung, Havildar, Burma Military Police.
- Sunder Singh, Naik, Burma. Military Police.
- T. C. Orr, late Deputy Inspector-General, Indian Police (Bihar and Orissa).
- Moulvi Nadir Hussein, Rai Bahadur, Deputy Superintendent, Bihar and Orissa Police.
- Edward Copeman, Inspector, Bihar and Orissa Police.
- Iltaf Hussain, Sub-Inspector, Bihar and Orissa Police.
- H. A. Playfair, late Deputy Inspector-General, Indian Police (Central Provinces).
- Shaikh Moti, Circle Inspector, Central Provinces Police.
- Sital Singh, Constable, Central Provinces Police.
- Captain Sir George Duff Sutherland Dunbar, Bart., Commandant, Assam Military Police.
- Captain Alan Moir Graham, Assistant Commandant, Assam Military Police.
- Mohamed Rafiq Khan, Sub-Inspector, North- West Frontier Province Police.
- Sher Ali, Foot Constable, North-West Frontier Province Police.
- Khan Sahib Abad Khan, Superintendent, Criminal Investigation Department, Hyderabad Police.

Colonial Forces

- John C. McRae, late Chief Constable, Winnipeg.
- William Patrick Traynor, Constable, Winnipeg City Police.
- Hugh James Brown, Constable, Winnipeg City Police.
- John Carrigg, Constable, Queensland Police Force.
- Oliver Dimmick, Inspector, Natal Police.
- George Easton, Inspector, Criminal Investigation Department, Capetown:
- Charles John May Bell, Superintendent, Pietermaritzburg Fire Brigade.
- Joseph Burke, Constable Malta Police.
- Arturo. Leone Enriquez, Sergeant, Malta Police.
- George Lawrence Brooks, Commissioner of Police, Sierra Leone.
- Jappar Asjar, Constable, Ceylon Police.
- Captain George Henry Walker, D.S.O., Assistant Commissioner of Police, Southern Nigeria.
- Egbuna, Sergeant, Southern Nigeria. Police.
- Ojo Ijesha, Corporal, Southern Nigeria Police.
- Amadu Ijemo, Constable, Southern Nigeria Police.
- Gunu Gana, Constable, Northern Nigeria Police.
