= Richard Ramsbotham =

English cricketer and British Indian Army officer

Personal information
- Full name: Richard Bury Ramsbotham
- Born: 27 April 1880; Prestwich, Lancashire, England
- Died: 23 September 1970 (aged 90); Woodstock, Oxfordshire, England
- Batting: Unknown
- Relatives: Wilfrid Ramsbotham (cousin)

Domestic team information
- Years: Team
- 1917/18: Europeans

Career statistics
Competition	First-class
Matches	1
Runs scored	24
Batting average	12.00
100s/50s	–/–
Top score	16
Catches/stumpings	1/–
- Source: Cricinfo, 14 November 2021

Richard Bury Ramsbotham MBE (27 April 1880 – 23 September 1970) was an English first-class cricketer, British Indian Army officer and educator.

The son of Philip Bury Ramsbotham and Florence Elizabeth King, he was born at Prestwich in April 1880. He was educated at Shrewsbury School, before going up to Magdalen College, Oxford where he achieved a second in history. From Magdalen he was appointed to the Indian Education Service in June 1908, where he filled a vacant post as an inspector of schools in Eastern Bengal and Assam, alongside James Alexander Richey. A month after his arrival he also took up a teaching post at Dhaka College. He gained his Master of Arts from Magdalen College in 1912, before serving in the First World War as a lieutenant with the British Indian Army, seeing action in Mesopotamia and the North-West Frontier Province. He played first-class cricket during the war, making a single appearance for the Europeans cricket team against the Indians at Madras in January 1918. He batted twice in the match, being dismissed for 8 runs in the Europeans first innings by C. R. Ganapathy, while in their second innings he was dismissed for 16 runs by C. K. Krishnaswamy.

While serving with the 45th Rattray's Sikhs, he was made an acting captain in February 1918, a rank which he relinquished in March 1919 following the end of the war. Ramsbotham was appointed a Member of the Order of the British Empire in the 1919 Birthday Honours. In 1920, he was appointed principal of Hooghly College at Chandannagar, before returning to England to study once more at Magdalen College, where he gained his Bachelor of Letters in 1924.

Returning to India, Ramsbotham was appointed principal of Presidency College Calcutta in 1928, with him later holding the same position at Chittagong College. After the war, Ramsbotham had been a member of the Army of India Reserve of Officers where he reached the rank of major. He resigned his commission in January 1932. He later became pro-vice-chancellor at the Aligarh Muslim University. Ramsbotham died in England in September 1970 at Woodstock, Oxfordshire.
