= Gerard Clauson =

British businessman and orientalist

Sir Gerard Leslie Makins Clauson (28 April 1891 – 1 May 1974) was an English civil servant, businessman, and Orientalist best known for his studies of the Turkic languages. He was born in Malta.

The eldest son of Major Sir John Eugene Clauson, Gerard Clauson attended Eton College, where he was Captain of School, and where, at age 15 or 16, he published a critical edition of a short Pali text, "A New Kammavācā" in the Journal of the Pali Text Society. In 1906, when his father was named Chief Secretary for Cyprus, he taught himself Turkish to complement his school Greek. He studied at Corpus Christi College, Oxford, in classics, receiving his degree in Greats, then became Boden Scholar in Sanskrit, 1911; Hall-Houghtman Syriac Prizeman, 1913; and James Mew Arabic Scholar, 1920. During World War I, he fought in the battle of Gallipoli but spent the majority of his effort in signals intelligence, concerned with German and Ottoman army codes.

These were the years in which the great Central Asian expeditions of Sven Hedin, Sir Aurel Stein and others were unearthing new texts in a variety of languages including Tocharian and Saka (both Khotanese, and Tumshuqese). Clauson actively engaged in unraveling their philologies, as well as Chinese Buddhist texts in the Tibetan script.

Clauson also worked on the Tangut language, and in 1938–1939 wrote a Skeleton dictionary of the Hsi-hsia language. The manuscript copy is held at the School of Oriental and African Studies in London, and was published as a facsimile edition in 2016.

In 1919 he began work in the British Civil Service, which was to culminate in serving as the Assistant Under-Secretary of State in the Colonial Office, 1940–1951, in which capacity he chaired the International Wheat Conference, 1947, and International Rubber Conference, 1951. After his mandatory retirement at age 60, he switched to a business career and in time served as chairman of Pirelli, 1960–1969.

== Archives ==
A partially filled notebook containing Sir Gerard Clauson's Notes on Kashgari's Divan lugat at-Turk and other cognate subjects is held at the Cadbury Research Library, University of Birmingham.

== Selected works ==
- 1962, 2002. Turkish and Mongolian Studies. Royal Asiatic Society of Great Britain and Ireland. Rpt. as Studies in Turkic and Mongolic Linguistics, RoutledgeCurzon. ISBN 0-415-29772-9.
- 1964. "The Future of Tangut (Hsi Hsia) Studies" Asia Major (New Series) volume 11, part 1: 54–77.
- 1972. An Etymological Dictionary of Pre-Thirteenth-Century Turkish. Oxford: Clarendon Press.
- 2016. Gerard Clauson's Skeleton Tangut (Hsi Hsia) Dictionary: A Facsimile Edition. With an introduction by Imre Galambos. With Editorial notes and an Index by Andrew West. Prepared for publication by Michael Everson. Portlaoise: Evertype. ISBN 978-1-78201-167-5.
