= Paolo Vella =

Paolo Vella CMG was a judge of the Court of Appeal of Malta. He was made a Companion of the Order of St Michael and St George in the 1890 Birthday Honours.
