= Henry Leighton Crawford =

British colonial administrator (1855-1931)

The honourable Henry Leighton Crawford CMG
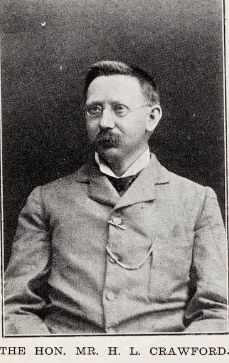
- Born: 16 November 1855; Jerusalem
- Died: 18 February 1931 (aged 75); Worthing
- Education: Corpus Christi College, Cambridge
- Occupation: Colonial administrative service officer
- Years active: 1877–1911
- Children: 4 sons and 1 daughter

Henry Leighton Crawford CMG (16 November 1855 – 18 February 1931) was a British colonial administrator who served his career in Ceylon.

== Early life and education ==
Crawford was born in Jerusalem on 16 November 1855, the son of Rev Henry Crawford of Chelsfield, Kent. He was educated at Clifton College and Corpus Christi College, Cambridge.

== Career ==
Crawford entered the Ceylon civil service as a writer in 1877 attached to the Colombo Kachcheri. In the succeeding six years he served at Kandy, Badulla and Galle Kachcheris, and then as acting magistrate of Kegalla, Balapitiya, Matara, Balapitimodara, Tongalla and Kalpitya. In 1883, he was assistant to the Government Agent of the Western Province, and from 1887 to 1890 was acting District Judge. In 1890, he served as assistant Colonial Secretary and in addition was Secretary of the Central Irrigation Board. From 1894 to 1896, he was acting assistant Colonial Secretary and then confirmed in the appointment.

In 1900, Crawford served as Commissioner under the Buddhist Temporalities Ordinance of 1889. In 1904, he rose to the position of Government Agent of the Southern Province, and in the following year was appointed Government Agent and Treasurer of the Western Province. In 1906, he acted as Colonial Secretary and Treasurer of Ceylon. From 1907 to 1911, he served as Collector of Revenue, Ceylon and put forward proposals for a tax on motor vehicles. He also served as a member of the Executive and Legislative Council of Ceylon. He retired in 1911.

== Personal life and death ==
Crawford married in 1885 and had four sons and a daughter. He was keen on sports and games. He competed several times for Ceylon as an athlete; he was one of the country's best tennis players coming runner-up in the Ceylon Championship; he was for seven years croquet champion of Ceylon; he was for 25 years chess champion while also serving as President of the Colombo Chess Club; represented Ceylon at cricket, and was President of Colombo Cricket Club.

Crawford died on 18 February 1931, aged 75, at Worthing, Sussex.

== Honours ==
Crawford was appointed Companion of the Order of St Michael and St George (CMG) in the 1906 Birthday Honours.
