= Walter Badock =

British civil servant

Sir Walter Badock, KBE, CSI (8 March 1854 – 28 April 1931) was a British civil servant. He served as Accountant-General at the India Office from 1907 to 1919.
