= Sidney Arnold Pakeman =

British soldier, professor and politician (1891–1975)

Hon. Sidney Arnold Pakeman CBE, MC, ED

Member of the Ceylon Parliament for Community (appointed member)
- In office 1947–1952
- Preceded by: seat created

Personal details
- Born: 4 January 1891 Bristol, Gloucestershire, England
- Died: 15 June 1975 (aged 84) Hammersmith, London, England
- Education: Bristol Grammar School, Sidney Sussex College, Cambridge
- Profession: Professor (History)

Colonel Sidney Arnold Pakeman, CBE, MC, ED (4 January 1891 – 15 June 1975) was a British academic and a member of the Parliament of Ceylon.

== Early life and education ==
Sidney Arnold Pakeman was born in Bristol, England on 1 April 1891, the son of Thomas Lovell Pakeman, a draper and undertaker. He attended Bristol Grammar School between 1903 and 1910.

== Military service ==
He served in the British Army in the Wiltshire Regiment 4th Battalion, attached to the Gloucestershire Regiment, during the First World War. On the 18 June 1917 he was awarded the Military Cross as a lieutenant for conspicuous gallantry and devotion to duty. He led his company in the most gallant manner and personally tried to cut gaps in the enemy’s wire. Later, although wounded, he remained at his post during a battle on 6–7 April 1917 at Maissemy, France.

== Academic career ==
He obtained a Master of Arts degree from Sidney Sussex College, Cambridge and joined the Ceylon University College in 1921 serving as lecturer and thereafter Professor of Modern History and Economics until 1942.

== Ceylon Defence Force ==
He joined the Ceylon Defence Force as a volunteer officer in the Ceylon Cadet Battalion. Promoted to Brevet Colonel, he served as the Commanding officer of the Ceylon Cadet Battalion from 1932 to 1938 and was confirmed in the rank of colonel. In the 1937 Coronation Honours he received an OBE (Military Division) for his role as Officer Commanding, Ceylon Cadet Battalion, Ceylon Defence Force.

== Parliament ==
Following Ceylon's first parliamentary elections in 1947, Pakeman was appointed as a member of the Ceylon House of Representatives. He was one of six members appointed by the Governor-General, to represent important interests which were not represented or inadequately represented in the House.

In the 1951 King's Birthday Honours Pakeman was awarded a CBE (Civil Division) for his service as a member of parliament and as a professor at the Ceylon University College.

== Bibliography ==
- Pakeman, S. A. (1931). The Modern World 1789-1931. With Maps and Illustrations. An Aid to the Study of Modern World History. MacMillan and Co.
- Mendis, C. G.; Pakeman, S. A. (1937). Our Heritage. A Ceylon and World History up to 1500. Colombo: Colombo Apothecaries Co.
- Pakeman, S. A. (1964). Ceylon: Nations of the Modern World. New York: Frederick A. Praeger Publishers.
