= John Penry Lewis =

British colonial administrator (1854-1923)

The Honourable John Penry Lewis CMG
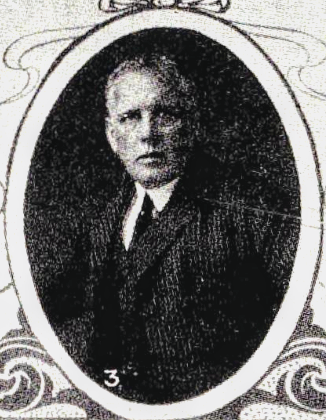
- Born: 17 September 1854
- Died: 29 September 1923 (aged 69); Canford Cliffs, Dorset
- Education: Queen's University of Ireland
- Occupation: Colonial administrator
- Children: 1 son and 2 daughters

John Penry Lewis CMG (17 September 1854 – 29 September 1923) was a British colonial administrator, antiquarian and archaeologist.

== Early life and education ==
Lewis was born on 17 September 1854, the second son of Rev John Lewis of Blackheath, Kent. He was educated at Mill Hill School and Queen's University, Ireland where he received his BA (1876) and MA (1882).

== Career ==
Lewis joined the Ceylon Civil Service in 1877, and then served in various revenue and judicial appointments. From 1897 to 1900, he initiated and administered the newly enacted Waste Land Ordinance. He had to deal with many fictitious claims to Crown Lands, and exposed widespread forgery of land documents which led to prosecutions based on his evidence.

Lewis served as Acting Government Agent of the Northern Province (1903–1906) and Superintendent of Pearl Fisheries (1904–1906). In 1906, he was promoted to the substantive post of Government Agent of the Central Province, and as such was Chairman of the Municipal Council, Kandy; Chairman of the Board of Health, and Chairman of the Road Committee. He was a Justice of the Peace, and also served as a member of both the Executive and Legislative Council of Ceylon. He retired in 1910.

== Publications ==
Lewis is best known for his academic work on the history of Ceylon, having been described as a man: "not greatly interested in administration. His true interests were antiquarian and archaeological". His publications included: Master and Servant Ordinance No. 11 of 1865 (1883); Manual of the Vaṇṇi Districts, Vavun̤iya and Mullaittívu, of the Northern Province, Ceylon (1895); List of inscriptions on tombstones and monuments in Ceylon (1913); The Ceylon antiquary and literary register (1915); Ceylon in early British times (1916). He also wrote many papers for journals on the archaeology and folklore of Ceylon, and was a regular contributor to the Journal of the Royal Asiatic Society, while also serving as vice-president of its branch in Ceylon.

== Personal life and death ==
Lewis married Violet Anderson in 1894, and they had one son and two daughters.

Lewis died on 29 September 1923 at Canford Cliffs, Dorset, England.

== Honours ==
Lewis was appointed Companion of the Order of St Michael and St George (CMG) in the 1911 New Year Honours.
