= William Henry Griffin =

Canadian civil servant

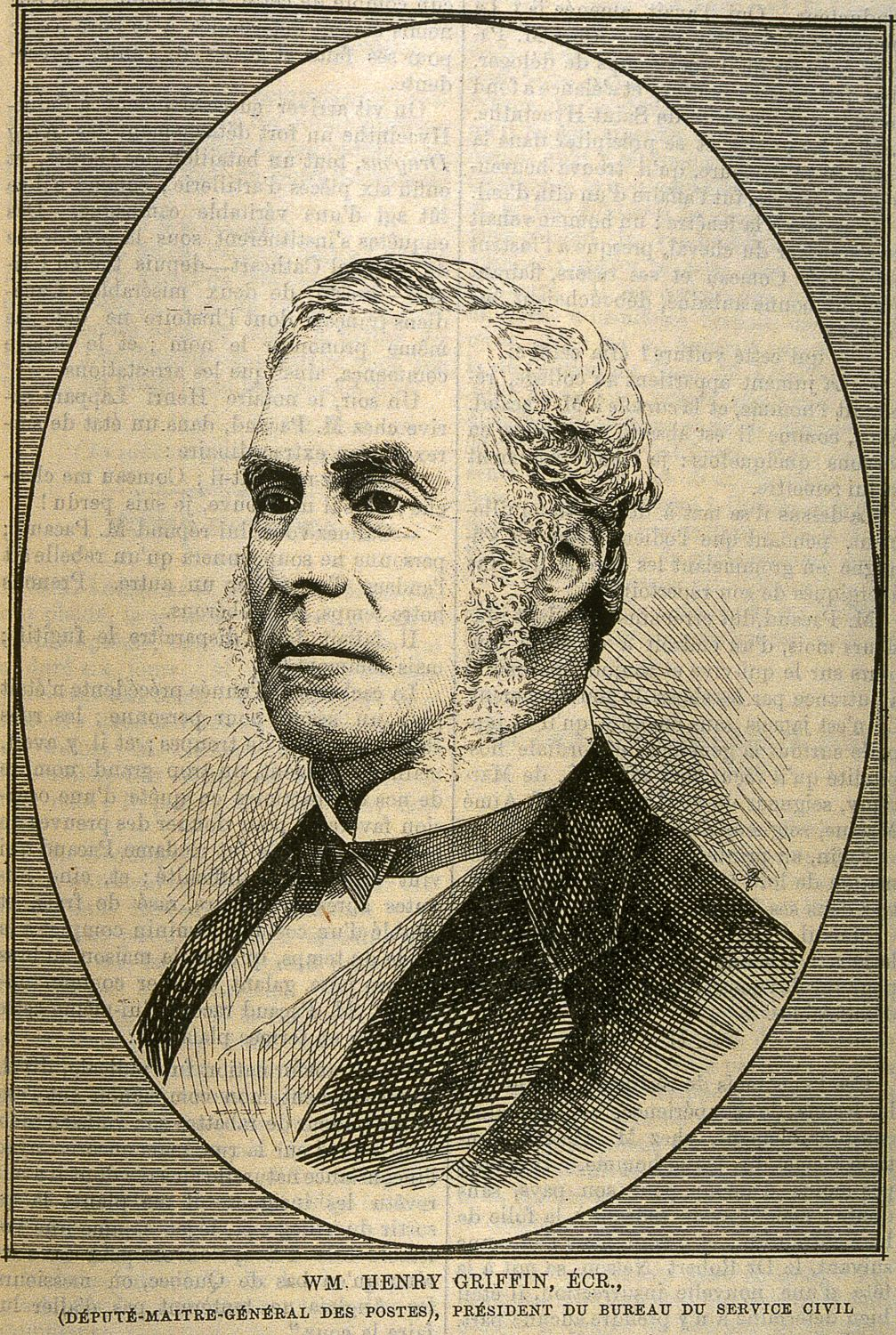
Illustration of William Henry Griffin published in 1879

William Henry Griffin, CMG (7 August 1812 – 4 November 1900) was a Canadian civil servant. One of the longest-serving members of the Canadian public service, he worked in the Post Office Department for 57 years from 1831 to 1888, raising to the rank of Deputy Postmaster General.
