= Gerald Henry Cooray =

Sri Lankan pathologist

Gerald Henry Cooray, OBE, FRCP (3 October 1908 – 27 February 1970) was a Sri Lankan pathologist. He was the president of the Ceylon Medical Association and Professor of Pathology at the University of Ceylon.

Born in Panadura, Ceylon to Henry Cooray, a government medical officer and Pusethi Sudhira, daughter of Charles Frederick Sudhira Jayawickrema, an interpreter in the law courts. He was educated at Royal College, Colombo and studied medicine at the King's College Hospital, where he qualified with the Conjoint in 1932 and gained a MBBS the year after. On his return, he joined the Department of Health. In 1946, he joined the University of Ceylon as a lecturer in Pathology. He gained his MD (London) by thesis, winning the Gold Medal in Pathology, the first and only Ceylonese to do so. In 1953, he was appointed Professor of Pathology succeeding Professor W. A. E. Karunaratne. He was appointed a Member of the Order of the British Empire (MBE) in the 1951 New Year Honours and an Officer of the Order of the British Empire (OBE) in the 1956 New Year Honours. In 1960, he was awarded the MRCP for his published work and elected FRCP in 1966. He served as president of the Ceylon Medical Association, Ceylon Association for the Advancement of Science and the Ceylon Cancer Society. He was a member of WHO Expert Advisory Panels on Cancer Diagnosis and Control.

In 1937 he married Mallika Leelawathie, daughter of Arthur Vincent Dias, a planter. They had one son and two daughters.
