= Hendala Leprosy Hospital =

Geography
- Location: Hendala, Sri Lanka
- Coordinates: 6.982523824604779°N 79.87694083384777°E

Organisation
- Type: Leprosy hospital

History
- Founded: 1708

Hendala Leprosy Hospital, established in 1708, is considered one of the oldest leprosy hospitals in South Asia. It is in Hendala, Wattala, Sri Lanka. This historic institution has served patients for centuries. It is considered to be Asia's first leprosy hospital, and is also believed to be the oldest functioning hospital in the world.

== Foundation and history ==
The hospital was founded while Sri Lanka was under Dutch colonial rule. It is believed that this is the first hospital in Sri Lanka to be established by foreign rulers. At the time, leprosy was not well understood; those afflicted with it were often isolated from society to receive medical treatment.

In 1964, the Ceylonese government took over the hospital. For the past 70 years the Missionary Sisters of the St Francis Leprosy Guild have funded and helped support the hospital; they also visit the patients regularly.

Throughout its long and storied history, Hendala Leprosy Hospital has collected some antique items. Among these are two handcrafted carts, skillfully made by the hospital's inmates. These carts held a poignant purpose, as they were used to transport the deceased to the cemetery, with one cart dedicated to Buddhists and the other to Catholics, reflecting the hospital's respect for different cultural traditions.

Another noteworthy piece in their collection is a washing machine with a proud British heritage, branded as 'Thomas' and believed to have been manufactured in 1934. This machine is believed to be the first of its kind in Sri Lanka.

== Modern day ==
The hospital has now been restored and transformed into a hospital museum by the Ministry of Health.

The Ministry of Health designated Hendala Leprosy Hospital as the country's first quarantine centre in March 2020.
