= John George Fraser =

British colonial administrator (1864–1941)

Sir John George Fraser CMG (1864 – 21 July 1941) was a British colonial administrator who served in British Ceylon.

== Early life and education ==
Fraser was born in 1864, the son of Alexander Fraser, Controller of Revenue, Scotland. He was educated at Edinburgh Institution for Languages and Mathematics and University of Edinburgh.

== Career ==
Fraser joined the Ceylon Civil Service as a cadet in 1887. During the 1915 Ceylon riots he was appointed Special Commissioner of Western Province to coordinate government action against the rioters, and issued a proclamation to establish an enquiry into the disturbances. After serving as Government Agent, Western Province he retired in 1923.

== Personal life and death ==
Fraser married Angela Wallis in 1888 and they had a daughter.

Fraser died on 21 July 1941.

== Honours ==
Fraser was appointed Companion of the Order of St Michael and St George (CMG) in the 1913 New Year Honours. He was created a Knight Bachelor in the 1924 New Year Honours.
