= Richard Frederick Crawford =

Sir Richard Frederick Crawford, GCMG, KBE (18 June 1863 – 6 August 1919) was a British public servant.

Crawford was a Commissioner of Customs from 1904 to 1911. He was later Commercial Adviser to His Majesty's Embassy at Washington, achieving the rank of Minister Plenipotentiary in the Diplomatic Service. He was appointed KCMG in 1911, KBE in 1917, and GCMG in 1919. He was also an adviser to the Turkish Minister of Finance.

Crawford married Augusta Marion L'Estrange, only daughter of Lieutenant-Colonel A. A. D. L'Estrange, in 1894. Lady Crawford died in 1961.
