= William Leworthy Goode Drew =

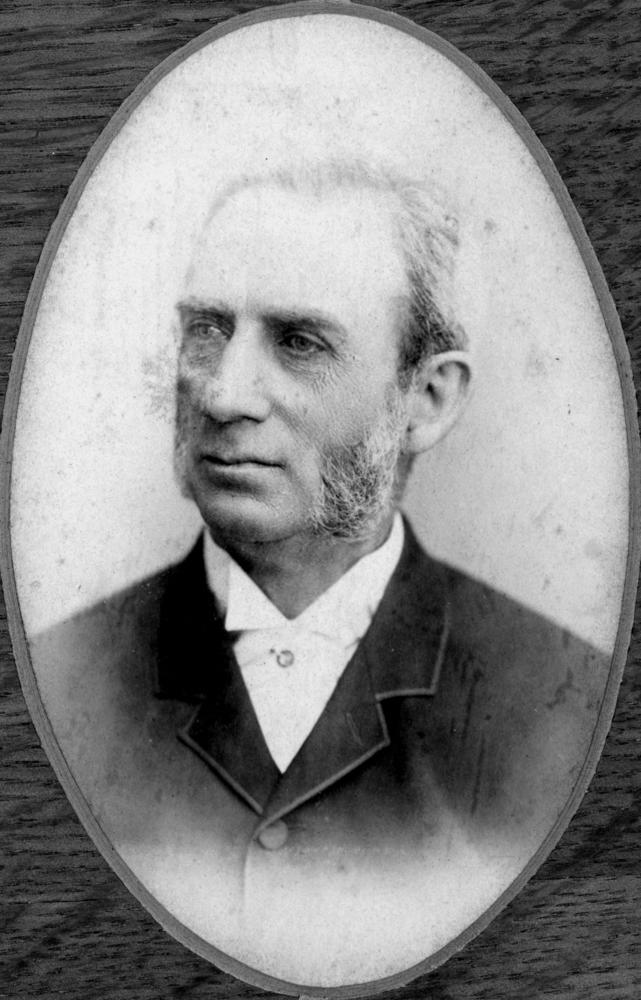

William Leworthy Goode Drew, CMG, (14 October 1826 – 14 July 1898) was an English-born auditor-general in colonial Queensland (a state of Australia since 1901).

Drew was born in Broadstairs, Kent, England, to Capt. George Drew, RN and Caroline Fulford née Goode. George served during the Napoleonic Wars and ended up as Superintendent at the Invalid Convict Station in Impression Bay, Tasmania.

William was educated at the Blue Coat School and graduated from there to the Royal Navy at the age of 16. His final posting was Fleet Paymaster on the Australia/New Zealand stations at Sydney in 1853. On 30 January 1855 married Gertrude Jane Hely, daughter of Frederick Augustus Hely who had arrived in New South Wales as Superintendent of Convicts on the S.S. "Isabella" in 1823. After his payoff from the Royal Navy in 1856 he became a clerk in the NSW Railway Department in 1857 and within a few months was Secretary of the Steam Navigation Board. In 1858 he joined the Union Bank of Australia,; but his health failing he engaged in country pursuits. They moved to Brisbane, Queensland, and in 1862 was appointed Under Secretary of the Queensland Treasury.

In October 1877 he was appointed Auditor-General of Queensland. He was a prominent citizen with a home "Minto" and estate at Toowong. He also served as Chairman of the local Road Trust, and as early trustee of St. Thomas' Church of England, among other things. J. B. Fewings wrote praising his "varied experience, his uniform temper, courteous manner, tact and influence, strong individuality, knowledge of human nature, discretion and sound judgement, extensive information, and ability to conceal want of knowledge on any subject." The choice of Drew as Queensland's third Auditor-General was regarded as a coup for the Treasury, creating the audit office as a subordinate department in all but name.

Upon his retirement from the Treasury he was appointed Chairman of the new Civil Service Board in November 1889. The Premier of the day, introduced a "Drew Pension Bill" which allowed Drew to receive £1000 yearly salary and also allowed him to draw £250 of the £540 retirement allowance he was entitled to on retirement as Auditor General, and so the "Drew Pension Act of 1889 (53 Vic no. 13) came into being. He continued to serve the Government and the Queensland people until his death on 14 July 1898 at Toowong, Queensland. The Brisbane Courier wrote in its tribute that "Drew was warmly esteemed. He was kind but was termed a strong man, somewhat reserved with strangers."
