= James Maxwell (colonial administrator) =

British physician and colonial administrator (1869-1932)

Sir James Crawford Maxwell, KCMG, KBE (1869 – 1932) was a British physician and colonial administrator.

== Biography ==
Maxwell was born in Dundee, Scotland in 1869. He was educated at the High School of Dundee, before studying medicine at the University of Edinburgh, graduating M.B., C.M. in 1893, and proceeding M.D. in 1896. He was House-Surgeon at Halifax Infirmary for a brief period before becoming a district medical officer in Sierra Leone between 1897 and 1900. He was awarded the West Africa Medal and a clasp for his role in the Hut Tax War of 1898.

In 1900, he moved into political service and served first as a district commissioner in Sierra Leone. He was awarded the CMG in the 1911 New Year Honours. Between 1914 and 1920 he served as First Class Resident in Nigeria. He thereafter returned to Sierra Leone as Colonial Secretary, before being promoted to a similar role in the Gold Coast.

In 1927 he was appointed Governor and Commander in Chief of Northern Rhodesia. He was appointed a Knight Commander of the Order of the British Empire (KBE) in the 1925 Birthday Honours and promoted to Knight Commander of the Order of St Michael and St George (KCMG) in the 1930 New Year Honours.

He was married to Mabel Ann nee Davies; they had no children.

He retired in 1932 and died on 16 November 1932 aged 63 on the SS Oronsay in the Atlantic whilst on voyage to Australia.
