= 1906 Birthday Honours =

National awards given by King Edward VII

The 1906 Birthday Honours for the British Empire were announced on 29 June, to celebrate the birthday of Edward VII on 9 November.

The recipients of honours are displayed here as they were styled before their new honour, and arranged by honour, with classes (Knight, Knight Grand Cross, etc.) and then divisions (Military, Civil, etc.) as appropriate.

== The Most Honourable Order of the Bath ==
=== Knight Grand Cross of the Order of the Bath (GCB) ===
Military Division

- Admiral Sir Harry Holdsworth Rawson, K.C.B.
- Lieutenant-General Sir William Francis Butler, K.C.B.
- Lieutenant-General Sir John Withers McQueen, K.C.B., Indian Army.
- Lieutenant-General and Honorary General Sir Julius Augustus Robert Raines, K.C.B., Colonel, The Buffs (East Kent Regiment).

Civil Division

- His Excellency General Porfirio Díaz, President of the United States of Mexico. (Honorary)
- Thomas, Baron Brassey, K.C.B.
- Sir Kenelm Edward Digby, K.C.B.
- Sir Edward Walter Hamilton, K.C.B.

=== Knight Commander of the Order of the Bath (KCB) ===
Military Division

- Vice-Admiral Sir William Henry May, K.C.V.O.
- Lieutenant-General James Robertson Steadman Sayer, C.B., Colonel, 1st (King's) Dragoon Guards.
- Major-General and Honorary Lieutenant-General Fiennes Middleton Colvile, C.B.
- Honorary Major-General Thomas Maunsell, C.B., retired pay.
- General Edward Francis Chapman, C.B., Colonel Commandant, Royal (late Bengal) Artillery.
- Lieutenant-General Gordon Douglas Pritchard, C.B., Colonel Commandant, Royal Engineers.
- Deputy Surgeon-General John McNeale Donnelly, C.B., retired pay, late Indian Medical Service.
- General Horace Searle Anderson, C.B., Indian Army.
- Major-General Alliston Champion Toker, C.B., Indian Army.
- Lieutenant-General William Terence Shone, C.B., D.S.O., Royal Engineers.
- Major-General Herbert Charles Onslow Plumer, C.B., commanding 17th Division.
- Surgeon-General (ranking as Lieutenant-General) Alfred Keogh, C.B., Director General, Army Medical Service.
- General John Fletcher Owen, C.B., Colonel Commandant, Royal Artillery.
- General John Hart Dunne, Colonel, The Duke of Edinburgh's (Wiltshire Regiment).
- Major-General and Honorary Lieutenant-General Henry Francis Williams, Colonel Commandant, The King's Royal Rifle Corps.

Civil Division

- Colonel Edward Raban, C.B., Royal Engineers.
- Mr. George William Hervey, C.B.

=== Companion of the Order of the Bath (CB) ===
Military Division

- Surgeon-General William Simson Pratt, Army Medical, Staff, Principal Medical Officer, Southern Command.
- Honorary Major-General Luke O'Connor, V.C., retired pay, late Royal Welsh Fusiliers.
- Colonel (Brigadier-General) Herbert Napier Bunbury (late Army Service Corps), Brigadier-General in charge of Administration, Gibraltar.
- Colonel (temporary Major-General) Sir Charles Sim Bremridge Parsons, K.C.M.G., (late Royal Artillery) Colonel on the Staff commanding Regular Forces, Dominion of Canada.
- Colonel James Latimer Crawshay St. Clair, C.M.G. (late Argyll and Sutherland Highlanders) Deputy Judge Advocate, London.
- Lieutenant-Colonel and Brevet Colonel Francis Stevenson, Indian Army.
- Colonel William Francis Henry Style Kincaid (late Royal Engineers) Assistant Quartermaster-General, Administrative Staff, Aldershot Army Corps.
- Lieutenant-Colonel and Brevet Colonel Gilbert Henry Claude Hamilton, half.-pay, late 14th Hussars.
- Colonel William Henry Muir Lowe (late 7th Dragoon Guards), Colonel in charge of Cavalry Records (also Staff Officer for Imperial Yeomanry), Northern Command.
- Colonel (Brigadier-General) Cecil William Park, A.D.C. (late Devonshire Regiment), Brigade Commander, India.
- Colonel (Brigadier-General) William Pitcairn Campbell, A.D.C. (late King's Royal Rifle Corps), Brigadier-General, 5th Brigade, 3rd Division, Aldershot Army Corps.
- Colonel (Brigadier-General) The Honourable Julian Heldworth George Byng, M.V.O. (late 10th Hussars), Brigadier-General, 2nd Cavalry Brigade, Eastern Command.
- Colonel Hugh Frederick Lyons-Montgomery, Indian Army.
- Colonel (Brigadier-General) Hubert Ion Wetherall Hamilton, D.S.O., A.D.O. (late Royal West Surrey Regiment), Brigadier-General, 7th Brigade, Southern Command.
- Lieutenant-Colonel and Brevet Colonel John Monteith, Indian Army.
- Colonel Malcolm Henry Stanley Grover, Indian Army Brigade Commander (Colonel on the Staff), India.
- Colonel Philip Thomas Buston, D.S.O., Chief Engineer, Aldershot Army Corps.
- Colonel Charles Carmichael Monro (late Royal West Surrey. Regiment), Commandant, School of Musketry.
- Colonel Claude de Courcy Hamilton (late Royal Artillery), Assistant Adjutant-General, Headquarters, India.
- Colonel Cecil Frederick Nevil Macready (late Gordon Highlanders), Assistant Quartermaster-General, Cape Colony District, South Africa.
- Colonel Edward Sinclair May, C.M.G. (late Royal Artillery), Assistant Director of Military Training, Headquarters.
- Lieutenant-Colonel and Brevet Colonel Edward Spence Hastings, D.S.O., Indian Army.
- Lieutenant-Colonel and Brevet Colonel Herbert Conyers Surtees, M.V.O., D.S.O. (late Coldstream Guards), Military Attache, Constantinople and Athens.
- Colonel Arthur Phayre, Indian Army, Brigade Commander (Colonel on the Staff), India.
- Lieutenant-Colonel and Brevet Colonel The Honourable Edward James Montagu-Stuart-Wortley, C.M.G.. M.V.O., D.S.O., half-pay, late King's Royal Rifle Corps.
- Lieutenant-Colonel and Brevet Colonel Courtenay Bourchier Vyvyan, The Buffs (East Kent Regiment).
- Colonel Henry Kellock McKay, C.I.E., Indian Medical Service.
- Colonel Joshua Arthur Nunn, C.I.E., D.S.O., Army Veterinary Staff, Principal Veterinary Officer, South Africa.
- Honorary Colonel John Bouham, retired pay, Royal (late Bengal) Artillery.

Civil Division

- Engineer Rear-Admiral Henry John Oram.
- Colonel Hugh de Grey, Marquis of Hertford, A.D.C., Honorary Colonel, Warwickshire Imperial Yeomanry.
- Lieutenant-Colonel and Honorary Colonel John Staples Irwin, The Mid-Ulster Royal Garrison Artillery (Militia).
- Lieutenant-Colonel Edmund Garrett, Lieutenant-Colonel Commandant, 1st Essex Royal Garrison Artillery (Volunteers).
- John Ardron, Esq.
- William Blain, Esq,
- William Frederick Bailey, Esq.
- Reginald Herbert Brade, Esq.
- James Miller Dodds, Esq.

== Order of Merit ==
- Evelyn, Earl of Cromer, G.C.B., G.C.M.G., K.C.S.I, C.I.E.

== Order of the Star of India ==
=== Companion of the Order of the Star of India (CSI) ===
- Elliot Graham Colvin, Esq., Indian Civil Service, Agent to the Governor-General in Rajputana and Chief Commissioner of Ajmer-Merwara.
- Leslie Alexander Selim Porter, Esq., Indian Civil Service, Commissioner, Lucknow Division, and an Additional Member of the Council of the Governor-General for making Laws and Regulations.
- John Lewis Jenkins, Esq., Indian Civil Service, Commissioner of Customs, Salt, Opium, and Abkari, and Reporter-General of External Commerce, Bombay, and an Additional Member of the Council of the Governor of Bombay for making Laws and Regulations.
- Lieutenant-Colonel Willoughby Pitcairn Kennedy, Indian Army, lately Agent to the Governor of Bombay, Kathiawar.
- Sardar Bahadur Gurmukh Singh, President of the Council of Regency in the Patiala State.

== Order of Saint Michael and Saint George ==
=== Knight Grand Cross of the Order of St Michael and St George (GCMG) ===
- Sir John Madden, LL.D., K.C.M.G., Lieutenant-Governor and Chief Justice of the Supreme Court of Victoria.

=== Knight Commander of the Order of St Michael and St George (KCMG) ===
- The Right Honourable Lord Chelmsford, Governor of the State of Queensland.
- Riccardo Micallef, Esq., C.M.G., Comptroller of Charitable Institutions in the Island of Malta.
- William Matthews, Esq.. C.M.G., a Vice-President of the Institution of Civil Engineers; for services in connection with Harbour Works in certain Colonies.
- His Excellency the Right Honourable Sir Maurice William Ernest de Bunsen, G.C.V.O., C.B., His Majesty's Ambassador Extraordinary and Plenipotentiary at Madrid.
- Cecil Arthur Spring Rice, Esq., Councillor of Embassy in His Majesty's Diplomatic Service.
- Lieutenant-Colonel Henry Trotter, C.B., Royal Engineers, His Majesty's Consul-General for the Kingdom of Roumania.

=== Companion of the Order of St Michael and St George (CMG) ===
- The Honourable Thomas Watt, Minister of Justice and Defence of the Colony of Natal.
- The Honourable Adélard Turgeon, Minister of Lands and Forests of the Province of Quebec, in the Dominion of Canada.
- William Lyon Mackenzie King, Esq., M.A., LL.B., Deputy Minister of Labour of the Dominion of Canada.
- Hugh Clarence Bourne, Esq., M.A., Colonial Secretary of the Island of Jamaica.
- Brevet Major Herbert Bryan, Colonial Secretary of the Gold Coast Colony.
- Francis Charles Bernard Dudley Fuller, Esq., Chief Commissioner of Ashanti.
- Henry Leighton Crawford, Esq., Government Agent, Southern Province, Island of Ceylon.
- Lieutenant-Colonel and Brevet Colonel Louis Charles Jackson, Royal Engineers, for services on the Anglo-German Commission for defining the Boundary between Yola and Lake Chad.
- Lieutenant-Colonel and Brevet Colonel Henry David Laffan, Royal Engineers, for services on the Anglo-German South West Africa Boundary Commission.
- Alfred William Howitt, Esq., late Commissioner of Audit and Member of the Public Service Board of the State of Victoria.
- Charles Richard Swayne, Esq., late Stipendiary Magistrate, Rewa, and Commissioner, Naitasiri, in the Colony of Fiji.
- Joseph William Gullick, Esq., Superintendent, Colonial Audit Branch, Exchequer and Audit Department.
- Captain Percy Wilfrid Machell, Adviser to the Egyptian Ministry of the Interior.
- Lieutenant-Colonel Edgar Edwin Bernard, Financial Secretary to the Soudan Government.
- Lieutenant-Colonel and Brevet Colonel John Gerald Panton, the Royal Sussex Regiment, in command of the British Troops in Crete.
- Esme William Howard, Esq., M.V.O., His Majesty's Consul-General for the Island of Crete.
- George Joshua Stanley, Esq., Principal Clerk, Board of Trade.
- His Highness Suleiman bin Almerhum Raja Musa, Sultan of Selangor. (Honorary)
- His Highness Mohamadu Attuhiru, Sultan of Sokoto. (Honorary)
- Monsieur Gabriel Angoulvant, Governor of the French Colony of St. Pierre. (Honorary)

== Order of the Indian Empire ==
=== Knight Commander of the Order of the Indian Empire (KCIE) ===
- General Donald James Sim McLeod, C.B., D.S.O., Indian Army, lately commanding the Burma Division.
- Maharaja Bhagwati Prasad Singh of Balrampur in Oudh.

=== Companion of the Order of the Indian Empire (CIE) ===
- Lieutenant-Colonel David Prain, M.B., Indian Medical Service, Director of the Botanical Survey of India, Superintendent, Royal Botanical Gardens, and Government Quinologist, Calcutta.
- Sir James Houssemayne Du Boulay Esq., Indian Civil Service, Private Secretary to His Excellency the Governor of Bombay.
- James Douglas, Esq., Agent of the East Indian Railway Company.
- Major William John Daniell Dundee, Royal Engineers, Assistant Commanding, Royal Engineers, Peshawar.
- Brian Egerton, Esq., Tutor to Sahibzada Mir Usman Ali Khan, son of His Highness the Nizam.
- Honorary Lieutenant Malik Umar Khan, Tiwana, of Kalra, in the Shahpur District, 18th (Prince of Wales's Own) Tiwana Lancers, a Member of the Council of the Lieutenant-Governor of the Punjab for making Laws and Regulations.

== Royal Victorian Order ==
=== Knight Commander of the Royal Victorian Order (KCVO) ===
- George Charles Vincent Holmes, Esq., C.V.O., C.B., Chairman of the Board of Public Works, Ireland.
- Edward Richard Henry Esq., C.V.O., C.S.I., Commissioner of the Metropolitan Police.

=== Commander of the Royal Victorian Order (CVO) ===
- The Right Reverend Bishop John Taylor Smith, D.D., Chaplain General to the Forces.
- Colonel Douglas Frederick Rawdon Dawson, C.M.G;, Master of the Ceremonies to His Majesty The King.

=== Member of the Royal Victorian Order, 5th class (MVO) ===
- Arthur Isaac Durrant, Esq., Secretary., to the Osborne Advisory Committee.

== Imperial Service Order ==
- The Right Honourable Sir Charles Hardinge, G.C.V.O., G.C.M.G., C.B., Permanent Under Secretary of State, Foreign Office.
- James William Fairbridge Bird, Esq., Secretary, Law Department, Colony of Natal.
- Frederick Brown, Esq., Principal Clerk, Controller's Department, Admiralty.
- William Sperling Christoffelsz, Esq:, Principal Clerk of the Executive and Legislative Branch of the Secretariat, Island of Ceylon.
- William Clarke, Esq., Governor of Duke Street Prison, Glasgow.
- Herbert Minton Crundall; Esq., F.R.S., Senior Keeper of the Victoria and Albert Museum.
- William, Henry Deering, Esq., Chemist to the War Department.
- Edward Dynham, Esq., Principal Clerk, National Debt Office.
- Robert Fairbairn, Esq., Resident Resident Magistrate, Fremantle, in the State of Western Australia.
- George Levack Bower Fraser, Esq., K.C. Chief Clerk, Department of Justice, Dominion of Canada.
- David Gloster Garraway, Esq., Comptroller, Customs Department. Colony of British Guiana.
- James Francis Homagee, Esq., Crown Prosecutor and Clerk of the Peace, Island of Saint Helena.
- Albemarle Percy Inglis, Esq., Consul-General, Paris.
- J. Whitfield Jackson, Esq., Principal Clerk, Paymaster-General's Office.
- Louis Kossuth Jones, Esq., Secretary, Department of Railways and Canals. Dominion of Canada.
- John Kelly, Esq., Secretary and Assistant Registrar, General Register Office, Ireland.
- Juchereau de Saint-Denis Le Moine, Esq., Sergeant-at-Arms, Senate of the Dominion of Canada.
- Nicholas Colston Lockyer, Esq., Collector of Customs for the State of New South Wales.
- Thomas Long, Esq., Deputy Minister, Department of Agriculture and Mines of the Colony of Newfoundland.
- Cornewall Lewis Warwickshire Mansergh Esq., Secretary for Public Works, Colony of the Cape of Good Hope.
- Alfred John May, Esq., lately Second Master of Queen's College, Colony of Hong Kong.
- Henry William Meakin, Esq., Under Treasurer of the State of Victoria.
- Alfred Henry Miles, Esq., Collector-General, Revenue Department, Island of Jamaica.
- C. O. Minchin, Esq., Chief Clerk, Estate Duty Office.
- Frederick William Neitenstein, Esq., Comptroller-General of Prisons of the State of New South Wales.
- Joseph Pope, Esq., C.M.G., Under Secretary of State and Deputy Registrar-General of the Dominion of Canada.
- Robert Robson, Esq., Collector of Customs, Port of London.
- Philip Samuel Seager, Esq., Registrar of the Supreme Court of the State of Tasmania.
- Bernard Senior, Esq., Auditor-General of the Orange River Colony.
- Allan Frith Smith, Esq., Colonial Postmaster, of the Bermuda Islands.
- Edward Davenport Sutherland, Esq., Assistant Auditor-General of the Dominion of Canada.
- William Henry Whyham, Esq., District Magistrate, Island of Antigua.
- Joseph William Willmot, Esq., Controller of Factories, General Post Office.
- Uriah John Wright, Esq., Surveyor of Prisons, Home Office.
