= Cissy Cooray =

Ceylonese social worker and politician

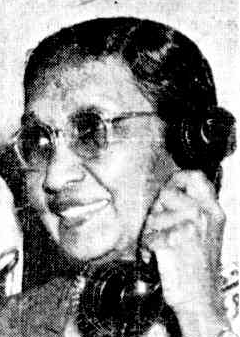
- Cissy Cooray, from a 1952 Australian newspaper.
- Born: 8 June 1889
- Died: 6 November 1965 (aged 76)
- Known for: First woman to be appointed to the Senate of Ceylon (1948)

Cissy Cooray, OBE (8 June 1889 – 6 November 1965) was a Ceylonese social worker and the first woman to be appointed to the Senate of Ceylon.

== Career ==
Cooray was a co-founder of the Lanka Mahila Samitiya in 1931, which has since become the country's largest women's voluntary organisation; she was a member for 35 years and the president for ten years between 1943 and 1953. She was considered a pioneer in the field of maternal and child health in Ceylon.

In 1937, Cooray hosted Australian clubwoman Isobel Ritchie, on a visit to see the work of the Social Service League of Colombo. In 1941 she was appointed as an Officer of the Order of the British Empire, for her work in social welfare services in Ceylon. Cooray was also active in the Ceylon Social Service League and the Girl Guide movement. She served a term as president of the All-Ceylon Women's Buddhist Congress.

In 1947 Cooray was appointed as a member of the Senate of Ceylon, a position she retained until 1952. While in the legislature, she worked for improvements in the food supply and in hospital care, including nurse education in rural areas. "Our island is rich, our people are gay and carefree, but we cannot progress until we wipe out illiteracy and ignorance and disease," she declared in 1951.

In 1950 Cooray attended an international women's conference in Denmark. In 1952, she traveled to Christchurch, New Zealand, for the Pan-Pacific Women's Conference, and with social worker Helen Wickremasinghe to Melbourne, Australia, for a professional seminar on social welfare.

== Personal life ==
Cooray died on 6 November 1965, at the age of 76. In 1969, the Senior Citizens Home at the Sri Lankadhara Society was opened in her memory.
