= Ernest Peter Arnold Fernando =

Sir Ernest Peter Arnold Fernando, CBE (7 February 1904 - 3 December 1956) was a Ceylonese businessman and mine owner. He was the owner of the Bogala Graphite Mine, one of the largest graphite mines in Ceylon. A patron of the arts, he gifted the building to establish the first school of national dance, the Kalayathanaya by Chitrasena.

Ernest Peter Arnold Fernando was born on 7 February 1904, the second son of Merenyagé Arnolis Fernando, a graphite mine owner. He founded the Carlton Club Moratuwa, a tennis and social club, on 23 September 1923. In 1927 he married Gymara Wickramasooriya (?-2004), daughter of Jandoris Wickramasooriya and Celestina de Silva. They had a daughter, Sirane (?-2009), who married T. Gamini Perera. Fernando was appointed a Commanders of the Order of the British Empire (CBE) in the 1954 Birthday Honours and was knighted as a Knight Bachelor in the 1955 Birthday Honours for public services. Sir Ernest Fernando Trophy is annually awarded by the Royal Colombo Golf Club. His nephew, Gerald Wickremasooriya was responsible for setting up the first major Sri Lankan music label, Sooriya Records.
