= James Alexander Richey =

British educational administrator

James Alexander Richey CIE (8 March 1874 – 24 October 1931) was a British educational administrator in Cape Colony, Transvaal Colony and British India.

The son of Sir James Bellet Richey, an administrator in Bombay, he was educated at Elstree School, Rugby School and Balliol College, Oxford, where he read Classics. His first post was as a lecturer at the Diocesan College, Rondebosch, Cape Colony. In 1902 he transferred to the Transvaal Education Department.

In 1908 he was posted to the Indian Education Service, where he remained for the rest of his career. He served as an Inspector of Schools and Assistant Director of Public Instruction in Eastern Bengal and Assam, alongside Richard Ramsbotham, until he was appointed Director of Public Instruction of the North-West Frontier Province in 1911. In 1917 he was transferred to the same post in the Punjab. In 1920, he was appointed Educational Commissioner of the Government of India. In these posts he introduced many educational reforms designed to increase literacy among the Indian peasantry. He retired in 1929.

He was appointed Companion of the Order of the Indian Empire (CIE) in the 1920 New Year Honours.

Richey had suffered from ill-health since his youth and died at the age of 57 after an illness of a few months.
