= Lionel Davidson (civil servant) =

Indian civil servant

Sir Lionel Davidson, KCSI (19 January 1868 – 17 September 1944) was an Indian civil servant who served as a member of the Executive Council of the Governor of Madras.

== Early life ==
Lionel Davidson was born on 19 January 1868, the son of William Davidson. He was educated at Balliol College, Oxford and joined the Indian Civil Service in 1888.,

== Career ==
Davidson remained in England in order to obtain his Honours' degree at Oxford, and arrived in India only in 1889. He was appointed an Assistant Collector and Magistrate in July 1890, and as Assistant Secretary at the Chief Secretariat in 1893. In 1895, he was appointed Special Assistant Collector, magistrate and government agent for the Godavari district and the next year, Under-Secretary to the Government.

Davidson served as Acting Secretary to the Commissioner of Land Revenue from 1898 to 1902 and as Commissioner of Coorg from 1902 to 1905. In 1908 he was appointed Acting Resident, Travancore and Cochin, and was appointed Secretary to the Madras government in July 1913.
