= Nandasara Wijetilaka Atukorala =

Ceylonese civil servant

Nandasara Wijetilaka Atukorala, CMG, CBE (15 August 1915 – ?) was a Ceylonese civil servant. He was the Permanent Secretary to the Governor General of Ceylon and Prime Minister of Ceylon.

Having graduated with a BSc from the University of London, Atukorala worked as an assistant demonstrator at the Ceylon University College from 1937 to 1938. He joined public service in 1938, when he was appointed assistant settlement officer by the Governor. From December 1938 to December 1941 he served as assistant rubber controller. He was appointed secretary to the Minister for Agriculture and Lands in December 1941 and was appointed to act as Private secretary to the prime minister of Ceylon in September 1947. In Oct 1947 he was seconded as Secretary to the prime minister for overseas duty. He was formally appointed as Secretary to the prime minister in October 1950 by the Public Service Commission. In 1953, he served Additional Secretary Governor General while attending the Coronation of Elizabeth II. He was thereafter appointed Secretary to the Governor General of Ceylon in October 1953.

He was appointed a Commander of the Order of the British Empire in the 1951 Birthday Honours and a Companion of the Order of St Michael and St George in the 1955 New Year Honours.
