= James Bellett Richey =

British administrator

Sir James Bellett Richey KCIE, CSI
- Born: 1834
- Died: 27 June 1902 (aged 67–68); London, England
- Education: Exeter College, Oxford
- Occupation: administrator
- Known for: Bombay Presidency
- Spouse: Blanche Perkins (m. 1872)
- Children: James Alexander Richey
- Parents: Rev. James Richey (father); Elizabeth Bellett (mother)

Sir James Bellet Richey, KCIE, CSI (1834 – 27 June 1902) was a British administrator in Bombay Presidency.

== Biography ==
Richey was born in 1834, the son of Rev. James Richey, rector of Nympton St. George, Devonshire, by his wife Elizabeth Bellett, daughter of J. Bellett, of Sampford Arundel, Somerset. He was educated at Exeter College, Oxford, and joined the Bombay Civil Service in 1856. After serving in various capacities in the service until 1879, he was that year appointed junior collector and magistrate at Ahmednagar district, advancing to senior collector the following year. In 1885 he became chief secretary to the Government of Bombay, covering the political, secret, judicial, educational and separate departments. He was nominated an acting member of the Council of the Governor in 1886, and confirmed as such the following year, when he was also appointed a Companion of the Order of the Star of India (CSI). He retired from the service in 1890, and was created a Knight Commander of the Order of the Indian Empire (KCIE) in the 1890 Birthday Honours.

He died in London on 27 June 1902.

== Family ==
Richey married, in 1872, Blanche Perkins, daughter of William Perkins, of Somerset, Louisiana. James Alexander Richey (1874–1931) was their son.
