= Muriel Pelham-Johnson =

British educational administrator (1903–1998)

Muriel Frances Ellen Pelham-Johnson (1903–1998), informally known as PJ, was an educational administrator in Tanganyika. As Assistant Director of Education (Girls and Women), she supervised the growth of girl's education between 1939 and 1958. "A formidable personality and an intrepid traveller, she was a memorably outstanding figure" of pre-independence.

She died on December 18, 1998.
